= Pedimental sculptures in the United States =

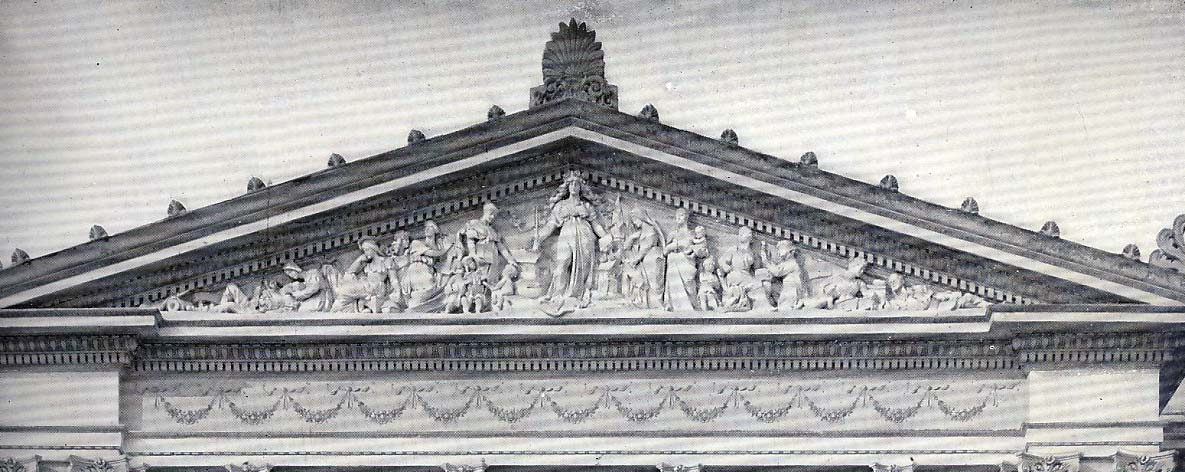
Women's Building Pediment (1893, destroyed), World's Columbian Exposition, Chicago, Illinois, by Alice Rideout

Pedimental sculptures are sculptures within the frame of a pediment on the exterior of a building, some examples of which can be found in the United States. Pedimental sculpture pose special challenges to sculptors: the triangular composition limits the choices for figures or ornament at the ends, and the sculpture must be designed to be viewed both from below and from a distance.

== History ==
=== Classical tradition ===
Historian Walter Copland Perry wrote that it was proof of the power of Greek art that the classical sculptors not only overcame the rigid restrictions of the pediment's shape, but turned them to their advantage. Compositionally, the restrictions imposed by both the physical triangular shape of a pediment, and the traditional themes that are usually employed for the subject matter, are, according to Professor Gardner of Oxford University, “as exactly regulated as that of a sonnet or a Spenserian stanza: the artist has liberty only in certain directions and must not violate the laws of rhythm.”

In all examples, classical and modern, the central area below the apex is inevitably the tallest, most spacious, the natural focus, and will contain the main figures and the focus of action. Secondary figures decrease in size and importance on both sides, as they approach the far angles at the base. The well-known classical examples all observe "unity of action", although the Greek historian Pausanias describes a sculpture by Praxiteles in which Hercules appears several times in different sizes.

As with the ancient Greeks, and the Roman architects and sculptors who followed them, American artists had two different structural approaches creating pedimental sculpture. They are either freestanding statues that stand on the bed (the ledge or cornice that creates the bottom of the pediment), or they can be relief sculpture, attached to the back wall of the pediment. As an additional physical restriction in the pediment format, a deeper recess will throw the triangular field into deeper shadow, which means the figures should be executed in deeper relief or fully in the round.

=== Application in the United States ===
Pedimental sculptures in the United States were rare prior to the 1880s, most surviving examples in cities along the east coast. The earliest seems to be Whitehall (1765), outside Annapolis, Maryland, attributed to English architect Joseph Horatio Anderson and English-born carver William Buckland, typical of early dependence on European talent.

Greek Revival architecture became dominant throughout the first half of the 19th century, but almost always with chaste, blank pediments. It was only post-Civil War, with the advent of the American Renaissance and the City Beautiful movement – especially the architectural vision of "The White City" presented at Chicago's World's Columbian Exposition of 1893 – that the use of sculpture in pediments increased dramatically.

The advent of the Great Depression largely brought the use of pediment sculpture to a halt, with the major exception of government buildings of the Federal Triangle in Washington, D.C. completed in the mid-1930s. One 21st-century example is the Schermerhorn Symphony Center in Nashville, Tennessee, with a pedimental sculpture Orpheus and Eurydice by sculptor Raymond Kaskey completed in 2006.

== Pedimental sculptures in Washington, D.C. (by building) ==
Building	Location	Image	Sculpture	Sculptor	Architect	Installed	Medium	Notes
William Jefferson Clinton Federal Building (formerly Ariel Rios Federal Building and Post Office Department Building)	12th Street & Pennsylvania Avenue; 38°53′38.04″N 77°1′44.04″W		12th Street: The Spirit of Progress and Civilization	Adolph Alexander Weinman; John Donnelly & Company (carver)	Delano & Aldrich	1935	limestone	Weinman's concave sculptured pediment may be unique in the United States.
William Jefferson Clinton Federal Building (formerly Ariel Rios Federal Building and Post Office Department Building)	12th Street & Pennsylvania Avenue; 38°53′38.04″N 77°1′44.04″W	(at upper right)	Pennsylvania Avenue: The Bond of Postal Union	Walker Hancock; Adolph Alexander Weinman	Delano & Aldrich	1935	limestone	Based on a sketch model by Weinman
William Jefferson Clinton Federal Building (formerly Ariel Rios Federal Building and Post Office Department Building)	12th Street & Pennsylvania Avenue; 38°53′38.04″N 77°1′44.04″W	(at upper right)	13th Street: Africa and Europe	George Holburn Snowden; Adolph Alexander Weinman; John Donnelly & Company (carver)	Delano & Aldrich	1934	limestone	
William Jefferson Clinton Federal Building (formerly Ariel Rios Federal Building and Post Office Department Building)	12th Street & Pennsylvania Avenue; 38°53′38.04″N 77°1′44.04″W		13th Street: America and Asia	Joseph E. Reiner; Adolph Alexander Weinman; John Donnelly & Company (carver)	Delano & Aldrich	1934	limestone	
Daughters of the American Revolution Constitution Hall	18th Street, between C & D Streets; 38°53′35″N 77°2′30″W		Eagle Pediment	Ulysses Ricci	John Russell Pope	1929	Alabama limestone	
Dirksen Senate Office Building	Constitution Avenue & 1st Street; 38°53′35″N 77°0′19″W		Eagle Pediment	Ulysses Ricci; Rochette & Parzini (carvers)	Eggers Group Architects	1956	marble	
Historical Society of Washington, D.C. (formerly the central District of Columbia Public Library)	Eighth & K Streets Northwest		two identical pediments, each with a head of Minerva surrounded by curled flora	Philip Martiny	Ross & Ackerman	1903	white Vermont marble	
Eisenhower Executive Office Building (formerly Old Executive Office Building and State, War, and Navy Building)	1700 Pennsylvania Avenue; 38°53′51.24″N 77°2′20.93″W		North pediment: War	designed by Richard von Ezdorf	Alfred B. Mullett	1884	painted iron	
Herbert C. Hoover Building; United States Department of Commerce	1401 Constitution Avenue NW; 38°53′39.48″N 77°1′58.08″W		Fisheries Pediment	Joseph Kiselewski; James Earle Fraser; John Donnelly & Company (carver)	Louis Ayres	1934	limestone	The building's 4 sculptured pediments are on the 15th Street facade, facing The Ellipse.
Herbert C. Hoover Building; United States Department of Commerce	1401 Constitution Avenue NW; 38°53′39.48″N 77°1′58.08″W		Mining Pediment	Frederick Roth; James Earle Fraser; John Donnelly & Company (carver)	Louis Ayres	1934	limestone	
Herbert C. Hoover Building; United States Department of Commerce	1401 Constitution Avenue NW; 38°53′39.48″N 77°1′58.08″W		Foreign and Domestic Commerce Pediment	Ulysses Ricci; James Earle Fraser; John Donnelly & Company (carver)	Louis Ayres	1934	limestone	
Herbert C. Hoover Building; United States Department of Commerce	1401 Constitution Avenue NW; 38°53′39.48″N 77°1′58.08″W		Aeronautics Pediment	Haig Patigian; James Earle Fraser; John Donnelly & Company (carver)	Louis Ayres	1934	limestone	
Jefferson Memorial	Tidal Basin; 38°52′53″N 77°2′13″W		Drafting the Declaration of Independence	Adolph Alexander Weinman	John Russell Pope	1943	marble	
Robert F. Kennedy Department of Justice Building	950 Pennsylvania Avenue NW |38°53′35.52″N 77°1′30″W		Eastern pediment: Ars Aequi (The Rights of Man)	C. Paul Jennewein; Henry Kreis; John Donnelly & Company (carver)	Milton Bennett Medary; Zantzinger, Borie & Medary	1935	limestone	The two sculptured pediments are on the Pennsylvania Avenue facade. The building's other pediments are blank.
Robert F. Kennedy Department of Justice Building	950 Pennsylvania Avenue NW |38°53′35.52″N 77°1′30″W		Western pediment: Ars Boni (The Good of the State)	C. Paul Jennewein; Henry Kreis; John Donnelly & Company (carver)	Milton Bennett Medary; Zantzinger, Borie & Medary	1935	limestone	
Library of Congress; Thomas Jefferson Building	Capitol Hill; 38.8887°N 77.0046°W		America Fostering the Arts and Industries and Atlantes	William Boyd	Edward Pearce Casey; Smithmeyer & Pelz	1897	granite	The two rounded pediments flank the central pavilion of the Jefferson Building's west front.
Andrew W. Mellon Auditorium / United States Department of Labor Building	1301 Constitution Avenue NW; 38°53′33.4″N 77°1′46.91″W		Columbia Pediment	Edgar Walter; Edward Ardolino (carver)	Arthur Brown, Jr.	1935	limestone	The Mellon Auditorium is middle-ground center; the U.S. Customs Building is left; the U.S. Interstate Commerce Commission is right:
National Academy of Sciences Building	2101 Constitution Avenue NW; 38°53′34.8″N 77°2′51.72″W		Constitution Avenue entrance	Lee Lawrie	Bertram Grosvenor Goodhue	1924		
National Archives Building	700 Pennsylvania Avenue; 38°53′34″N 77°01′23″W		North pediment: The Recorder of the Archives	James Earle Fraser; Edward H. Ratti (carver)	John Russell Pope	1935	Limestone	
National Archives Building	700 Pennsylvania Avenue; 38°53′34″N 77°01′23″W		South pediment: Destiny	Adolph Alexander Weinman; Edward Ardolino (carver)	John Russell Pope	1935	Indiana limestone Milford pink granite	
Notre Dame Chapel	Trinity Washington University, 125 Michigan Avenue, NE		Madonna and Child Enthroned Attended by Angels	D. H. McBride; McBride Studios	Maginnis & Walsh	1924	white Carrara marble	
Rayburn House Office Building	Independence Avenue, between South Capitol & 1st Streets		Eagle Pediment	Carl Paul Jennewein	Harbeson, Hough, Livingston & Larson	1964	Vermont marble	
Renwick Gallery	1661 Pennsylvania Avenue; 38°53′55.92″N 77°2′22.01″W		Relief portrait bust of William Wilson Corcoran	Moses Jacob Ezekiel	James Renwick Jr.	1878	bronze	Original home of the Corcoran Gallery of Art:
Riggs National Bank	1503-05 Pennsylvania Avenue; 38°53′55.52″N 77°2′2.84″W		Eagle pediment		York and Sawyer	1902		In a 1915 photograph:
United States Capitol	Capitol Hill; 38°53′23.29″N 77°00′32.81″W		Central portico, east front: The Genius of America	Luigi Persico	Thomas Ustick Walter	1828	sandstone (1828) marble (1960)	By 1959 the original sandstone sculpture group was badly deteriorated. Under the supervision of Paul Manship, sculptor Carl Schmitz repaired the statues, G. Giannetti made a plaster model from them, and Bruno Mankowski carved new statues. These were unveiled in 1960.
United States Capitol	Capitol Hill; 38°53′23.29″N 77°00′32.81″W		Senate wing, east front: The Progress of Civilization	Thomas Crawford; Carvers: T. Gagliardi, Vinchenzo Casoni, G. Butti, Louis Galli, G. Caprero, and Domenico Giampaoli	Thomas Ustick Walter	1863	marble	
United States Capitol	Capitol Hill; 38°53′23.29″N 77°00′32.81″W		House of Representatives wing, east front: Apotheosis of Democracy	Paul Wayland Bartlett; Piccirilli Brothers (carvers)	Thomas Ustick Walter	1916	marble	
United States Customs Building / United States Department of Labor	14th Street & Constitution Avenue NW; 38.892513°N 77.030930°W		Eastern pediment: Labor and Industry	Albert Stewart; John Donnelly & Company (carver)	Arthur Brown, Jr.	1935	limestone	
United States Customs Building / United States Department of Labor	14th Street & Constitution Avenue NW; 38.892513°N 77.030930°W		Western pediment: Abundance and Industry	Sherry Fry; John Donnelly & Company (carver)	Arthur Brown, Jr.	1936	limestone	
United States Department of Agriculture Building	Jefferson Drive between 12th & 14th Streets; 38°53′16.85″N 77°1′48.12″W		Fruit	Adolph Alexander Weinman	Rankin, Kellogg & Crane	1908	Vermont marble	The West and East Buildings (left & right) were completed in 1908. The Administration Building (center), connecting them, was completed in 1930.
United States Department of Agriculture Building	Jefferson Drive between 12th & 14th Streets; 38°53′16.85″N 77°1′48.12″W		Forestry	Adolph Alexander Weinman	Rankin, Kellogg & Crane	1908	Vermont marble	
United States Department of Agriculture Building	Jefferson Drive between 12th & 14th Streets; 38°53′16.85″N 77°1′48.12″W		Cereals	Adolph Alexander Weinman	Rankin, Kellogg & Crane	1908	Vermont marble	West Building:
United States Department of Agriculture Building	Jefferson Drive between 12th & 14th Streets; 38°53′16.85″N 77°1′48.12″W		Flowers	Adolph Alexander Weinman	Rankin, Kellogg & Crane	1908	Vermont marble	
United States Interstate Commerce Commission Building (now United States Environmental Protection Agency Building)	1201 Constitution Avenue; 38.893881°N 77.028891°W		Eastern pediment: Interstate Transportation	Edward McCartan; John Donnelly & Company (carver)	Arthur Brown, Jr.	1935	Indiana limestone	
United States Interstate Commerce Commission Building (now United States Environmental Protection Agency Building)	1201 Constitution Avenue; 38.893881°N 77.028891°W		Western pediment: Commerce and Communications	Wheeler Williams; John Donnelly & Company (carver)	Arthur Brown, Jr.	1935	Indiana limestone	
United States Supreme Court Building	Capitol Hill; 38°53′25.8″N 77°0′16.2″W		West pediment: Equal Justice Under Law (Liberty Enthroned)	Robert Ingersoll Aitken	Cass Gilbert	1935	Vermont marble	
United States Supreme Court Building	Capitol Hill; 38°53′25.8″N 77°0′16.2″W		East pediment: Justice, the Guardian of Liberty	Hermon Atkins MacNeil	Cass Gilbert	1935	Vermont marble	

== Alabama ==
Building	Location	Image	Sculpture	Sculptor	Architect	Installed	Medium	Notes
Calhoun County Courthouse	25 West 11th Street, Anniston		Eagle pediment		J. W. Golucke	1900 burned 1931		a flying eagle flanked by fasces and cornucopias

== Arizona ==
Building	Location	Image	Sculpture	Sculptor	Architect	Installed	Medium	Notes
Santa Cruz County Courthouse	Morley Avenue & Court Street, Nogales				Trost & Rust	1904		Now a museum.

== California ==
Building	Location	Image	Sculpture	Sculptor	Architect	Installed	Medium	Notes
Inyo County Courthouse	Independence; 36°48′13″N 118°11′56″W				William H. Weeks	1921-22		"Reposed women" hold a shield that is presumed to represent Justice.
California State Capitol	Sacramento		West portico: California	Pietro Mezzara	M. Frank Butler; Reuben Clark; Gordon Cummings	1873	cast stone	
California State Library	10th Street & Capitol Mall, Sacramento		Into the Highlands of the Mind Let Me Go	Edward Field Sanford, Jr.	Weeks and Day	1928	painted terra cotta	
California State Office Building (now Jesse M. Unruh State Office Building)	915 Capitol Mall, Sacramento		Bring Me Men to Match My Mountains	Edward Field Sanford, Jr.	Weeks and Day	1928	painted terra cotta	
Sacramento City Hall	915 I Street, Sacramento		Rounded pediments on end pavilions		Rudolph A. Herold	1909	terra cotta	
California State Chamber of Commerce Building; San Francisco Mining Exchange	350 Bush Street, San Francisco		Greek Pediment	Jo Mora	Miller & Pflueger	1921	terra cotta	
Metropolitan Life Insurance Company Building (now Ritz Carlton San Francisco)	Nob Hill, 600 Stockton Street, San Francisco		An Allegorical Group	Haig Patigian; Jo Mora	Miller & Pflueger	1920	glazed terra cotta	Napoleon LeBrun & Sons designed the original building, 1909. The pediment was added as part of Miller & Pflueger's 1919-20 expansion.
San Francisco City Hall	400 Van Ness Avenue, San Francisco		Van Ness Avenue pediment	Henri Crenier	Bakewell & Brown	1914	granite	
San Francisco City Hall	400 Van Ness Avenue, San Francisco		Polk Street pediment	Henri Crenier	Bakewell & Brown	1914	granite	
San Francisco Savings Union Bank (now Emporio Armani)	1 Grant Avenue, San Francisco		Liberty	Haig Patigian	Bliss & Faville	1911	granite	Patigian's bas relief head of Liberty was based on the 1907 $20 gold coin.
Hearst Castle; San Simeon	San Simeon		Neptune Pool Roman Temple: Neptune and Neraids	pediment is a collection of unrelated Roman & Greek works.	Julia Morgan	1936	white marble	The Roman Temple was assembled from ancient architectural fragments and modern reproductions.

== Colorado ==
Building	Location	Image	Sculpture	Sculptor	Architect	Installed	Medium	Notes
Colorado State Capitol	200 East Colfax Avenue, Denver		West pediment:		Elijah E. Myers	1894		
Pueblo County Courthouse	10th & Main Streets, Pueblo		Eagle and wreath		Albert Randolph Ross	1912	white sandstone	

== Connecticut ==
Building	Location	Image	Sculpture	Sculptor	Architect	Installed	Medium	Notes
New Haven County Courthouse	121 Elm Street, New Haven		The pediment figures are Justice, Victory, Precedence, Accuracy, Common Law, Statutory Law, Progress and Commerce.	John Massey Rhind	Allen & Williams	1917	marble	
Basilica of the Immaculate Conception	74 West Main Street, Waterbury		Virgin Mary flanked by angels		Maginnis & Walsh	1928		

== Georgia ==
Building	Location	Image	Sculpture	Sculptor	Architect	Installed	Medium	Notes
Georgia State Capitol	Capitol Square, Atlanta		West pediment: Seal of Georgia, flanked by Commerce, Industry, Justice, and Prosperity	George Crouch	Edbrooke & Burnham	1889	Oolitic limestone	The building's other pediments are blank.
Chatham Academy	Bull Street & East Oglethorpe Avenue, Savannah		pediment on western facade: a scene of several young women studying, with a background of the Coliseum and the Parthenon	unknown	Henry Urban	1908	stone	

== Idaho ==
Building	Location	Image	Sculpture	Sculptor	Architect	Installed	Medium	Notes
Boise High School	1010 West Washington Street, Boise		Boise High School Portico	Joseph Conradi	Tourtellotte & Hummel	1922		A relief head of Plato is at center.

== Illinois ==
Building	Location	Image	Sculpture	Sculptor	Architect	Installed	Medium	Notes
Civic Opera Building	20 North Wacker Drive, Chicago	North entrance	Pediments over north and south entrances	Henry Hering	Graham, Anderson, Probst & White	1929		South entrance Home of the Lyric Opera of Chicago
Kankakee County Courthouse	450 East Court Street, Kankakee; 41°7′9″N 87°51′37″W				Zachary Taylor Davis	1912		Similar pediments above "KANKAKEE COUNTY COURTHOUSE" on north and south sides of courthouse include an escutcheon (coat of arms) representing the county.

== Indiana ==
Building	Location	Image	Sculpture	Sculptor	Architect	Installed	Medium	Notes
Allen County Courthouse	715 South Calhoun Street, Fort Wayne; 41°4′47″N 85°8′21″W	Spirit of the Law	Calhoun Street pediment: Spirit of Civilization; Main Street pediment: Spirit of Government; Berry Street pediment: Spirit of the Law; Court Street pediment: Spirit of the Arts	Barth & Staak?	Brentwood S. Tolan	1902	Bedford limestone	
Circle Theater	45 Monument Circle, Indianapolis			Alexander Sangernebo	Rubush & Hunter	1916	terra cotta	
Indiana State House	200 West Washington Street, Indianapolis		East pediment:		Edwin May; Adolph Scherrer	1888		
Tippecanoe County Courthouse	Public Square, Lafayette		North and south pediments: William Henry Harrison - Marquis de Lafayette - Tecumseh	J. L. Mott Iron Works	Elias Max and/or James F. Alexander	1884	painted zinc	Identical sculpture groups on the north and south pediments, and on the east and west pediments.
Tippecanoe County Courthouse	Public Square, Lafayette		East and west pediments: Justice - Industry - Agriculture	J. L. Mott Iron Works	Elias Max and/or James F. Alexander	1884	painted zinc	Identical sculpture groups on the north and south pediments, and on the east and west pediments.
Boone County Courthouse	Courthouse Square, Lebanon		North & south pediments		Joseph T. Hutton	1911	limestone	The building has identical sculptured pediments on the north and south facades.
Muncie Public Library	301 East Jackson Street, Muncie				Marshall S. Mahurin	1903	Indiana limestone	
Vigo County Courthouse	33 So. 3rd St., Terre Haute, Indiana; 39°27′57″N 87°24′52″W				Samuel Hannaford	1888		

== Iowa ==
Building	Location	Image	Sculpture	Sculptor	Architect	Installed	Medium	Notes
Iowa State Capitol	Des Moines	East facade	East and west pediments are identical, with five robed, female, allegorical figures, the central one holding a torch		John C. Cochrane; Alfred H. Piquenard	1886	sandstone	West facade:
Dubuque County Courthouse	720 Central Avenue, Dubuque		West facade: Eagle pediment		Fridolin Heer & Son	1891		Painted zinc sculptures adorn the roof:
Macbride Hall	University of Iowa, 17 North Clinton Street, Iowa City		A buffalo stands flanked by two elk	Sinclair Shearer	Proudfoot & Bird	1908		
Greene County Courthouse	114 North Chestnut Street, Jefferson		male and female figures flank a clock		Proudfoot, Bird & Rawson	1918		
First Newton National Bank	100 N 2nd Avenue West, Newton		a central figure of agricultural plenty is surrounded by four other figures and farm scenes in low relief		E. Jackson Case Company of Chicago	1920		

== Kentucky ==
Building	Location	Image	Sculpture	Sculptor	Architect	Installed	Medium	Notes
Kenton County Library	1028 Scott Street, Covington		pediment with four figures surrounding an angel	J.C. Meyerberg	Boll & Taylor	1904	sandstone	Built as a Carnegie library and auditorium The building is now The Carnegie, a community arts center.
Mother of God Roman Catholic Church	119 West Sixth Street, Covington		The Annunciation	unknown	architect James Keys Wilson of Walter & Stuart	1871	unknown	
Kentucky State Capitol	Frankfort		North pediment	Charles Henry Niehaus; Peter A. Rossack (carver)	Frank Mills Andrews	1906	Oolitic limestone	The building's east, west and south pediments are blank.
Louisville City Hall	601 West Jefferson Street, Louisville		Progress	unknown	John Andrew Artha	1873	Indiana limestone	The pedimental sculpture depicts a steam locomotive moving toward southern flora.

== Louisiana ==
Building	Location	Image	Sculpture	Sculptor	Architect	Installed	Medium	Notes
Calcasieu Parish District Courthouse	Lakeshore Drive and Kirby Street, Lake Charles		central pelican		Favrot & Livaudais	1912		The sculpture is a version of the Seal of Louisiana, depicting the "pelican in her piety" under a scroll reading "Union, Justice and Confidence"
The Cabildo	701 Chartres Street, New Orleans			Pietro Cardelli	Gilberto Guillemard	1822		The 1795-99 building's pediment originally featured the Royal Arms of Spain, by sculptor Cristobal Le Prévost. This was replaced in 1822 by an American eagle flanked by cannons, by Cardelli.
Gallier Hall (New Orleans City Hall)	545 St. Charles Avenue, New Orleans		figures of Liberty, Justice, and Commerce	R.E. Launitz	James Gallier	1851	white marble	
Paul M. Hebert Law Center	1 E Campus Dr, Baton Rouge		three figures		Leon C. Weiss of Weiss, Dreyfous & Seiferth	1937		originally Leche Hall, named for Governor Richard W. Leche

== Maryland ==
Building	Location	Image	Sculpture	Sculptor	Architect	Installed	Medium	Notes
Maryland State House Annex	Maryland; State Circle, Annapolis		Seal of Maryland		Baldwin & Pennington	1905		The west portico and pediment were part of a 1902-05 expansion of the 1722 building.
Whitehall	Maryland; 1915 Whitehall Road, Annapolis		Seal of Province of Maryland	William Buckland	Joseph Horatio Anderson	1765	painted wood	
Baltimore City Recreational Pier	Maryland; Fells Point, 1715 Thames Street, Baltimore		Recreation Pier Relief		Theodore Wells Pietsch	1914	limestone	
First Unitarian Church	Maryland; Charles & Franklin Streets, Baltimore		Pediment with the Angel of Truth emerging from a sunburst	Antonio Cappellano; Henry Berge (1960 copy)	Maximilian Godefroy	1818; 1960	polychrome terra cotta	The pedimental sculpture was replaced by a copy, 1960.
Baltimore Museum of Art	Maryland; Art Museum Drive, Baltimore; 39°19′34″N 76°37′9″W		To the Fine Arts	Adolph Alexander Weinman	John Russell Pope	1930	limestone	
St. Mary's Seminary and University	Maryland; Belvedere and Roland Avenues, Baltimore			unknown	Maginnis & Walsh	1929		
Colonial Theatre	Maryland; 12-14 South Potomac Street, Hagerstown		two figures, with lute and lyre, face each other, with two angelic putti	Henri Plasschaert of the Boston Terra Cotta Company	Harry E. Yessler	1914	polychrome terra cotta	

== Massachusetts ==
Building	Location	Image	Sculpture	Sculptor	Architect	Installed	Medium	Notes
Dunster House	Massachusetts; Harvard University, 945 Memorial Drive, Cambridge		Central pediment: Harvard College Coat of Arms		Hugh Shepley of Coolidge, Shepley, Bulfinch & Abbott	1930		Named for Henry Dunster, Harvard's first president. One end pavilion pediment features the coat of arms of the Dunster family, and the other the coat of arms of Dunster's alma mater, Magdalene College, Cambridge.
Mary Immaculate of Lourdes Church	Massachusetts; 270 Elliot Street, Newton		The Virgin Mary flanked by attendants		Edward T. P. Graham	1910		
New Bedford City Hall	Massachusetts; William Street, New Bedford		New Bedford Industries and City Seal	Timothy J. McAuliffe	Samuel C. Hunt	1908	brownstone	
New Bedford Institution for Savings	Massachusetts; 174 Union Street, New Bedford		Worker and mother flank an angel, who is both winged and modestly dressed	Hugh Cairns	Charles Brigham	1897		
Saint Joseph Memorial Chapel	Massachusetts; College of the Holy Cross, 1 College Street, Worcester				Maginnis & Walsh	1924		Memorial to Holy Cross students and alumni killed in World War I.

== Michigan ==
Building	Location	Image	Sculpture	Sculptor	Architect	Installed	Medium	Notes
Wayne County Courthouse	Michigan; 600 Randolph Street, Detroit		General Anthony Wayne and Indians Conducting a Treaty	Edward Wagner	John Scott	1901	stone	
Michigan State Capitol	Michigan; Lansing		The Rise and Progress of Michigan	Carl H. Wehner; Lewis T. Ives; Richard Rutter (carver); Richard Glaister (carver)	Elijah E. Myers	1876	sandstone	

== Minnesota ==
Building	Location	Image	Sculpture	Sculptor	Architect	Installed	Medium	Notes
Basilica of Saint Mary	Minnesota; 1600 Hennepin Avenue, Minneapolis		Virgin Mary with attendants and putti		Emmanuel Louis Masqueray	1914		

== Mississippi ==
Building	Location	Image	Sculpture	Sculptor	Architect	Installed	Medium	Notes
Mississippi State Capitol	Mississippi; Mississippi Street, Jackson; 32°18′14″N 90°10′56″W			Robert Bringhurst	Theodore C. Link	1900		"Sculpted in 1900, with an enthroned personification of the state at the center, surrounded by figures representing Poetry, Industry, and Science, huntsmen, farmers, white people, black people, and Native American, they are Mississippi's version of the pediment of the Parthenon in Athens, Greece."
Illinois State Memorial	Mississippi; Vicksburg National Military Park, Vicksburg		Pediment	Charles J. Mulligan	William Le Baron Jenny	1906	Georgia white marble	

== Missouri ==
Building	Location	Image	Sculpture	Sculptor	Architect	Installed	Medium	Notes
Missouri State Capitol	Missouri; 201 West Capitol Avenue, Jefferson City		Missouri State Capitol Pediment	Adolph Alexander Weinman	Tracy & Swartout	1926	Burlington limestone	
New Masonic Temple	Missouri; 3681 Lindell Boulevard, St. Louis		two pediments, front and rear, decorate the attic temple of a neo-Classical concrete Masonic lodge	Victor Berlendis	Eames & Young with Albert B. Groves	1926		front: two lamassu standing in profile face a radiant central structure (perhaps a Masonic altar). rear: low-relief garlands and floral carving

== Nebraska ==
Building	Location	Image	Sculpture	Sculptor	Architect	Installed	Medium	Notes
Omaha Central High School	Nebraska; 124 N 20th Street, Omaha		Omaha Central High School pediment	Jacob Maag	John Latenser Sr.	1912		
Pawnee County Courthouse	Nebraska; 625 6th St., Pawnee City; 40°6′29″N 96°9′12″W				William F. Gernandt	1911	terra cotta	Classical Revival county courthouse with sculpture of two men and two women appearing to "symbolize agriculture and the fertility of the county."
Washington County Courthouse	Nebraska 16th St. between Colfax and South Sts., Blair; 41°32′24″N 96°08′06″W				O.H. Placey	1889	painted metal	Two pediments, north and west, contain symbols of the county, appearing to be set loosely in place. Items symbolize "farming in the county, the immigrant experience, and county government."

== New Hampshire ==
Building	Location	Image	Sculpture	Sculptor	Architect	Installed	Medium	Notes
Latchis Theatre	New Hampshire; 55 Pleasant Street, Claremont		Pediment		Mason & Haynes	1928	concrete	
New Hampshire State House	New Hampshire; 107 North Main Street, Concord		Seal of New Hampshire		Stuart Park	1819	granite	New Hampshire State House c. 1875:
Dover City Hall	New Hampshire; 228 Central Avenue, Dover		Dover City Seal		Edward J. Richardson	1935	concrete	
Saint Joseph Church	New Hampshire; 150 Central Avenue, Dover		St. Joseph with Infant Child	Lualdi & Sons	James J. O'Shaughnessy	1948	Indiana limestone	

== New Jersey ==
Building	Location	Image	Sculpture	Sculptor	Architect	Installed	Medium	Notes
Jersey City City Hall	New Jersey; 280 Grove Street, Jersey City		two pediment sculptures		Lewis Broome	1896	metal	three of five original pediments destroyed in 1955 fire
William L. Dickinson High School	New Jersey; 2 Palisade Avenue, Jersey City				John T. Rowland	1906		
American Insurance Company Building	New Jersey; 15 Washington Street, Newark		central eagle in deep relief, trailing garlands		John H. & Wilson C. Ely	1930	limestone	Formerly housed S. I. Newhouse Center for Law and Justice (Rutgers School of Law – Newark)
New Brunswick Free Public Library	New Jersey; 60 Livingston Avenue, New Brunswick		six full-length male and female figures in high relief	Jacobson & Co., contractors	George K. Parsell	1903		part of the Livingston Avenue Historic District
Old Passaic County Courthouse	New Jersey; 71 Hamilton Street, Paterson, New Jersey		multiple robed figures, the middle two of whom flank a seal or escutcheon, in deep relief		Samuel Burrage Reed	1903	marble	

== New York ==
Building	Location	Image	Sculpture	Sculptor	Architect	Installed	Medium	Notes
Buffalo History Museum (built as the New York State Pavilion for the 1901 Pan-American Exposition)	New York; Delaware Park, Buffalo		Pediment	Edmond Amateis	George Cary	1930	Vermont white marble	The building's pediment was blank for the 1901 Pan-American Exposition. Amateis created the pedimental sculptures and 9 relief panels, 1929-30.
Greene County Courthouse	New York; Catskill			A. P. Lombard Company	William J. Beardsley	1909	Ohio sandstone	
Hall of Christ	New York; Chautauqua Institution, Wythe & South Streets, Chautauqua		Aula Christie pediment		Paul J. Pelz	1908	concrete	The sculptured pediment features an open Bible emitting rays of knowledge.
Elmira City Hall	New York; Lake & West Church Streets, Elmira	Arts & Sciences	South pediment: The Arts and Sciences; East pediment: Liberty?	New York Architectural Terra-Cotta Company	Pierce & Bickford	1895	terra cotta	
Bronx Zoo	New York; Bronx Park, 2300 Southern Boulevard, Bronx, New York City		Primate House: Orangutan Pediment	A. Phimister Proctor	Heins & LaFarge	1901	stone	Proctor also modeled the baboon figure atop the pediment and the monkey frieze along the building's cornice.
Bronx Zoo	New York; Bronx Park, 2300 Southern Boulevard, Bronx, New York City		Lion House: Lion Pediment	Eli Harvey	Heins & LaFarge	1903	stone	Harvey also modeled the seated lion sentinels and the lion heads in the building's cornice.
Brooklyn Museum	New York; 200 Eastern Parkway, Brooklyn, New York City		Science and Art	Daniel Chester French; Adolph Alexander Weinman; Piccirilli Brothers (carvers)	McKim, Mead & White	1913	Indiana limestone	
Dime Savings Bank of Brooklyn	New York; 9 DeKalb Avenue, Brooklyn, New York City		Morning and Evening of Life	Lee Lawrie	Robert Helmer; Halsey, McCormack & Helmer	1932	stone	The original 1908 building, by architects Mowbray & Uffinger, had no pediment. The portico and pediment were added by Helmer, 1931-32.
People's Trust Company	New York; 183 Montague Street, Brooklyn, New York City		a male and female figure recline on either side of an emblem		Mowbray and Uffinger	1903	marble	
Appellate Division Courthouse of New York State	New York; 35 East 25th Street, Manhattan, New York City		The Triumph of Law	Charles Henry Niehaus	James Brown Lord	1900	white marble	Daniel Chester French's acroterion sculpture Justice, atop the pediment.
Baudouine Building	New York; 1181-1183 Broadway, Manhattan, New York City		one fully carved pediment on an attic Greek temple, facing east; another two pediments on top floor contain floral designs		Alfred Zucker	1896		difficult to see from street level
Bowery Savings Bank	New York; 130 Bowery, Manhattan, New York City	130 Bowery pediment	2 identical sculpture groups	Frederick MacMonnies; Piccirilli Brothers (carvers)	Stanford White; McKim, Mead & White	1895	limestone	The L-shaped building has sculptured pediments on the Bowery and Grand Street facades. 228 Grand Street pediment:
Federal Hall (demolished)	New York; Wall Street, Manhattan, New York City		Eagle Pediment	unknown	Pierre Charles L'Enfant	1788	wood?	George Washington's first presidential inauguration took place on the balcony in 1789. Demolished 1812
Henry Clay Frick House; Frick Collection	New York; 1 East 70th Street, Manhattan, New York City		Garden pavilion, south pediment:	Philip Martiny; Ardolino Brothers (carvers)	Thomas Hastings	1914	Bedford blue limestone	Two of the rounded pediments adorn the garden pavilion, at left.
Henry Clay Frick House; Frick Collection	New York; 1 East 70th Street, Manhattan, New York City		Garden pavilion, north pediment: Music	Attilio Piccirilli; Ardolino Brothers (carvers)	Thomas Hastings	1914	Bedford blue limestone	
Henry Clay Frick House; Frick Collection	New York; 1 East 70th Street, Manhattan, New York City		70th Street pediment:	Sherry Fry	Thomas Hastings	1914		Originally over the porte cochere. Now over the public entrance. Modeled by Audrey Munson.
Henry Clay Frick House; Frick Collection	New York; 1 East 70th Street, Manhattan, New York City		71st Street pediment:	Charles Keck	Thomas Hastings	1914		Originally over the porte cochere. Now beside the Frick Art Reference Library entrance.
Hudson River Railway Company Freight Terminal (demolished) (New York Central Railroad)	New York; Hudson Street at St. John's Park, Manhattan, New York City		Cornelius Vanderbilt pediment	Ernst Plassmann	George Fischer & Brother, founder	1868	Statue: bronze Relief: bronze	The statue was relocated in 1929 to Grand Central Terminal: The freight terminal site is now an approach to the Holland Tunnel.
Madison Square Presbyterian Church (demolished)	New York; Madison Square, 24th Street & Madison Avenue, Manhattan, New York City		The Adoration of the Shrine of Truth – pedimental relief sculpture of the Ark of the Covenant, flanked by angels, cherubs, a knight and a shepherd – figures in white & gold set against a blue background	Adolph Alexander Weinman	Stanford White; McKim, Mead & White; Atlantic Terra Cotta Company	1910	terra cotta	MMA Library exterior, 1920. The 44-foot-long pediment was removed prior to the church's demolition in 1919, and installed on the exterior of the Metropolitan Museum of Art Library. It was destroyed during a museum expansion in 1960.
Museum of the City of New York	New York; 1220-27 Fifth Avenue, Manhattan, New York City		Seal of New York City	Leo Friedlander	Joseph H. Freedlander	1930	white marble	
New York City Police Headquarters	New York; 240 Center Street, Manhattan, New York City		four pediments, with the main (western) facade featuring two figures on either side of a crest, trailing garlands, another version of the NYC municipal seal		Hoppin & Koen	1909		
New York County Courthouse (now New York State Supreme Court Building)	New York; 60 Centre Street, Manhattan, New York City		The True Administration of Justice is the Finest Pillar of Good Government	Frederick Warren Allen	Guy Lowell	1927	granite	
New York County National Bank Building	New York; Eight Avenue and West 14th Street, Manhattan, New York City		a lone eagle, wings spread, centered in the pediment	unknown	Rudolphe L. Daus; De Lemos & Cordes	1907	stone	
New York Public Library Main Branch	New York; Fifth Avenue & 42nd Street, Manhattan, New York City		Northern pediment: The Arts	George Grey Barnard; John Donnelly (carver); Ulysses Ricci carver	Carrère and Hastings	1917	marble	The sculptured pediments are atop the end pavilions of the Fifth Avenue façade.
New York Public Library Main Branch	New York; Fifth Avenue & 42nd Street, Manhattan, New York City		Southern pediment: History	George Grey Barnard; John Donnelly (carver); Ulysses Ricci carver	Carrère and Hastings	1917	marble	
New York Stock Exchange	New York; 11 Wall Street, Manhattan, New York City		Integrity Protecting the Works of Man	John Quincy Adams Ward with Paul Wayland Bartlett; Gentulio Piccirilli (carver)	George Browne Post	1904	white marble (1904) painted copper (1936)	Ward's marble figures were replaced with painted copper replicas in 1936.
St. Andrew's Roman Catholic Church	New York; 20 Cardinal Hayes Place, Manhattan, New York City		two male winged angels flank a cartouche		Maginnis & Walsh with Robert J. Reiley	1939		
St. Paul's Chapel	New York; 209 Broadway, Manhattan, New York City		Statue of St. Paul	unknown	Thomas McBean	1790	wood (tulip poplar)	In a 1799 painting by Archibald Robertson: The statue was replaced by a resin replica in 2016. The original has been restored, and is now housed inside the chapel.
Kykuit; John D. Rockefeller Estate	New York; 200 Lake Road, Pocantico Hills			Francois Tonetti, possibly assisted by his spouse Mary Lawrence Tonetti	Delano & Aldrich	1913		
Rush Rhees Library	New York; University of Rochester, Rochester			Ulysses Ricci; Edward Ardolino (carver)	Charles A. Platt; Gordon & Kaelber	1930		
Hall of Springs	New York; Saratoga Spa State Park, Saratoga Springs		3 pediments: Man and Nature Join Together in the Waters of the Springs; Athena Introduces Asklepios to the Saratoga Springs; The Infidelity of Asklepios	George H. Snowden	Joseph H. Freedlander	1934	stone	

== Ohio ==
Building	Location	Image	Sculpture	Sculptor	Architect	Installed	Medium	Notes
Stark County Courthouse	Ohio; Tuscarawas Street, Canton		Commerce - Justice - Agriculture - Industry	unknown	George F. Hammond	1895		The 1870 Second Empire style courthouse was dramatically altered to a Beaux Arts style by Hammond, 1893-95.
Cleveland Trust Company Building	Ohio; 9th Street & Euclid Avenue, Cleveland		The Blessings of Land and Water	Karl Bitter	George Browne Post & Sons	1907	granite	
Severance Hall	Ohio; 11001 Euclid Avenue, Cleveland		Severance Hall Pediment	Henry Hering	Frank Ginn; Walker and Weeks	1931	Indiana limestone	
Stambaugh Auditorium	Ohio; 1000 Fifth Avenue, Youngstown		Pediment Group	Gaetano Cecere	Harvey Wiley Corbett	1926	Indiana limestone	

== Oklahoma ==
Building	Location	Image	Sculpture	Sculptor	Architect	Installed	Medium	Notes
Carnegie Library (Guthrie, Oklahoma)	Oklahoma; 402 East Oklahoma Avenue, Guthrie	South pediment	2 identical pediments on south and west facades		J. H. Bennett	1903	terra cotta?	

== Oregon ==
Building	Location	Image	Sculpture	Sculptor	Architect	Installed	Medium	Notes
First National Bank Building	Oregon; 401 SW 5th Avenue, Portland		Seal of Oregon Territory flanked by allegorical figures		Coolidge & Shattuck	1916		

== Pennsylvania ==
Building	Location	Image	Sculpture	Sculptor	Architect	Installed	Medium	Notes
Kirby Hall, Lafayette College	Pennsylvania; 730 High Street, Easton		two female figures with props (fasces, scales, crown, owl, a pile of books) flank a rectangular panel reading "Hall of Civil Rights", with eagle perched above	Edward McCartan	Warren and Wetmore	1930		
Lynnewood Hall	Pennsylvania; 920 Spring Avenue, Elkins Park		Pedimental sculpture	Henri-Léon Gréber	Horace Trumbauer	1914	Caen stone	Trumbauer altered the 1897 mansion's original pediment to accommodate Gréber's sculpture group.
Westmoreland County Courthouse	Pennsylvania; 2 North Main Street, Greensburg				William S. Kaufman	1906		
Matthew Ryan Legislative Office Building	Pennsylvania; Third Street and Pine; Pennsylvania State Capitol Complex, Harrisburg		version of Coat of Arms of Pennsylvania		John T. Windrim	1893		built as Executive Library and Museum Building
Broad Street Station (demolished)	Pennsylvania; Broad & Market Streets, Philadelphia		Fire and Water Tamed and Harnessed to the Service of Man	Karl Bitter	Frank Furness	1894	red terra cotta	Installed above the entrance to the 15th Street tunnel. Demolished 1953
First Bank of the United States	Pennsylvania; 120 South 3rd Street, Philadelphia		Eagle Pediment	Clodius F. Legrand & Sons	Samuel Blodgett (attributed), possibly with James Hoban	1797	painted mahogany	
Free Library of Philadelphia; Parkway Central Library	Pennsylvania; 1901 Vine Street, Philadelphia	Printing	Eastern pediment: History of Printing	John Donnelly & Company	Horace Trumbauer	1927	limestone	Vine Street façade: Putti with books and screw printing press:
Free Library of Philadelphia; Parkway Central Library	Pennsylvania; 1901 Vine Street, Philadelphia		Western pediment: Writing	John Donnelly & Company	Horace Trumbauer	1927	limestone	Putti with paper and typewriter:
Germantown High School	Pennsylvania; 40 High Street, Philadelphia		a central winged female figure is flanked by 11 other figures, with children holding scrolls, skulls, a locomotive, other allegorical props	Louis Milione		1914		
Girard Trust Corn Exchange Bank (now Ritz-Carlton Philadelphia)	Pennsylvania; 34-35 South Broad Street, Philadelphia		Relief portrait bust of Stephen Girard flanked by sailing ships		Frank Furness (preliminary design); Allen Evans (plan); McKim, Mead & White (detailing)	1908	white marble	Ritz-Carlton Philadelphia:
Philadelphia County Family Court Building	Pennsylvania; 1801 Vine Street, Philadelphia		Eastern pediment: Family Unity	Giuseppe Donato	John T. Windrim; Morton Keast	1940	limestone	The building is a near twin to the Parkway Central Library (left).
Philadelphia County Family Court Building	Pennsylvania; 1801 Vine Street, Philadelphia		Western pediment: Family Protection	Louis Milione	John T. Windrim; Morton Keast	1940	limestone	
Philadelphia Museum of Art	Pennsylvania; Benjamin Franklin Parkway, Philadelphia		Western Civilization	C. Paul Jennewein	Horace Trumbauer; Zantzinger & Borie	1932	polychrome terra cotta	The museum's exterior features 8 pediments. Only this sculpture group has been completed. The one-third-size plaster models for sculptor John Gregory's never-completed Pursuit of Wisdom Pediment (1926) are in PMA's collection.
Rodin Museum	Pennsylvania; Benjamin Franklin Parkway & 21st Street, Philadelphia		replica of the Meudon Monument (Rodin's grave)	Benedict Stone Corp.	Paul Philippe Cret	1929	limestone sculpture: cast stone	Meudon Monument The Meudon Monument features the ruins of an 18th-century façade from the Château d'Issy (burned 1871). Rodin's grave is marked by a copy of his most famous sculpture, The Thinker.
University of Pennsylvania Law School (now Silverman Hall)	Pennsylvania; 34th & Chestnut Streets, Philadelphia		pediment with two unicorns flanking cartouche, eagle above	Edward Maene	Cope and Stewardson	1902	limestone	The building was modeled after Christopher Wren's 1689–1702 addition to Hampton Court Palace, which shows a similar heraldic image but with no pediment.

== South Carolina ==
Building	Location	Image	Sculpture	Sculptor	Architect	Installed	Medium	Notes
Charleston City Hall (formerly Charleston Branch, Bank of the United States)	South Carolina; 80 Broad Street, Charleston		Charleston City Seal	James E. Walker & Brothers	Gabriel Manigault (attributed), 1804 Charles Reichardt, 1839	1839	stone	Manigault designed the building as the Charleston Branch, Bank of the United States, 1804. Reichardt altered it into the City Hall, 1839. The seal's Latin motto translates, '"The Body Politic, She Guards Her Buildings, Customs and Laws." The building is the "second-oldest city hall in continuous use in America."
South Carolina National Bank of Charleston	South Carolina; 16 Broad Street, Charleston		carved, gilded eagle	unknown	unknown	1817	gilded oak	

== Tennessee ==
Building	Location	Image	Sculpture	Sculptor	Architect	Installed	Medium	Notes
Shelby County Courthouse	Tennessee; 160 Adams Street, Memphis		Four pediment groups: Canon Law, Roman Law, Statutory Law, Civil Law and Criminal Law.	J. Massey Rhind	H. D. Hale and James Gamble Rogers	Building constructed in 1909		
Parthenon	Tennessee; Centennial Park, Nashville		East pediment: The Birth of Athena	George Julian Zolnay (1897); Belle Kinney (1931); Leopold Scholz (1931)	Capt. W.C. Smith, (1897); Russell E. Hart, (1931)	1931	painted concrete	Nashville's nickname is "The Athens of the South," and a replica of the Parthenon was built to be the main attraction at the 1897 Tennessee Centennial Exposition. Constructed of artificial stone over wood, it was expected to be temporary building. A permanent replica, constructed of concrete over a steel armature, was begun in the 1920s and completed in 1931.
Parthenon	Tennessee; Centennial Park, Nashville		West pediment: The Battle between Athena and Poseidon	George Julian Zolnay (1897); Belle Kinney (1931); Leopold Scholz (1931)	Capt. W.C. Smith, (1897); Russell E. Hart, (1931)	1931	painted concrete	Nashville's nickname is "The Athens of the South," and a replica of the Parthenon was built to be the main attraction at the 1897 Tennessee Centennial Exposition. Constructed of artificial stone over wood, it was expected to be temporary building. A permanent replica, constructed of concrete over a steel armature, was begun in the 1920s and completed in 1931.
Schermerhorn Symphony Center	Tennessee; 1 Symphony Place, Nashville			Raymond Kaskey	David M. Schwarz; Earl Swensson Associates	2006	marble	Home of the Nashville Symphony

== Utah ==
Building	Location	Image	Sculpture	Sculptor	Architect	Installed	Medium	Notes
Noyes Building	Utah; Snow College, 150 East College Avenue, Ephraim		The Three Muses	Richard C. Watkins		1903	painted tin over carved wood or plaster	

== Virginia ==
Building	Location	Image	Sculpture	Sculptor	Architect	Installed	Medium	Notes
George Washington Masonic National Memorial	Virginia; 101 Callahan Drive, Alexandria		George Washington Medallion	Gail Sherman Corbett	Harvey Wiley Corbett	1932	granite	
Cabell Hall	Virginia; University of Virginia, Charlottesville		Ye Shall Know the Truth, and the Truth Shall Make You Free	George Julian Zolnay	Stanford White; McKim, Mead & White	1898	painted concrete	

== West Virginia ==
Building	Location	Image	Sculpture	Sculptor	Architect	Installed	Medium	Notes
Marion County Courthouse	West Virginia; Adams & Jefferson Streets, Fairmont		Entrance Pediment	W. D. Priest of Whyte & Priest	Yost & Packard	1900	stone	
Tyler County Courthouse and Jail	West Virginia; Main & Dodd Streets, Middlebourne		seated Justice flanked by male and female supplicants	unknown	Holmboe and Pogue	1922		The portico and pediment date from the 1922 redesign of an 1854 building.

== Washington ==
Building	Location	Image	Sculpture	Sculptor	Architect	Installed	Medium	Notes
Seattle, Washington	Washington; 117 3rd Avenue, Seattle							

== Wisconsin ==
Building	Location	Image	Sculpture	Sculptor	Architect	Installed	Medium	Notes
Wisconsin State Capitol	Wisconsin; 2 East Main Street, Madison		East pediment: Liberty Supported by the Law	Karl Bitter; John Grignola (carver)	George Browne Post & Sons	1910	Bethel Vermont granite	
Wisconsin State Capitol	Wisconsin; 2 East Main Street, Madison		West pediment: Wisconsin State Resources	Karl Bitter	George Browne Post & Sons	1917	Bethel Vermont granite	Bitter's plaster model for the west pediment.
Wisconsin State Capitol	Wisconsin; 2 East Main Street, Madison		North pediment: The Learning of the World	Attilio Piccirilli; Furio Piccirilli (carver)	George Browne Post & Sons	1915	Bethel white granite	
Wisconsin State Capitol	Wisconsin; 2 East Main Street, Madison		South pediment: Wisdom, Thought, and Reflection	Adolph Alexander Weinman	George Browne Post & Sons	1917	Bethel Vermont granite	
Germania Building	Wisconsin; 135 W. Wells Street, Milwaukee		two pediments: lower on entry portico has two putti flanking cartouche, upper with two seated figures flanking cartouche reading "1896"	Carl Kuehns of the Milwaukee Ornamental Carving Company	Schnetsky & Liebert	1896	stone	

== See also ==
- Pedimental sculptures in Canada
- Architectural sculpture
