= Governor Sharpe =

Governor Sharpe may refer to:

- Alfred Sharpe (1853–1935), 1st Governor of Nyasaland from 1907 to 1910
- Horatio Sharpe (1718–1790), 22nd Proprietary Governor of Maryland from 1753 to 1768
