= Church of All Saints (Keokuk, Iowa) =

- St. Peter Church
- U.S. National Register of Historic Places
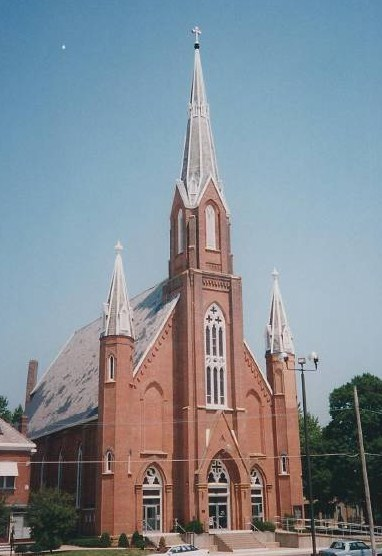

- Location within Iowa Location within the United States
- Location: 301 S. 9th St. Keokuk, Iowa
- Coordinates: 40°23′50″N 91°23′25″W
- Area: less than one acre
- Built: 1879-1885
- Architect: William John Dillenburg; Joseph Conradi
- Architectural style: Late Gothic Revival
- NRHP reference No.: 83000384
- Added to NRHP: July 14, 1983

The Church of All Saints is a parish of the Catholic Church in the Diocese of Davenport. The church is located in Keokuk, Iowa, United States. The church building is listed on the National Register of Historic Places as St. Peter Church, the name of the congregation that built it.

The parish of All Saints was established in 1982 as the result of the consolidation of the parishes of St. Peter's (1856), St. Mary's (1867), and St. Francis de Sales (1870). All three contributed furniture and fixtures to the newly constituted All Saints. The parish church is the former St. Peter's; St. Francis de Sales was subsequently demolished.

== History ==
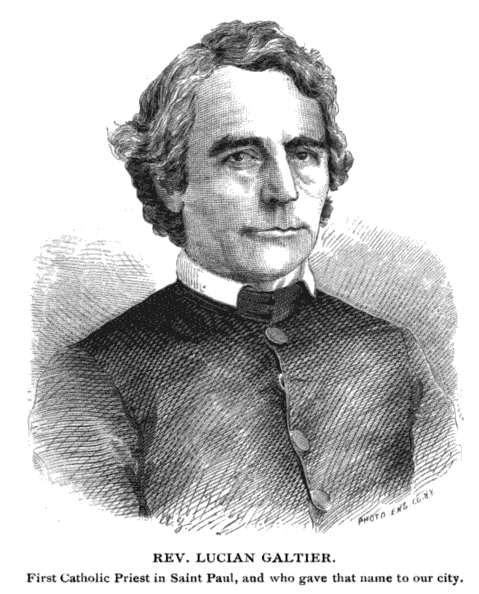
Rev. Lucien Galtier, who formed St. John the Evangelist Church in Keokuk

The area of present-day Keokuk was within the Half-Breed Tract, land set aside by the United States Senate on January 18, 1825, for settlement of mixed-race descendants of the Sac and Fox tribes. Over the years, some of the women had married French trappers who worked the area, and their descendants were excluded from communal lands because their fathers lacked tribal status. Mixed-race families could live in the Half-Breed Tract but could not sell individual allotments until Congress changed the law in 1837.

In 1824 Bishop Louis Dubourg of New Orleans appointed the Rev. Charles Felix Van Quickenborne, SJ the Vicar General of Upper Louisiana, which included the Half-Breed Tract. He is the first priest known to have visited the area of present-day Keokuk, visiting in 1832 and 1833, after that section of Iowa was opened to settlement. He recommended a church be built, as he thought the funds could be easily raised. The next priest to visit the area was the Rev. Peter Paul Lefevere. He reported that the number of Catholics in the area numbered 38. In 1840 the Rev. Samuel Charles Mazzuchelli, OP from St. Paul's Church in Burlington added Keokuk to his missionary area. The same year the Rev. John George Alleman started visiting Keokuk regularly from St. Joseph's in Fort Madison; however, he was unable to raise enough money to build a church. He would continue visiting the area until 1848.

The first parish established in the town was named St. John the Evangelist and was founded in 1844 by Rev. Lucien Galtier, who was named the first pastor in Keokuk. The church was a log structure built on the corner of Second and Blondeau Streets. The church was built by Hugh V. Gildea from Dubuque with the help of Father Galtier. A future historian of Keokuk, Virginia Wilcox Ivins, remembered seeing the "elegant" priest hammering on the church roof on a hot July day when she was twelve years old. The church building measured 20-by-30-foot (6.1 by 9.1 m) and was 12 feet (4 m) high. It cost $598.37, and was paid for from funds received from the Society of the Propagation of the Faith. Galtier stayed only a few months, and Father Alleman had care of the Keokuk parish again. The Rev. Jean Villars became its pastor in 1848 and he stayed for nine years. The Rev. William Emonds was sent to Keokuk in 1855 to buy back property lost by the church. Instead, he bought new property on which St. Peter's Church was founded. By now there were quite a few German Catholics in Keokuk, who had immigrated after the 1848 Revolutions, and they wanted a priest who spoke their language. After 1857 St. Peter's became the only Catholic church in Keokuk. St. John the Evangelist was abandoned and Father Villars recalled. The cornerstone was laid for the original church on Exchange Street between Ninth and Tenth Streets on April 20, 1856.

St. Mary's Church was established in 1867 to serve the pastoral needs of German immigrants. The parish built a red brick church north of St. Peter's in 1911. St. Francis de Sales Church was begun in 1870 to serve the neighborhoods on the east side of town. All three parishes became part of the Davenport Diocese when it was established in 1881. St. Francis parish built a stone church in 1899, designed by James J. Egan who had earlier designed both Sacred Heart Cathedral in Davenport and St. Ambrose Cathedral in Des Moines.

As St. Peter's grew the parish decided to relocate the church in 1872. Three lots were purchased at Ninth and Bank Streets. Plans for the new church building were completed in 1878 by Chicago architect William John Dillenburg, who had been an assistant architect in completing the Cologne Cathedral in Germany. He is also responsible for the Church of St. John the Baptist in Burlington, Iowa. Both All Saints and St. John's are similar in design and were built at the same time. Ground was broken for the new structure in 1879, and its cornerstone was laid on June 12, 1881. Crowell and Worley of Keokuk served as the general contractors, Robert Burns of Keokuk was responsible for the carpentry, and Adam Mullen, of Chicago did the roof work.

The parish pastor, the Rev. Thomas O'Reilly, underestimated the cost to build the church. As a result, it had to be built in stages over an extended period of time. The total cost of construction came in at $50,000. It was completed in 1885.

In 1886 Franciscan Sisters from Peoria, Illinois opened St. Joseph Hospital next to St. Mary's Church. In 1975 it merged with Graham Hospital and became Keokuk Area Hospital.

The commission for the church's solid marble altar was given to Joseph Conradi of St. Louis in 1904. The building's foundations had to be reinforced to support the weight of the new altar. The baptistery was added to the sacristy area at the same time. The altar was dedicated on October 8, 1905.

Because of declining numbers of clergy in the diocese, and the declining population in Keokuk, the diocese decided to consolidate the three parishes into one. The Church of All Saints was established in 1982. It was at this time that the Chapel of the Angels was added in the left sacristy area of the church. The chapel used the angel statues that flanked the high altar at St. Mary's, the pews from St. Francis de Sales, as well as other elements from the three churches. The Blessed Sacrament is housed in the chapel, and it is used for weekday Masses and First Friday Adoration. The organ from St. Mary's was placed in the main church.

A Monument Garden is located near the chapel entrance behind the rectory. The cornerstones from the first St. Peter's Church (1856), the second St. Mary's Church (1911), the second St. Francis de Sales Church (1898), and St. Mary's School (1907) were refaced to designate All Saints parish.

== Architecture ==
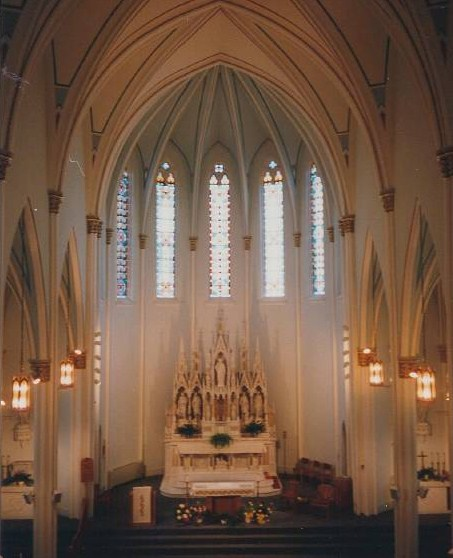
Interior of the church showing the marble carved altar by Joseph Conradi

The Church of All Saints is an outstanding example late Gothic Revival style in the state of Iowa. The 60-by-140-foot (18 by 43 m) structure follows a basilica plan. The exterior is composed of local clay brick, and magnesium limestone for the coping on the pilasters, window sills and buttresses. It rests on a foundation of rough coursed limestone. The verticality of the church is emphasized by its central tower that rises 180 feet (55 m) and by the corner towers that are 75 feet (23 m) tall. Stepped corbel tables are located below the eaves of the steeply pitched gable roof and horizontal corbelling is located at the central spire base. Above is an eight-sided offset tower that terminates in four gabled facades. In each of the four facades of the tower are pointed-arched louvers in the bell chamber. An eight-sided spire culminates in a cross.

The side elevations are six bays in length and are separated by buttresses. Each bay contains a 5-by-18-foot (1.5 by 5.5 m) paired lancet window. The church's art glass windows were created in Munich, Germany and installed by the A. Misch Company of Chicago in 1884 at a cost of $3,300. The window on the central tower is 30 feet (9 m) tall. It features quatrefoil, Latin cross and yin-yang-shaped lights that are set within rosette forms.

The interior is divided into three naves with vaulted ceilings that are divided by columns with capitals in the Corinthian order. A double gallery is located in the rear of the church. In the apse on the opposite side of the church is a carved white marble altar. The statue in the central tower of the reredos is that of Saint Peter, the church's patron saint at the time it was built. The lower level has statues of the Four Evangelists. The former altar frontal bears an image of the Lamb and the scroll with seven seals from the Book of Revelation. The Stations of the Cross that line the side walls came from Munich and were erected on February 28, 1892.

Alterations to the church include the replacement of the original wooden front doors with aluminum framed glass doors in 1968. Some of the art glass above the doors was also replaced by thin, clear, horizontal glass panels. A concrete ramp and new steps replaced the original stone steps in 1980. A new Reconciliation Room and a restroom replaced the original confessionals in the back of the church in 1982. The church was redecorated in the mid-1990s.

== Catholic schools ==
The first Catholic school was established in Keokuk by the Visitation Sisters in 1852. They opened a free school first. In 1853 they started a new convent and a select school for both boarders and day students. St. Peter's Parish desired a parochial school, but the Visitation Sisters' rule forbade them from teaching in parochial schools. The parish school was started by 1859, and the Rev. Louis DeCailly asked the School Sisters of Notre Dame to teach in the school. They taught there from 1861 to 1864. They withdrew from teaching when Father DeCailly wanted to start a high school for girls, and the Notre Dame Sisters felt it would infringe on the Visitation Academy.

Lay teachers took over the teaching responsibilities in the parish school. The Visitation Sisters left in 1867 because of financial problems that resulted from the building of a new school. The parish took over the school and the Daughters of Charity came to teach the same year. The common school and the select school were merged in 1877. The grade school was renamed St. Vincent's. The Notre Dame Sisters came back to Keokuk and staffed the parochial school at St. Mary's Church. St. Peter's High School continued until a central Catholic high school named Cardinal Stritch was opened in 1965. The Daughters of Charity left Keokuk in 1996. Because of low enrollment and financial concerns, Cardinal Stritch consolidated with Holy Trinity High School in Fort Madison in 2006. St. Vincent's Elementary School, which includes preschool through fifth grade, moved into the former Cardinal Stritch building.
