= Horatio Sharpe =

Colonial Governor of Maryland

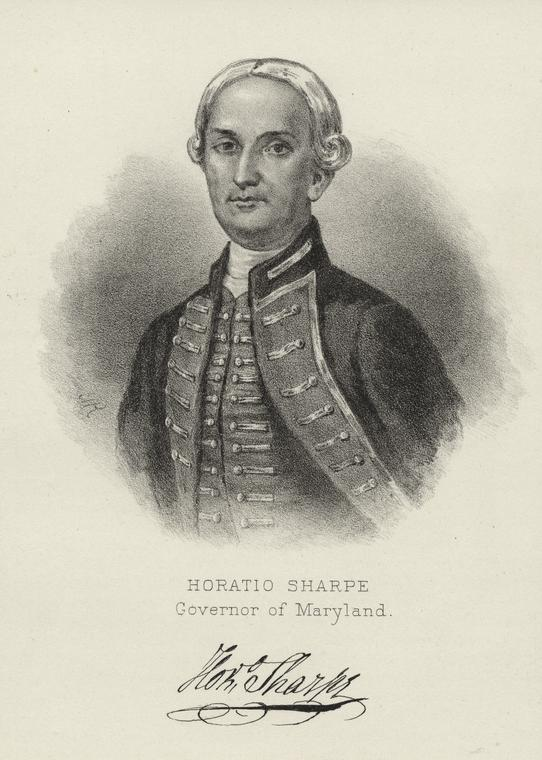

11th Governor of Restored Proprietary Government
- In office 1753–1768
- Preceded by: Benjamin Tasker Sr.
- Succeeded by: Robert Eden

Personal details
- Born: 1718 Hull, Yorkshire, England
- Died: November 9, 1790 (aged 71–72) Hampstead, London, England
- Profession: Colonial governor

Horatio Sharpe (1718 – November 9, 1790) was the 22nd proprietary governor of Maryland from 1753 to 1768 under the restored proprietary government of Maryland.

== Early life ==
Horatio Sharpe was born in Hull, Yorkshire, England in 1718 to parents William Sharpe Sr. and Margaret Beake, of Beak Street, Piccadilly in London and Elstree in Hertfordshire. He was one of 16 children, of whom nine brothers and four sisters survived their father. Sharpe's older brothers were William, John, Nicholas, Joshua, Thomas, Charles, Gregory, and Philip Sharpe. His four sisters were Mary, Elizabeth, Gulielma-Maria, and Anne. His brother Gregory Sharpe (1713–1771) was appointed Master of the Temple in 1763 and was chaplain to George III. His brother William Sharpe of Brocklee Hill, Elstree in Hertfordshire (b. abt 1696 – d. 1767) was clerk of the council. His brother John Sharpe Esq. of Lincoln's Inn (abt 1700–1756) was Solicitor to the Treasury.

== Career ==
He was commissioned in the King's forces in 1745 as a captain and fought in the Jacobite rising against the Jacobites. He served with the 20th Regiment of Foot and the Marines. Later, he is found in the West Indies as a Lieutenant-Colonel. He served until his appointment by Frederick Calvert, 6th Baron Baltimore as the proprietary Maryland colonial governor. (Following Samuel Ogle, who had died.) Horatio Sharpe was the brother of Lord Baltimore's guardian (William). He arrived in Maryland in August 1753.

Appointed by the King in 1754 as the Royal Commander in Chief of all British Forces and commander of colonial forces for the protection of Virginia and adjoining Colonies, Sharpe was superseded by the arrival of Maj. Gen. Edward Braddock in 1755. Before Sharpe's service, Colonel James Innes had commanded all provincial soldiers.

He was a civil and military administrator, gentleman-farmer, enslaver, horse collector, and friend of George Mason and George Washington.

Horatio Sharpe also built Whitehall on the outskirts of Annapolis (Whitehall Road, Skidmore, Anne Arundel County). Now a National Historic Landmark, Whitehall was designed by Joseph Horatio Anderson, who was also the architect of the Maryland State House. It served as Sharpe's residence from his enforced retirement in 1769 until his return to England in 1773.

Between 1760 and 1765, according to a 1912 biography, "The governor spent as much of his time as was possible at Whitehall, amusing himself with his favourite pursuit of farming", with most of the labor provided by enslaved people:

No kinder master could be found, and his large retinue of negro slaves and indentured white servants were supremely happy. The duty of looking after the welfare and comfort of those under him was faithfully discharged.

== Return to England ==
He returned to England to attend to family matters in 1773 and remained there until he died in 1790. Horatio Sharpe is named explicitly in the Maryland Confiscation Act of 1780. He was encouraged by the new state of Maryland to return from England to Maryland and reclaim his lands. Barring that, he was permitted to sell or dispose of all his Maryland properties. Sharpe sold or gave his Maryland properties to his long-time secretary, John Ridout, who had stayed in Maryland during the Revolutionary War to protect his former employer's property.

Sir Robert Eden, 1st Baronet (1741–1784) was the last Royal Governor of Maryland. He followed Horatio Sharpe as governor in 1769.

== Death ==
Sharpe died on November 9, 1790, in Hampstead in London.

== Legacy ==
In 1763, Sharpsburg, Maryland, was named in honor of Sharpe by his friend and the town's founder, Joseph Chapline.

== See also ==
- Kingdom of Great Britain

Political offices
Preceded by Benjamin Tasker, Sr.	Provincial Governor of Maryland; 1753—1768	Succeeded by Sir Robert Eden, 1st Baronet, of Maryland
