= Eternal Light Flagstaff =

Sculpture in Manhattan, New York, U.S.

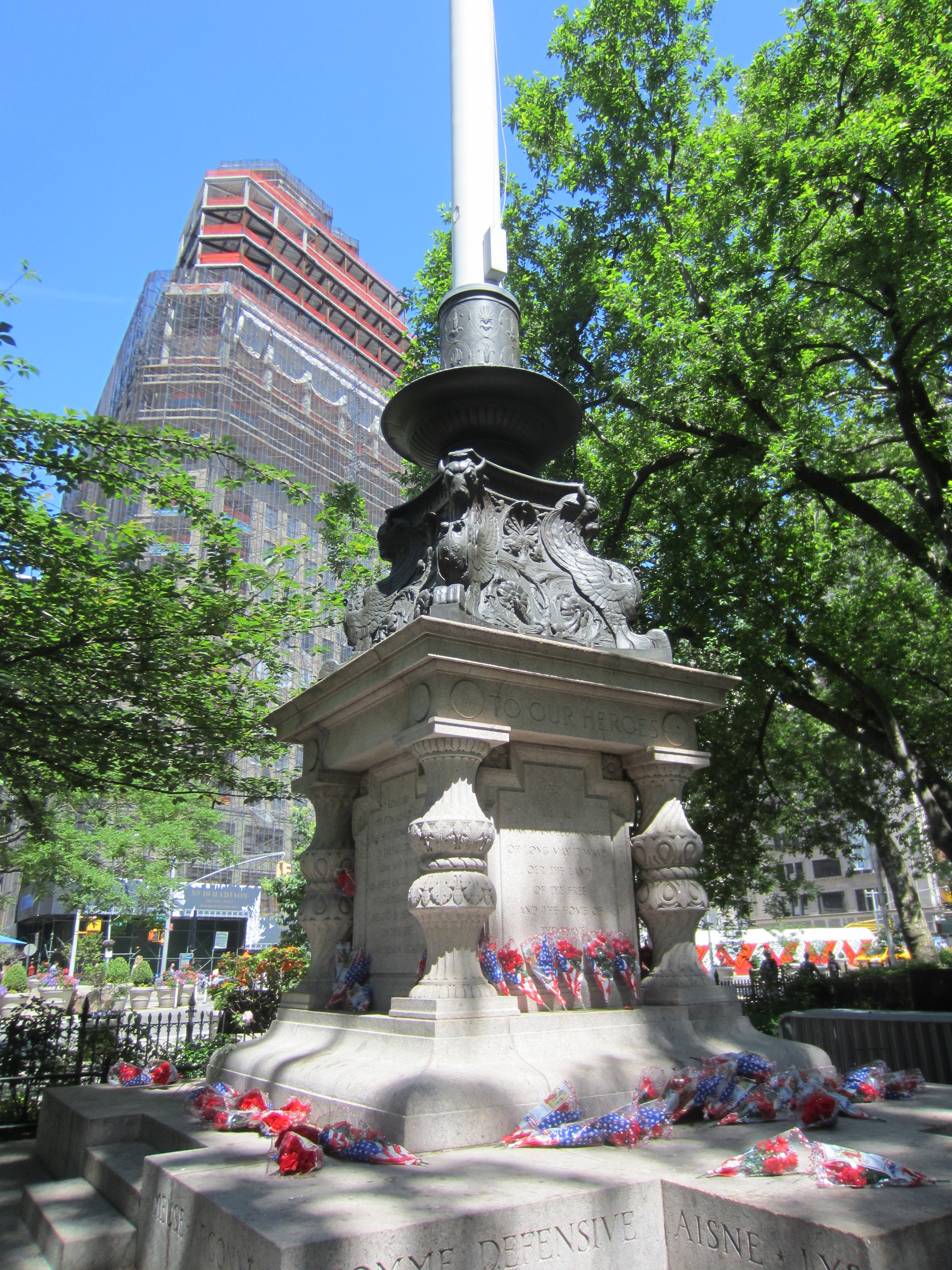
- (2014)

- Artist: Design: Thomas Hastings; Sculpture: Paul Wayland Bartlett
- Year: 1923–1924
- Type: Sculpture and flagstaff
- Medium: Sculpture: granite, bronze Flagstaff: metal
- Location: Madison Square Park Manhattan, New York City; 40.74205°N 73.98871°W

The Eternal Light Flagstaff is a memorial monument located in Madison Square Park in Manhattan, New York City which was dedicated on Armistice Day, November 11, 1923, and commemorates the return to the United States of members of the United States armed forces who fought in World War I, who were officially received by the city on that site in 1918. It was designed by architect Thomas Hastings of Carrère and Hastings, and consists of a flagstaff and a sculpture by Paul Wayland Bartlett. The memorial was commissioned by department store magnate Rodman Wanamaker and cost $25,000 to construct. It was completed in 1924.

The 125-foot (38 m) flagstaff was originally made of Oregon pine, which in 1976 was replaced with one made from metal. At the top is a luminere in the shape of a star, which, as a tribute to those who gave their lives in the war, is intended to be lit at all times. The lights inside it are connected in such a way that if one circuit fails, another one would take over.

The flagstaff is set on an ornamental pedestal made of Milford pink granite, with a cap made of bronze which includes garlands and rams heads. The pedestal is inscribed with the sites of battles, as well as a tribute to those soldiers, sailors and marines who died in the war. The inscription reads, in part:

An Eternal Light
An inspiration
and a Promise of
Enduring Peace
This star was lighted
November XI MCMXXIII

In memory of those who have
made the supreme sacrifice
for the triumph of the
Free Peoples of the World

In 1927, in the middle of a parade celebrating his accomplishments, Charles A. Lindbergh placed a memorial wreath on the monument. The press of people trying to watch was so great that the barriers put up to hold the crowd broke, and police had to create a human chain to do the job.

The Eternal Light Flagstaff is part of the New York City Department of Parks and Recreation's "Art in the Parks" collection.
