= Neptune Pool =

Outdoor swimming pool ensemble at Hearst Castle, in San Simeon, California

Coordinates: 35°41′08″N 121°10′09″W

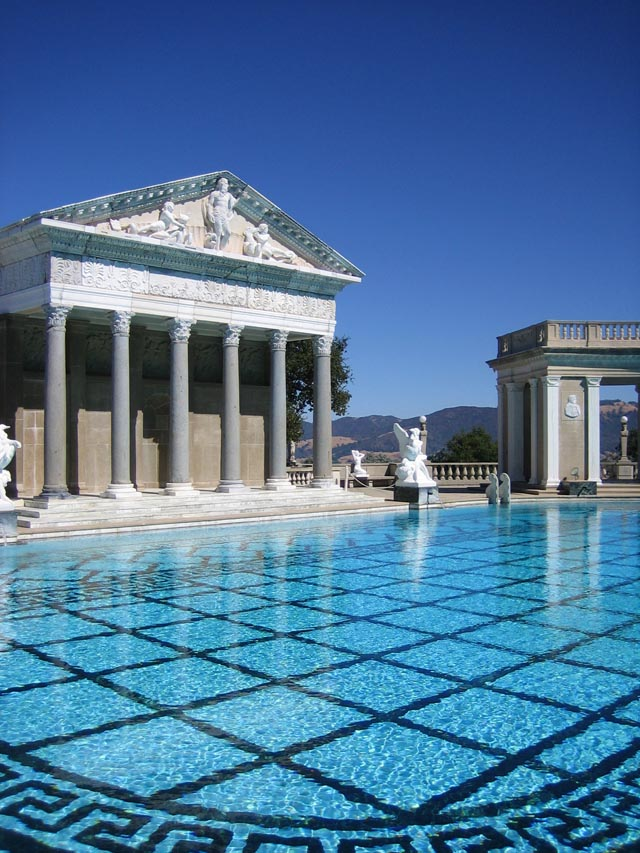
Neptune Pool and Roman Temple facade.

The Neptune Pool is an outdoor swimming pool ensemble at Hearst Castle, in San Simeon, California. As well as a large swimming pool, the terrace also includes fountains, ornamental pools, sculptures, marble pavilions, alabaster lanterns, dressing rooms, and a mainly reconstructed ancient temple facade.

The Neptune Terrace, including its huge pool shell, are raised up behind massive retaining walls on the Hearst Castle ridge-line in the Santa Lucia Mountains. It is to the north and lower than the main Casa Grande and the guest house terrace, with vistas of the ranch, Point San Simeon coastline, and Pacific Ocean.

In 2014, the pool was drained due to severe drought conditions in Southern California. The pool had been leaking and evaporating 5,000 US gallons (19,000 L; 4,200 imp gal) of water per day. Extensive renovations began in 2017 to completely replace the pool's tile base and fix the leaks which had plagued it since its construction. The pool was temporarily filled for the first time since 2014 that August to make sure the leaks had been repaired before the water was subsequently returned to the local watershed. In August, 2018 the pool restoration was completed and the pool was refilled. In 2019, the pool was opened to the public by purchasing tickets with donations which helps fund the castle's art conservation and education programs. The castle was closed to visitors in 2020 due to the COVID-19 pandemic.

== Design ==
=== History ===
Designed by architect Julia Morgan, the Neptune Pool with terrace elements was started in 1924. Albert Solon and Frank Schemmel of Solon and Schemmel Tile Company came to Hearst Castle to perform the tile work. The Neptune Pool was built and rebuilt three times, each version a larger size. After the 1926 and 1934 redesigns and re-buildings, it was finally deemed completed by William Randolph Hearst in 1936.

=== Scale ===
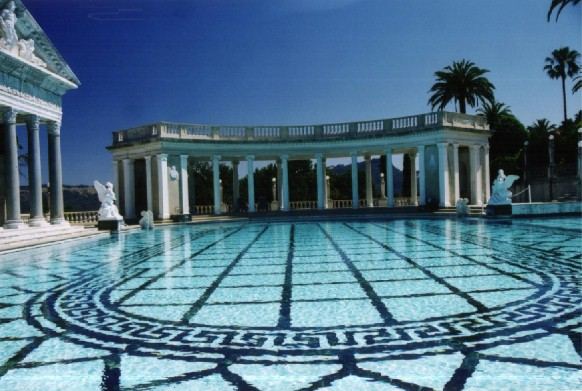
Long secondary axis of the Neptune Pool, with colonnaded pavilion as terminus element.

The Neptune Pool is 58 feet (18 m) wide except for the 95 feet (29 m) width at the primary axis fountain—alcove section, and the secondary axis pool length is 104 feet (32 m). The depth varies from 3.5 feet (1.1 m) at the west 'shallow' end, to 10 feet (3.0 m) at pools' main drains.

The fountains and pool are fed by spring water piped from the Santa Lucia Mountains, and the pool alone holds 345,000 US gallons (1,310,000 L; 287,000 imp gal) of water.

=== Architectural and landscape elements ===
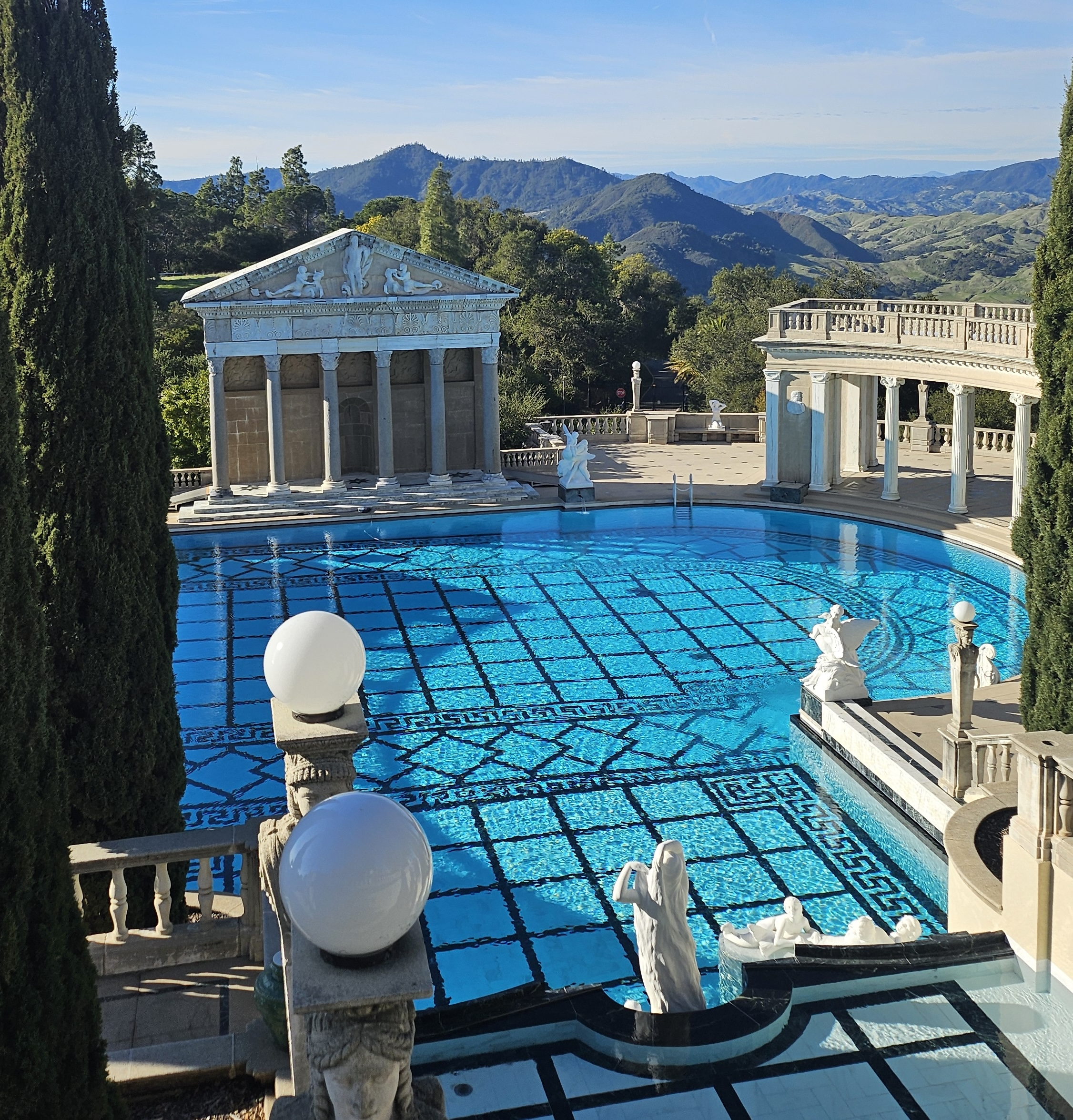
Primary axis view: from main entry stairs, with statues and formal fountain pools, to Neptune terrace; with Roman temple terminus feature.

Light-veined Vermont marble decorates the flooring and side walls of the swimming and ornamental pools, and the colonnades.

The swimming pool is surrounded by Ancient Roman Revival and Greek Revival style pavilions and colonnades. The pool's main axis centerpiece and north terminus is elaborated from parts of the façade of an Ancient Roman temple that William Randolph Hearst had purchased in Europe and imported to San Simeon. It is symmetrically framed by the colonnaded pavilions as the secondary axis' west and east terminus elements.

17th-century Italian Neoclassical bas-reliefs are upon the sides of the colonnades. The 'Neptune' and 'Nereid' statues, first atop the cascade, were moved to present positions in the Roman temple's pediment. New classical sculptures were commissioned by sculptor Charles Cassou. His 'Neptune statuary group,' planned from the late 1920s for a small cascade pool, was never installed. His ‘Venus’ was.

== In films and on television ==
- The Neptune pool was used as the set for the entrance of Crassus' villa in Kubrick's Spartacus.
- The Lady Gaga video "G.U.Y." was shot at various locations at Hearst Castle, including the pool. Due to drought conditions and leaks in the pool, the Neptune Pool was drained in 2014. However, the pool was filled for the music video.
- Featured by Huell Howser in California's Gold Episode 702
- Shown in the album cover of "A R C H I T E C T U R E" by Cight

== See also ==
- List of works by Julia Morgan
- Pedimental sculptures in the United States
