= Washington County Courthouse (Nebraska) =

- U.S. National Register of Historic Places
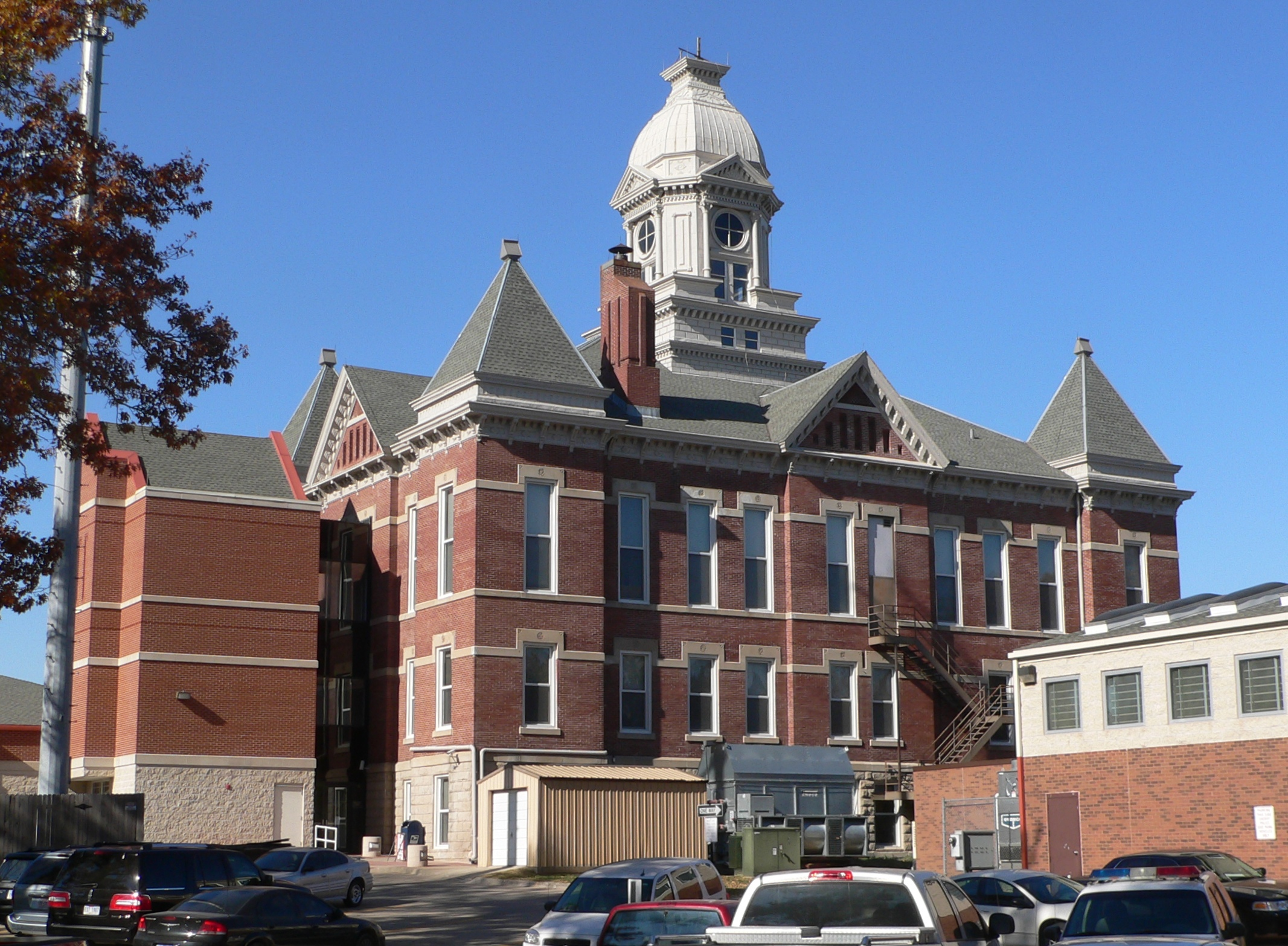

- Location within Nebraska Location within the United States
- Location: 16th St. between Colfax and South Sts., Blair, Nebraska
- Coordinates: 41°32′24″N 96°08′06″W
- Area: 2.5 acres (1.0 ha)
- Built: 1889-91
- Architect: Placey, O.H.
- Architectural style: Renaissance
- MPS: County Courthouses of Nebraska MPS
- NRHP reference No.: 89002221
- Added to NRHP: January 10, 1990

The Washington County Courthouse in Blair, Nebraska was built during 1889–91. It was listed on the National Register of Historic Places in 1990.

It was designed by Lincoln, Nebraska, architect O.H. Placey. It has four corner towers and a central dome. Its north and west pediments include metal sculpture.

An unusual feature is the pedimental sculpture in two pediments, consisting of painted metal forms. These include symbolism of "cornucopia, wheat, pumpkins [which] call attention to the fertile agricultural foundation of the county, while the ship in full sail likely recalls the immigrant experience and the shields symbolize county government."
