= Joseph Conradi =

Swiss-American architect and sculptor

- Born: 1867; Berne, Switzerland
- Died: 1936 (aged 68–69); Los Angeles, California
- Known for: Joseph Conradi, Architect and sculptor

Joseph Conradi (1867–1936) was a Swiss-born American sculptor and architect, who designed a number of Catholic churches, schools, convents and rectories in the United States.

== Personal life ==
Born in Berne, Switzerland, in 1867 Conradi studied in Italy and came to the US in 1887, settling in St. Louis and established a practice first specializing in sculpture and later architecture. For a time he entered practice with Theodore Schrader under the name Schrader and Conradi. In about 1915 he moved to Los Angeles where he was associated with Albert C. Martin, Sr.

== Works include ==
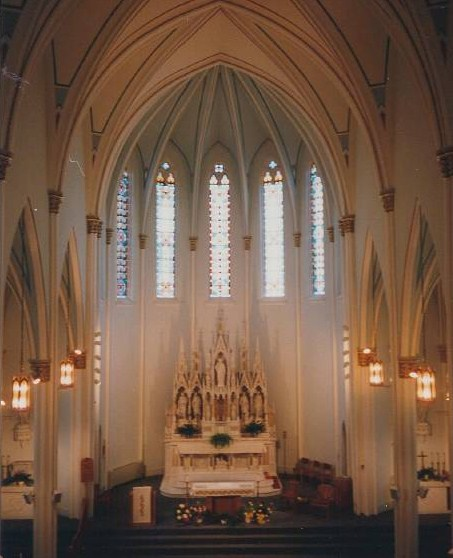
The altar in the Church of All Saints in Keokuk, Iowa

- St. Andrew Church, St Louis Missouri
- Most Holy Trinity Church, St Louis Missouri
- St. Matthews Parish Complex, St Louis, Missouri
- St. Aloysius Gonzaga Church, St. Louis, Missouri
- The Tower of St. Alphonsus Liguori (Rock) Church, St. Louis, Missouri
- Altar. All Saints Church Keokuk, Iowa
- St. Alphonsus Church, Chicago, Illinois (with Adam Boos)
- Holy Cross Church, St. Louis, Missouri (with Ruedell & Odenthal of Cologne)
- St. Liborius Church sculpture and convent (with Schrader, building by William Schickel)
- St. Mary of Perpetual Help Church, Villa Ridge, MO
- St. Mary Cathedral, Wichita, Kansas
- sculpture "the spirit of progress" for the Montgomery Ward & Co. Administration Building, Chicago, Illinois
- Sacred Heart Church, Frazee, Minnesota
- sculpture for the Utah County Court House, Provo, Utah
- sculpture for St. Vincent De Paul Church, Kansas City, Missouri (with Albert C. Martin, architect)
- sculpture for Zion Lutheran Church, St. Louis Missouri (with Schrader)
- sculpture for Library of Congress, Washington DC

With Albert C. Martin Sr.:

- sculpture for Doheny Memorial Library, University of Southern California, Los Angeles, California
- fireplace for Doheny Mansion, Los Angeles, California
- sculpture for City Hall, Los Angeles, California
- sculpture for St Vincent Church, Los Angeles, California
- sculpture for Los Angeles Times Building, Los Angeles, California
