= O.H. Placey =

American architect

Otis H. Placey (c.1829-1892), also known as O.H. Placey, was an architect based in Lincoln, Nebraska.

He designed the Washington County Courthouse in Blair, Nebraska, built during 1889-91, which was listed on the National Register of Historic Places in 1990.
