= Apotheosis of Democracy =

Artwork by Paul Wayland Bartlett on the US Capitol

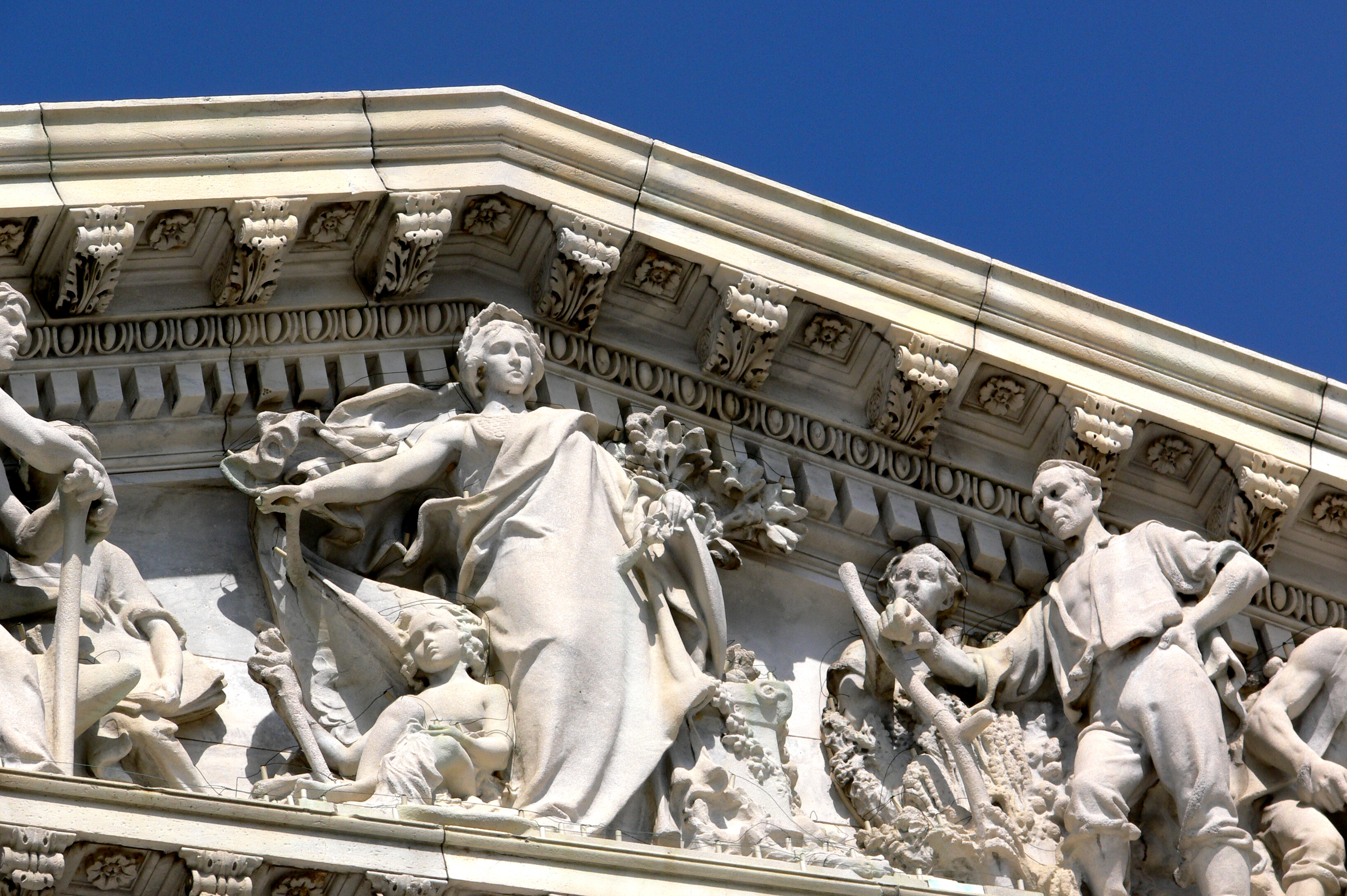
- Artist: Paul Wayland Bartlett
- Year: 1916
- Type: Marble
- Dimensions: 18 m (60 ft)
- Location: Washington, D.C., U.S.; 38°53′20.6556″N 77°0′30.88″W
- Owner: Architect of the Capitol

Apotheosis of Democracy is a public artwork by American sculptor Paul Wayland Bartlett, located on the United States Capitol House of Representatives portico's east front in Washington, D.C., United States. This sculpture was surveyed in 1993 as part of the Smithsonian's Save Outdoor Sculpture! program.

== Description ==
The pediment's center focal point is the figure of allegorical Peace, which is dressed in armor and is depicted protecting Genius. Leaning against Peace's proper right leg, Genius holds a torch that symbolizes immortality in his proper right hand. Peace stands in front of an olive tree. To Peace's proper left is a figure of Agriculture, and next to that figure is a reaper with his assistant, a farmer with his bull, a putti carrying grapes, and a mother with her child who plays with a ram. To the proper right of Peace is Industry, and next to him is a printmaker, an ironworker, a founder, a factory girl and a fisherman. The corners of the pediment have waves, which represent the Atlantic and Pacific oceans. The pediment is made of Georgia marble.

=== Condition ===
In 1993 Apotheosis of Democracy was surveyed by art conservators from the Save Outdoor Sculpture! program and was described as "well maintained."

== Acquisition, creation and installation ==
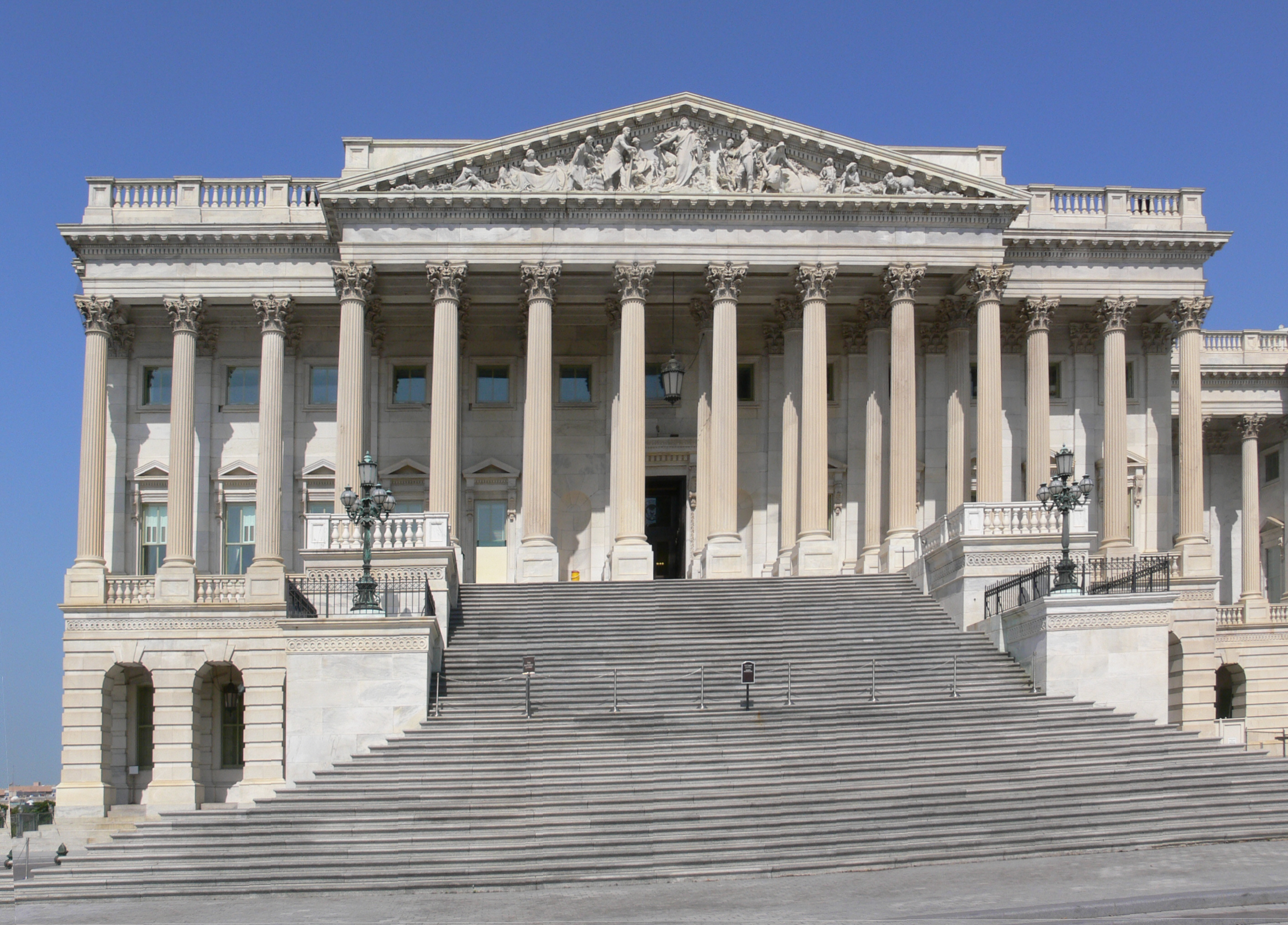

The original pediment was commissioned to Erastus Dow Palmer in 1857, however, the work was never completed due to lack of funding. Another competition was held in 1908 and Bartlett was chosen.

Barlett signed the contract for the commission in February, 1909, and in January 1915 was described as being "engaged continuously since that time" in the task, amounting to six years of work. The figures were modeled in Paris, France and Washington in the years from 1911 to 1914, and were carved by the Piccirilli Brothers from 1914 to 1916. The pediment was dedicated on August 2, 1916.

== Related works ==
In March, 1963 plaster maquettes of the pediment were given to the U.S. Government by Bartlett's stepdaughter, Armistead Peter III. The works are on display in the Capitol underground hallway that heads to the Rayburn House Office Building.

As of 1995 a Study for Apotheosis of Democracy by Bartlett was in the collection of the Westmoreland Museum of American Art. A bronze sculpture (54 x 54.5 x 18) on a wooden base, it depicts Peace and Genius. It was purchased in 1959 and as of 1995 it was surveyed as needing urgent treatment.

== See also ==
- List of public art in Washington, D.C., Ward 6
