= Paul Wayland Bartlett =

American sculptor (1865–1925)

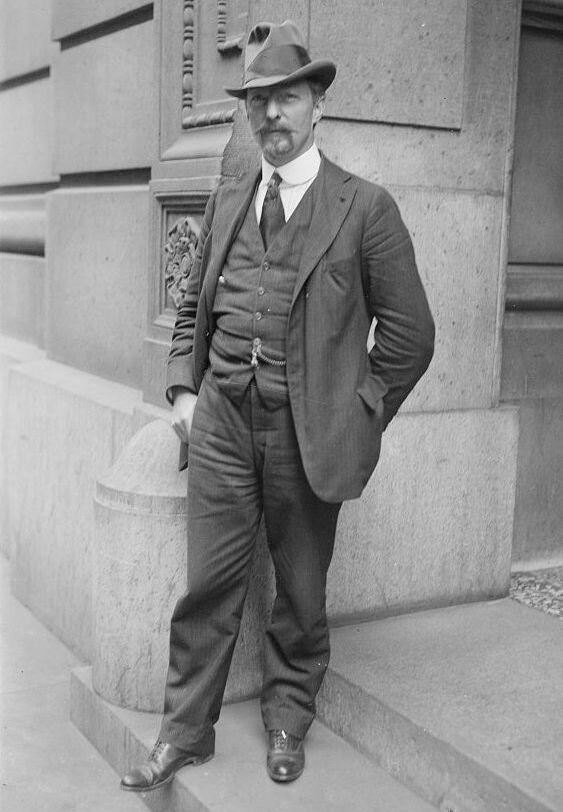
- Bartlett in 1918
- Born: January 24, 1865; New Haven, Connecticut, US
- Died: September 20, 1925 (aged 60)
- Occupation: Sculptor
- Known for: Apotheosis of Democracy
- Style: Beaux-Arts architecture
- Father: Truman Howe Bartlett

Paul Wayland Bartlett (January 24, 1865 – September 20, 1925) was an American sculptor working in the Beaux-Arts tradition of heroic realism.

== Biography ==
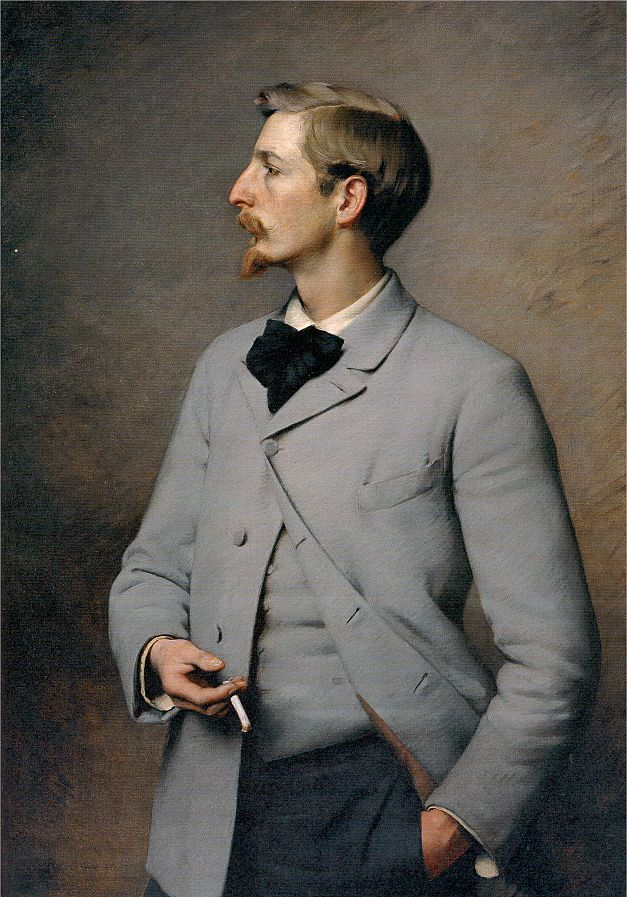
Paul Wayland Barlett c. 1890 by Charles Sprague Pearce.

Bartlett was born in New Haven, Connecticut, the son of Truman Howe Bartlett, an art critic and sculptor.

At fifteen, he began to study in Paris under Emmanuel Frémiet, modelling from animals in the Jardin des Plantes. He won a medal at the Paris Salon of 1887, and was elected as a member of the jury for the Paris Exposition Universelle of 1889 and again at the Exposition of 1900, each time sacrificing his own opportunities of receiving medals. He was 29 when the Cross of a Chevalier of the Legion of Honor was bestowed upon him. In 1903, he collaborated with the dean of American sculptors, John Quincy Adams Ward, on the models for the pediment sculptures of the New York Stock Exchange; the pediment figures were carved by the Piccirilli Brothers.

Bartlett's masterwork was the House of Representatives pediment at the U.S. Capitol building, The Apotheosis of Democracy, begun in 1908 and completed in 1916. Among his other principal works are Bohemian Bear Tamer, in the Metropolitan Museum of Art, New York; the equestrian statue of Lafayette, in the Cours Albert 1er, Paris, presented to the French Republic by the schoolchildren of America; the powerful and virile bronzes Columbus' and Michelangelo inside the Library of Congress; the Ghost Dancer, in the Pennsylvania Academy, Philadelphia; the Dying Lion; the equestrian statue of McClellan in Philadelphia; and a statue of Joseph Warren in Boston, Massachusetts. His bronze patinas of reptiles, insects and fish, several of which are in the collection of the Berkshire Museum, are also remarkable.

In 1895, he was named a Chevalier of the French Legion of Honor. In 1916, he was admitted to the American Academy of Arts and Letters. He was also a member of the National Sculpture Society and the International Society of Sculptors, Painters and Gravers.

In the mid-20th century, Bartlett's step-daughter, Caroline Ogden-Jones Peter, worked to ensure that examples of Bartlett's sculpture were distributed to museums throughout the United States. Additional examples of his sculpture, including many plaster studies as well as his personal papers are found at Tudor Place, Caroline's former home with husband, Armistead Peter 3rd; a historic house museum open to the public since 1988.

== Works ==
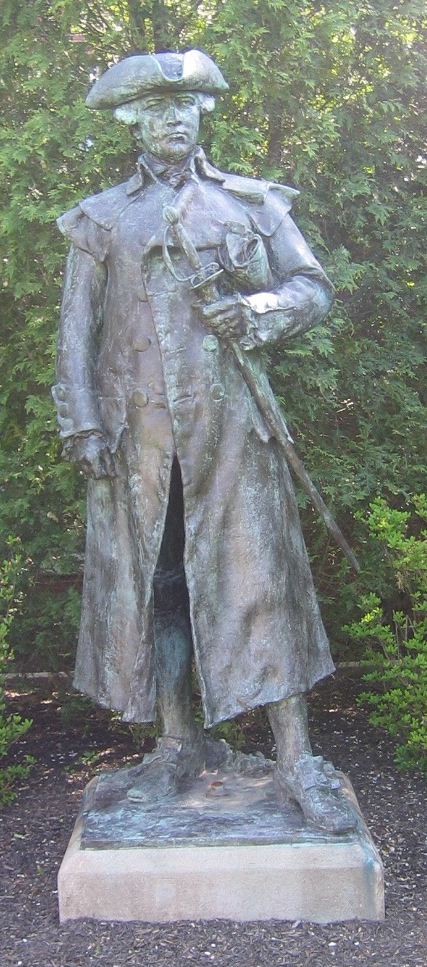
Joseph Warren, Roxbury, Massachusetts

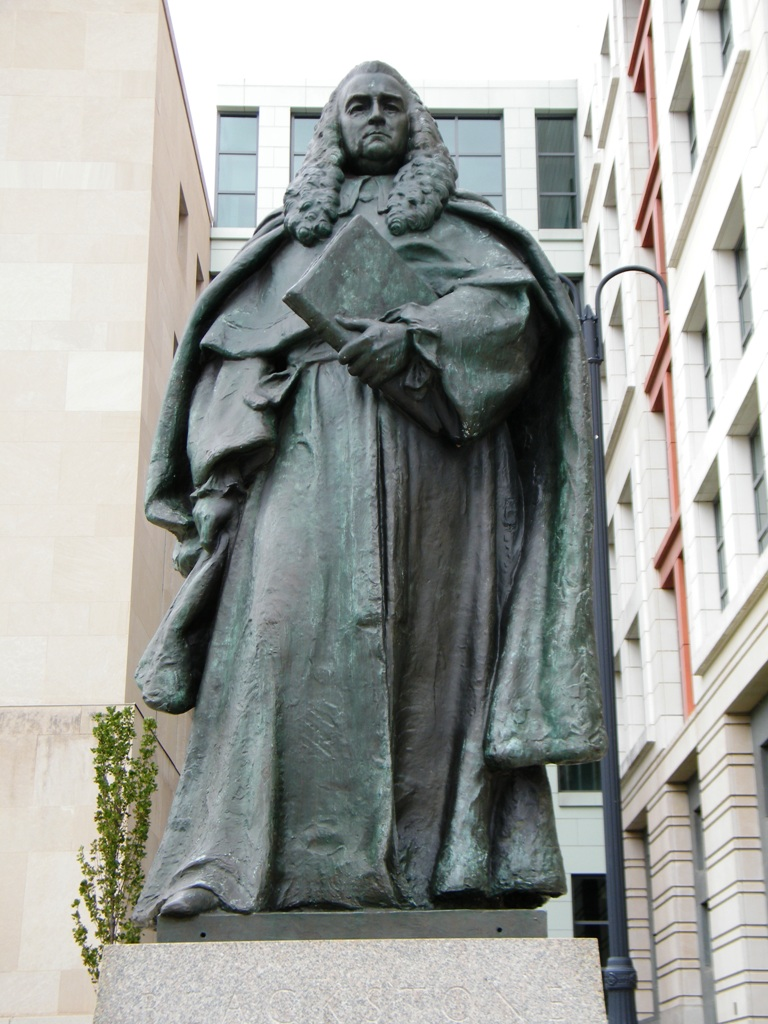
Sir William Blackstone in Washington, D.C.

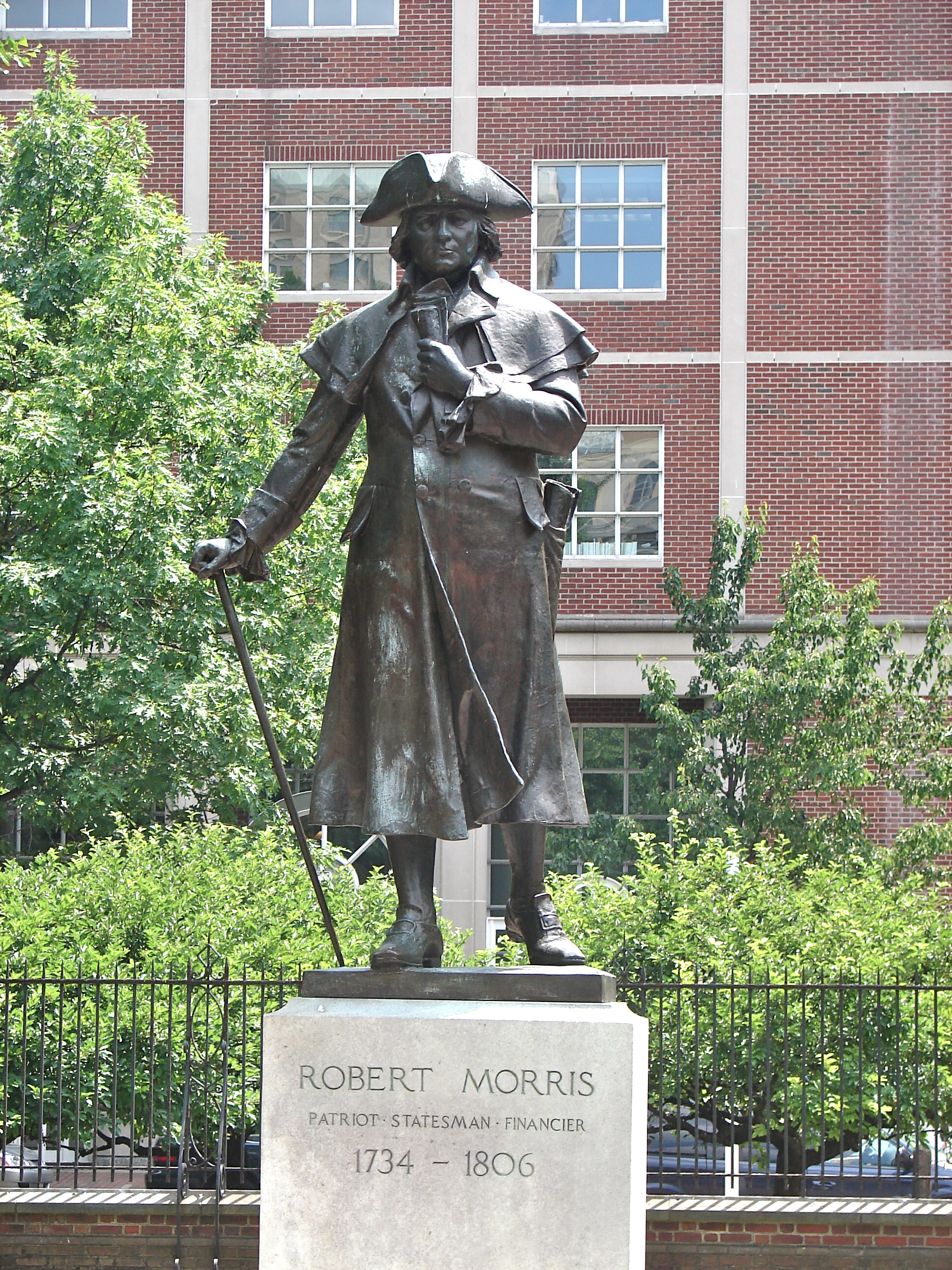
Robert Morris in Philadelphia

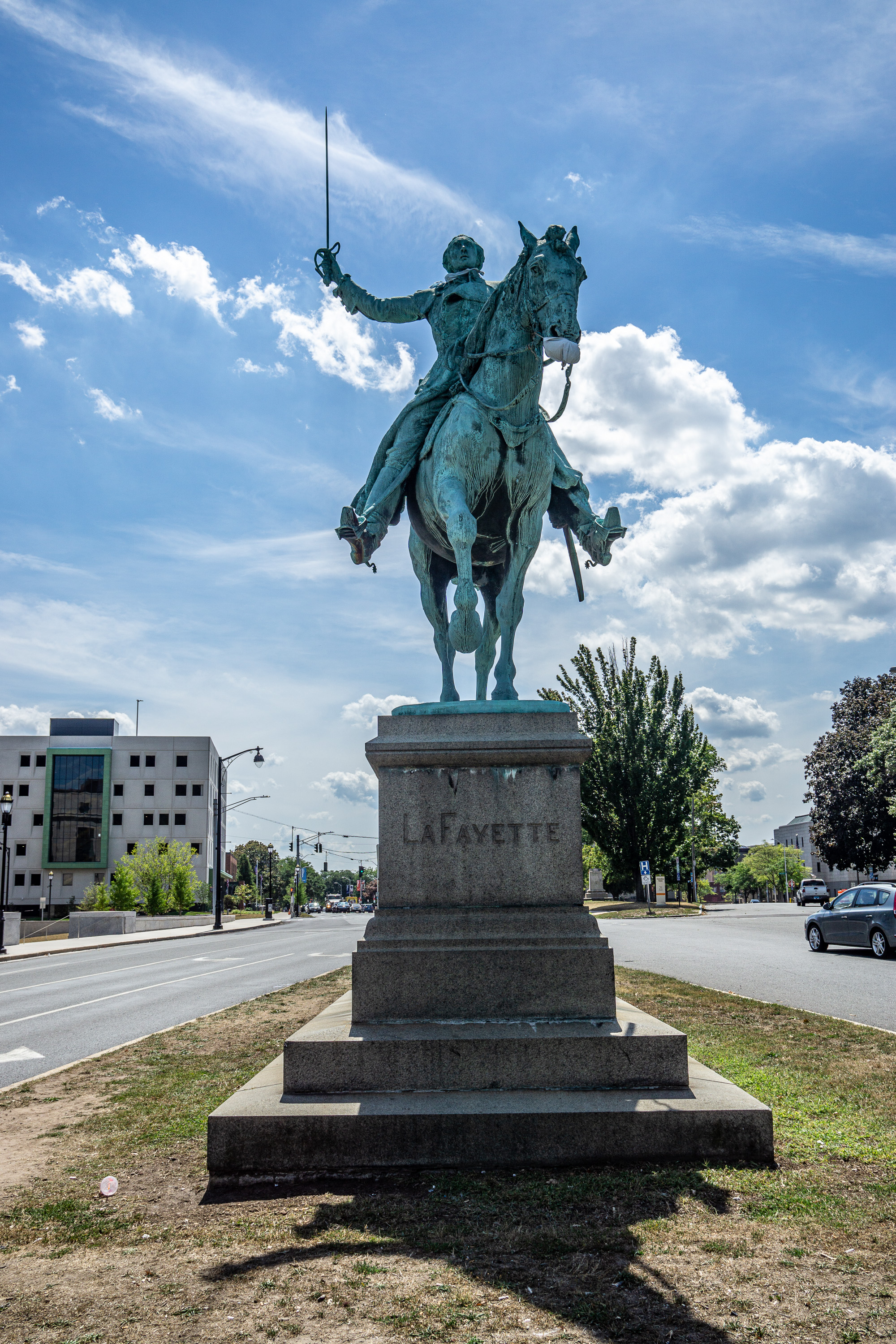
Statue of Lafayette in Hartford, Connecticut (1957)

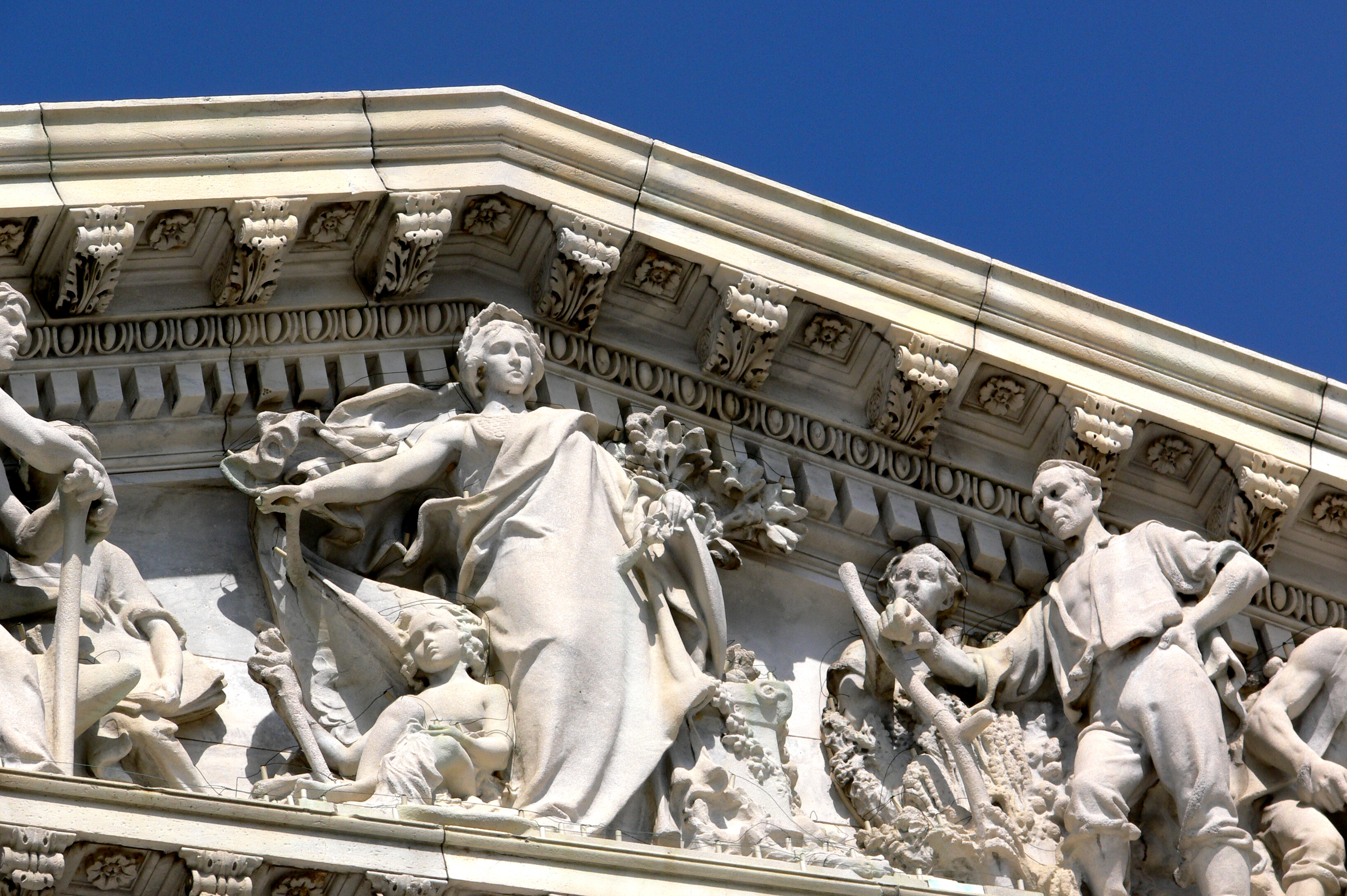
House of Representatives pediment, Apotheosis of Democracy, Washington D.C., completed 1916

== See also ==
- Eternal Light Flagstaff
