= Whitehall (Annapolis, Maryland) =

Historic house in Maryland, United States

- U.S. National Register of Historic Places
- U.S. National Historic Landmark
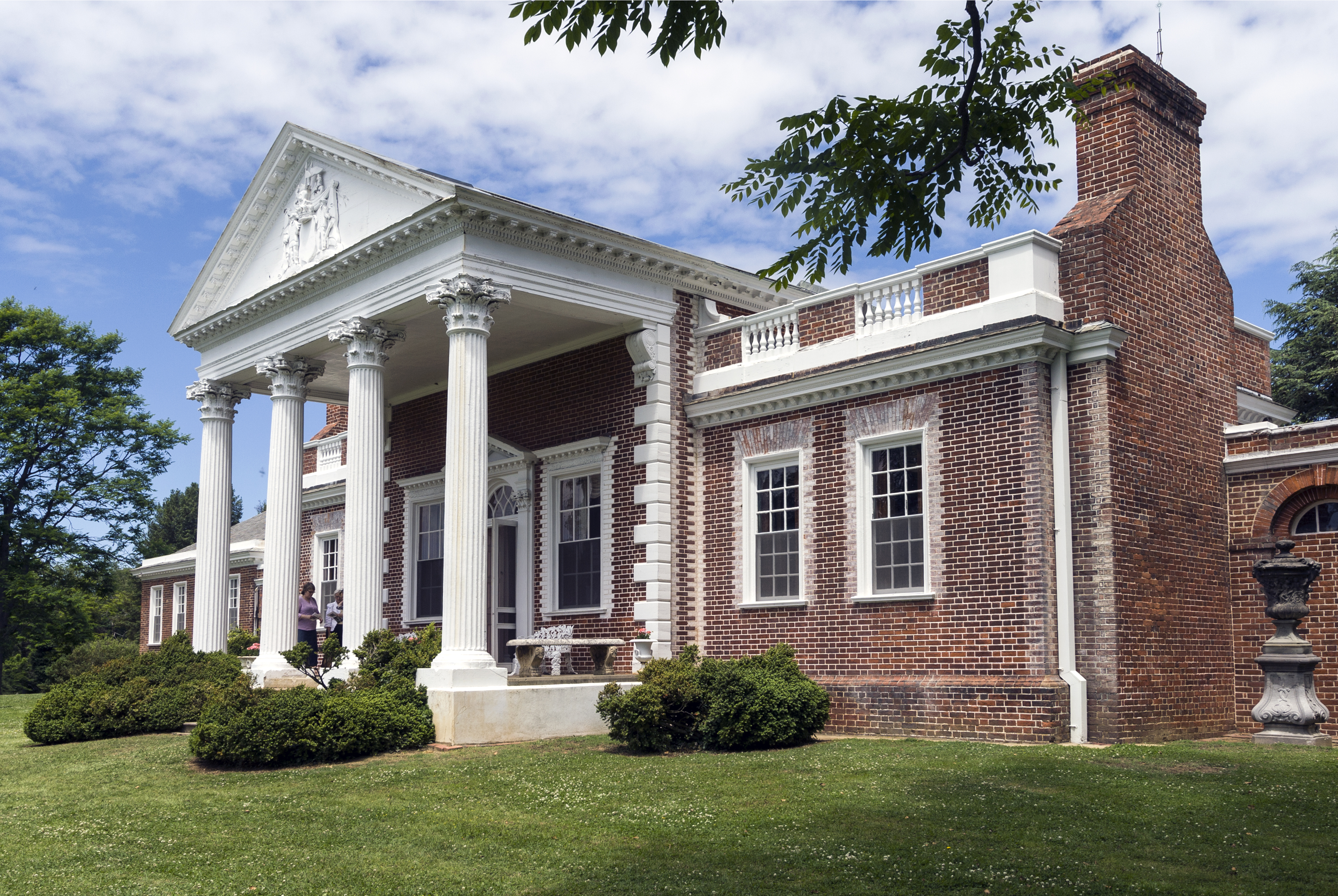
- South entry facade of Whitehall

- Location within Maryland Location within the United States
- Location: Anne Arundel County, Maryland
- Coordinates: 39°0′15″N 76°25′37″W
- Built: 1787
- Architect: John Rawlings; Joseph Horatio Anderson
- Architectural style: Georgian
- NRHP reference No.: 66000387

Significant dates
- Added to NRHP: October 15, 1966
- Designated NHL: October 9, 1960

Whitehall is a colonial home that was built beginning in 1764 near Annapolis in Anne Arundel County in the Province of Maryland by Horatio Sharpe, then the provincial governor of the British colony of Maryland.

The house is located about 7.5 miles (12.1 km) to the east of Annapolis on a peninsula between Whitehall Creek and Meredith Creek, opposite Sharpe's Point on a branch of Chesapeake Bay. The site, originally comprised about 1,000 acres (400 ha). The house is a five-part Georgian mansion of great length, only one room deep in the main section. It features elaborate original interior woodwork, attributed to William Buckland, and is one of only two pre-Revolutionary houses in the Thirteen Colonies to have a temple portico. It was designated a National Historic Landmark in 1960.

== History ==
In 1763, Governor Sharpe purchased 814 acres of Homewood's Lott. The following year, he bid for the Whitehall tract, the money going directly to the vestry of St. Margaret's Church. Sharpe commissioned the design and construction of a pavilion, gardens, parks, and entrance court of this 1,000-acre (400 ha) estate and a house for his intended bride, Mary Ogle. Unfortunately for Sharpe, the daughter of Samuel Ogle shattered his plans and married his secretary and close friend, John Ridout. The central portion of the house is believed to have been completed in 1765 as a pavilion for entertaining guests brought by boat from Annapolis. Work continued to add wings on either side until 1769, when it became Sharpe's residence following his unexpected relief as governor after 16 years by Robert Eden, a relative of Lord Baltimore.

According to a 1912 biography by Matilda Ridout Edgar, Sharpe "spent as much of his time as was possible at Whitehall, amusing himself with his favourite pursuit of farming... His Garden was his passion, and seeds and scions of trees and rare shrubs and flowers to beautify it were sent for from Holland and England and France." Although Whitehall is not considered a plantation as it did not specialize in commercial sale of cash crops, It is noted that most of the labor on the farm and gardens was provided by "his large retinue of negro slaves and indentured white servants."

Sharpe left Maryland for England in 1773 on family business and did not return before his death in London in 1790.

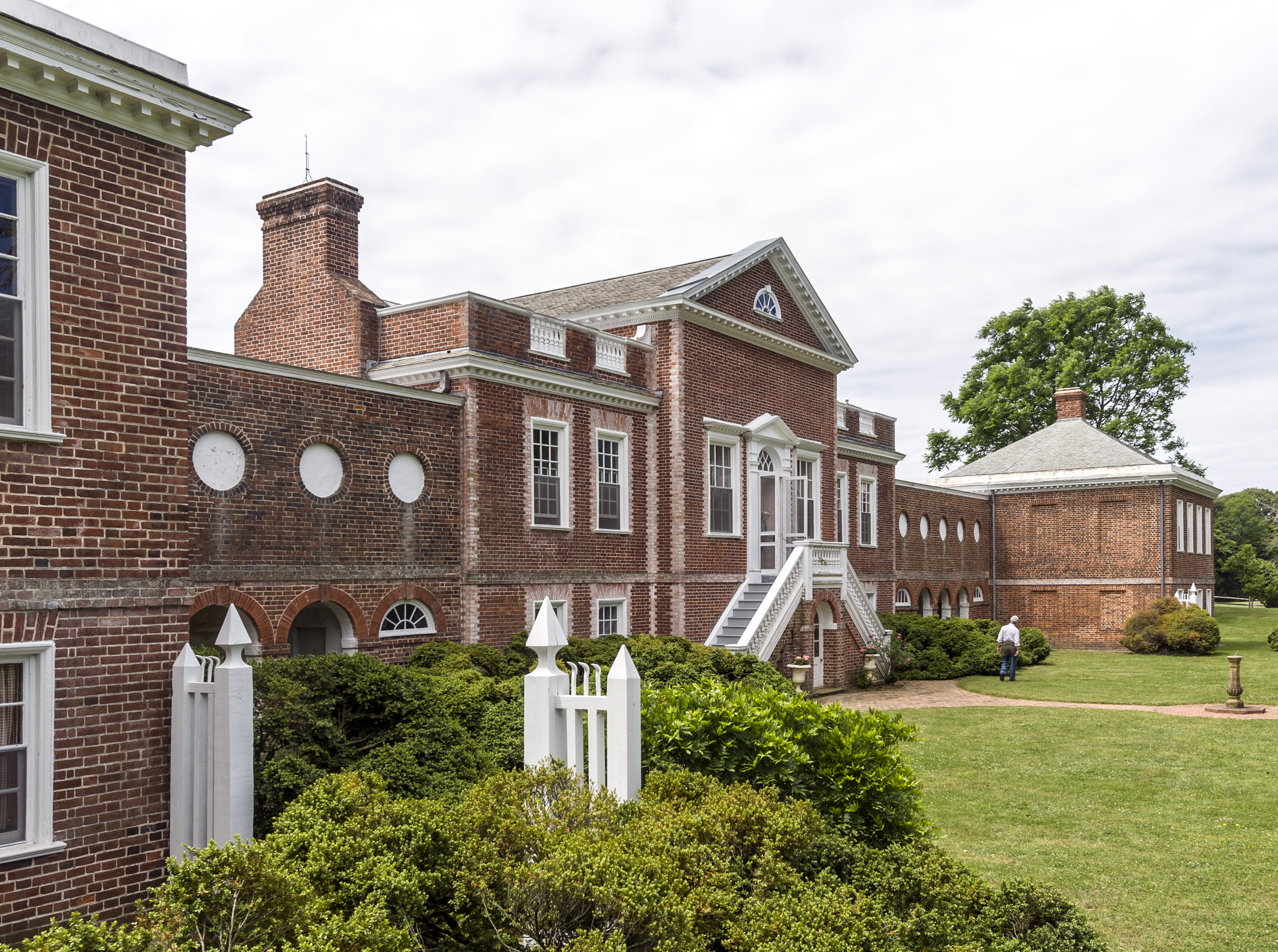
The North side of the house

The American Revolution prevented Sharpe's return and so he instructed his friend and former secretary John Ridout to sell Whitehall. Benjamin Ogle purchased the house from Ridout and two days later resold the house to Ridout for the same sum. Whitehall remained in the Ridout family for 116 years.

In 1895, Caroline Sherman Story, the widow of Maj. Gen. John Patten Story, acquired Whitehall. Upon her death in 1923, the house passed to her son, John P. Story, Jr. He sold Whitehall to St. John's College of Annapolis. From St. John's, ownership of the house passed to the Henderson family and then to the Scarlett family. The home is still privately owned.

Whitehall was restored by Charles Scarlett, Jr. in the early 20th century down to its 1787 appearance and has remained preserved in that manner to this day. While the home was built originally by provincial Governor Sharpe as a retreat and entertainment pavilion; it was later enlarged and became his residence from his retirement in 1769 until his return to England in 1773.

== House ==
Whitehall is an unusually long one-story five-part Flemish bond brick building, about 200 feet (61 m) in length, with a two-story elevation on the north side. It was designed by Joseph Horatio Anderson, who designed the third (and present) Maryland State House. The "full temple portico" on the central portion of the house, with its Corinthian columns, is one of two in the American colonies built prior to the American Revolutionary War (the other being the Jumel Mansion built by Roger Morris in New York City). From the north, the house has a seven-part elevation, with arcaded extensions comprising to the west a privy, and to the east a kitchen and well, both mostly underground, which were added in the 1950s restoration.

The main house comprises a main pavilion of three rooms, flanked by narrow relatively long hyphens that connect to the east and west end pavilions, giving a five-part elevation facing south. On the north side the ground falls away, revealing a full basement story beneath the main house, with additional extensions running beyond the end pavilions. The central house features a square main hall with a coved ceiling rising to 20 feet (6.1 m), flanked by drawing rooms on either side. The south portico faces the Severn River, while a small balcony on the north side of the main hall leads to a pair of stairs to grade level. The hyphens feature lunette windows lighting the narrow gallery to the end pavilions on the south side. Round stucco blind openings decorate the north sides of the hyphens, with an arcade on the lower level open to the north. The end pavilions are two rooms deep. The pavilions were augmented during restoration by the kitchen and privy extensions, both mostly underground. These were designed to Anderson's original plans; no trace of their existence prior to the restoration was discovered. If extensions had been built the privy would have included one of the first water closets in the United States.

A second floor was added by John Ridout in 1793, with bedrooms directly above the drawing rooms in the main pavilion, with a gabled roof whose ridge coincided with the portico roof. The second story was removed during the comprehensive restoration that began in the 1950s under Charles Scarlett, Jr.

The site immediately to the north of the house is surrounded by earth mounds in the form of a bastioned breastwork. These features were added during the 1950s restoration, stated to have been built in accordance with original plans by Anderson and Sharpe, and are not of historical origin.

== National Historic Landmark ==
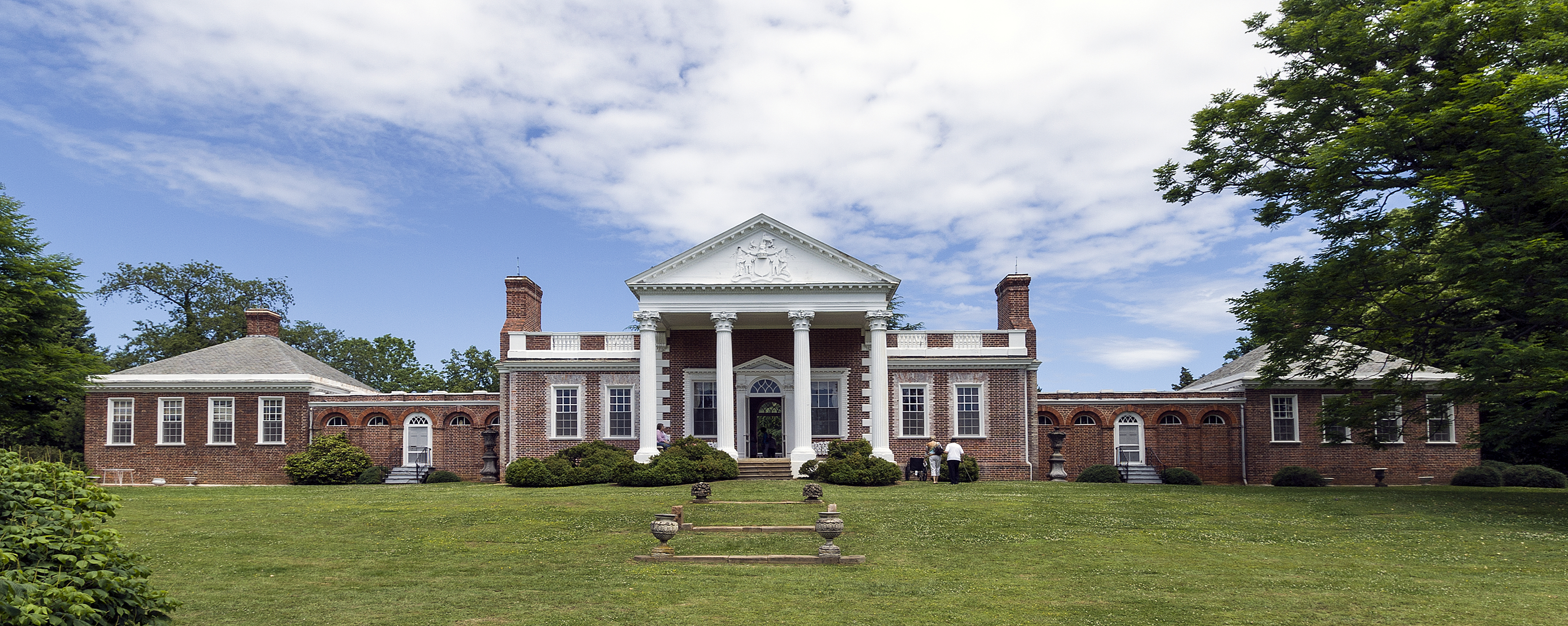
South elevation of Whitehall

Whitehall was designated a National Historic Landmark in 1960. It was listed on the National Register of Historic Places in 1966.

Whitehall has been nominated as one of the components of the proposed Chesapeake National Recreation Area in legislation introduced in Congress in 2022.

== See also ==
- Tulip Hill
- Palace of Whitehall
- White's Hall

== Sources ==
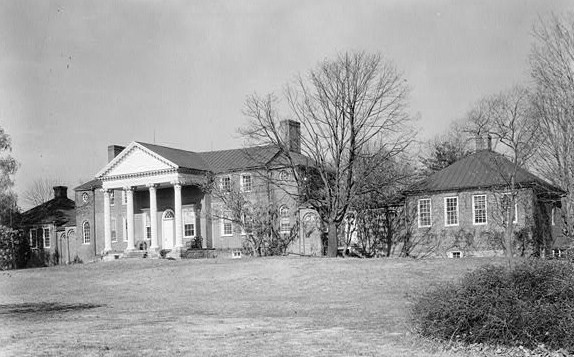
Whitehall in 1936 with second story, later removed in restoration work

- Swann Jr., Don (1975). Colonial and Historic Homes of Maryland. Baltimore and London: Johns Hopkins University Press. p. 212. ISBN 0-8018-1727-7.
