= Joseph Horatio Anderson =

American architect

- Died: before 1778; Annapolis, Maryland
- Occupation: Architect
- Buildings: Maryland State House

Joseph Horatio Anderson was a British-born Colonial American architect active in Annapolis, Province of Maryland, in the late 18th century.

He designed Whitehall (1764), a plantation house in Anne Arundel County, outside Annapolis. He was the likely designer of the third (and current) Maryland State House (1772). He designed the second St. Anne's Church (designed 1775, completed 1792), also in Annapolis, although the church was not completed until more than a decade after his death.

Quite few details are known of Anderson's life.

Though Anderson boasted he was "regularly bread to those Sciences architectural design and construction & the only one upon the Continant [sic]," his octagonal design for the dome of the Maryland State House was found to be "contrary to all rules of architecture," and later replaced.

In 1770, Anderson sent a letter to Rhode Island College offering his architectural services to the newly established institution. The correspondence, however, arrived only after construction on the college's new building had already begun.

== Gallery ==
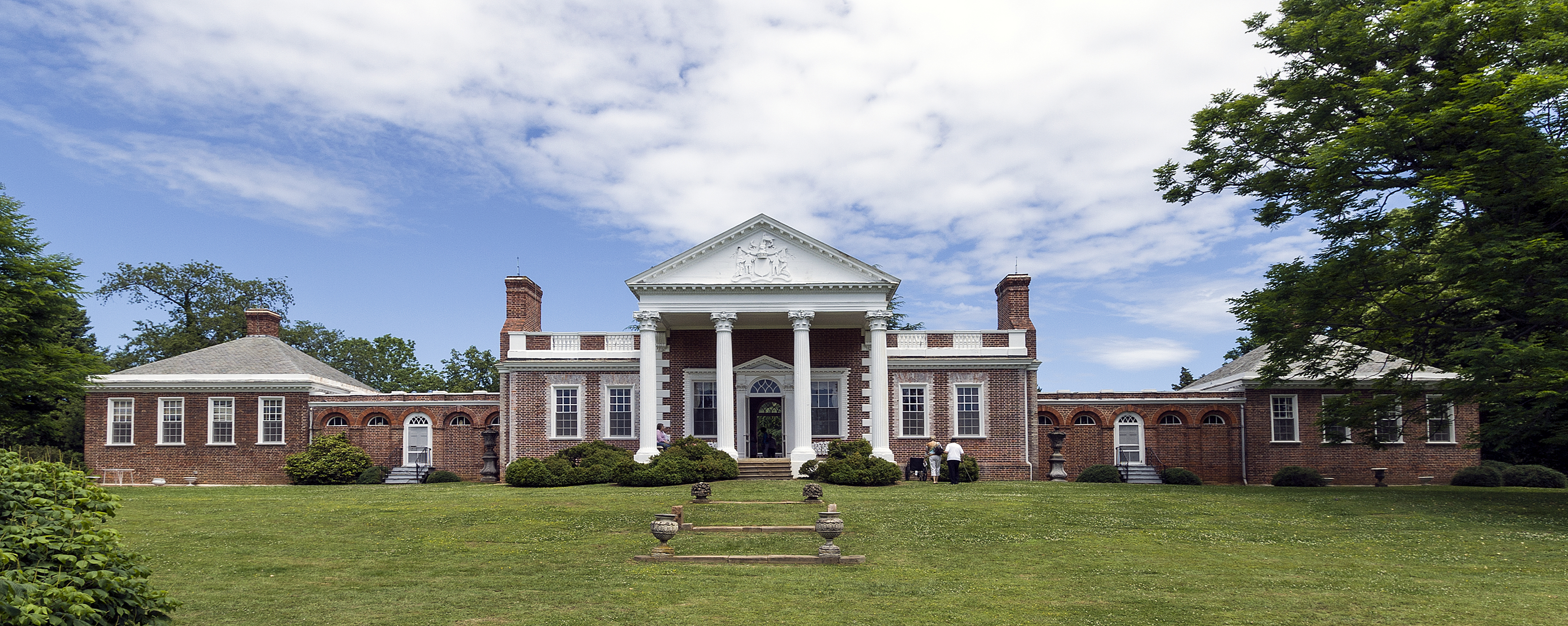
Whitehall (1764), Anne Arundel County

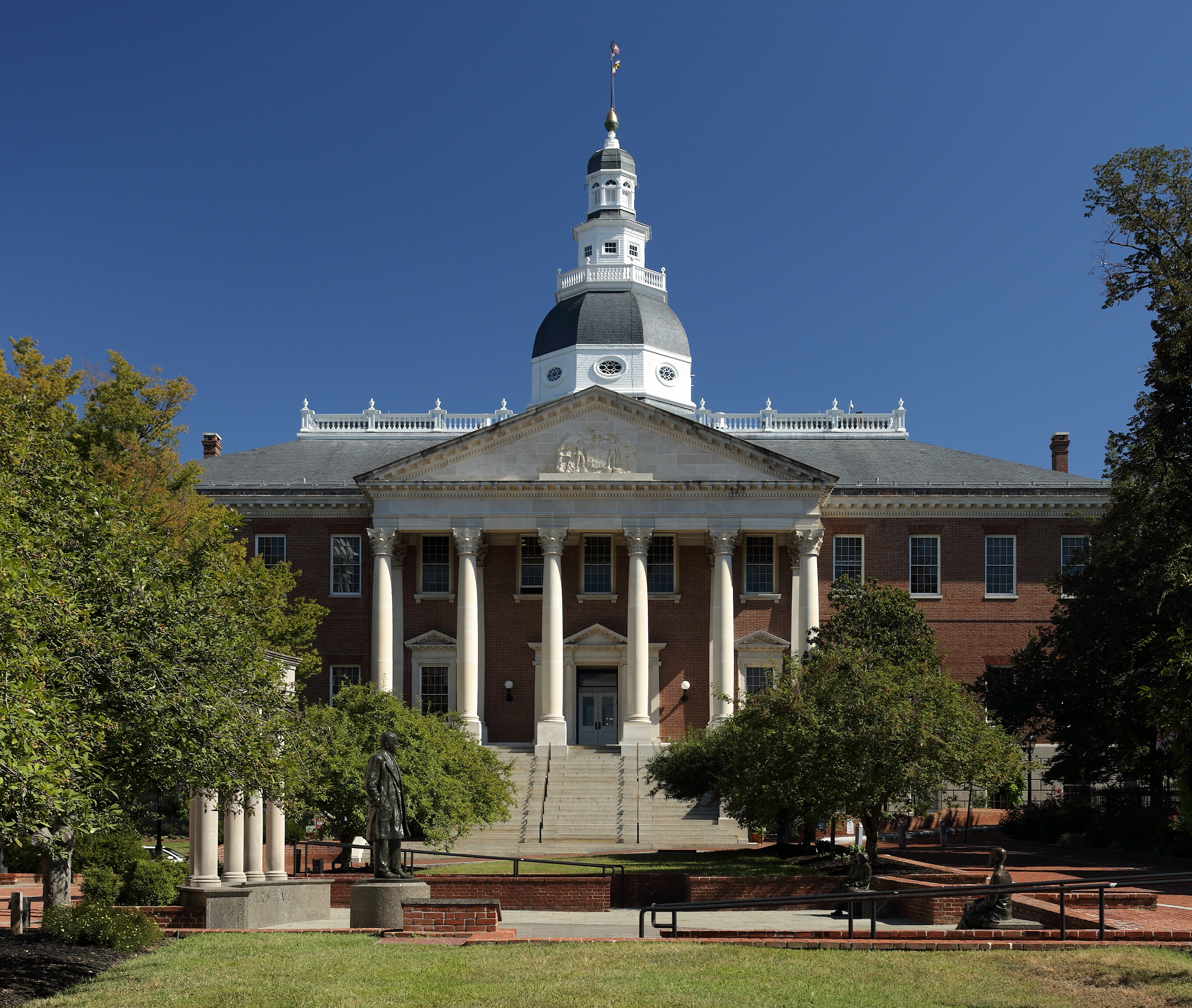
Maryland State House (1772), Annapolis

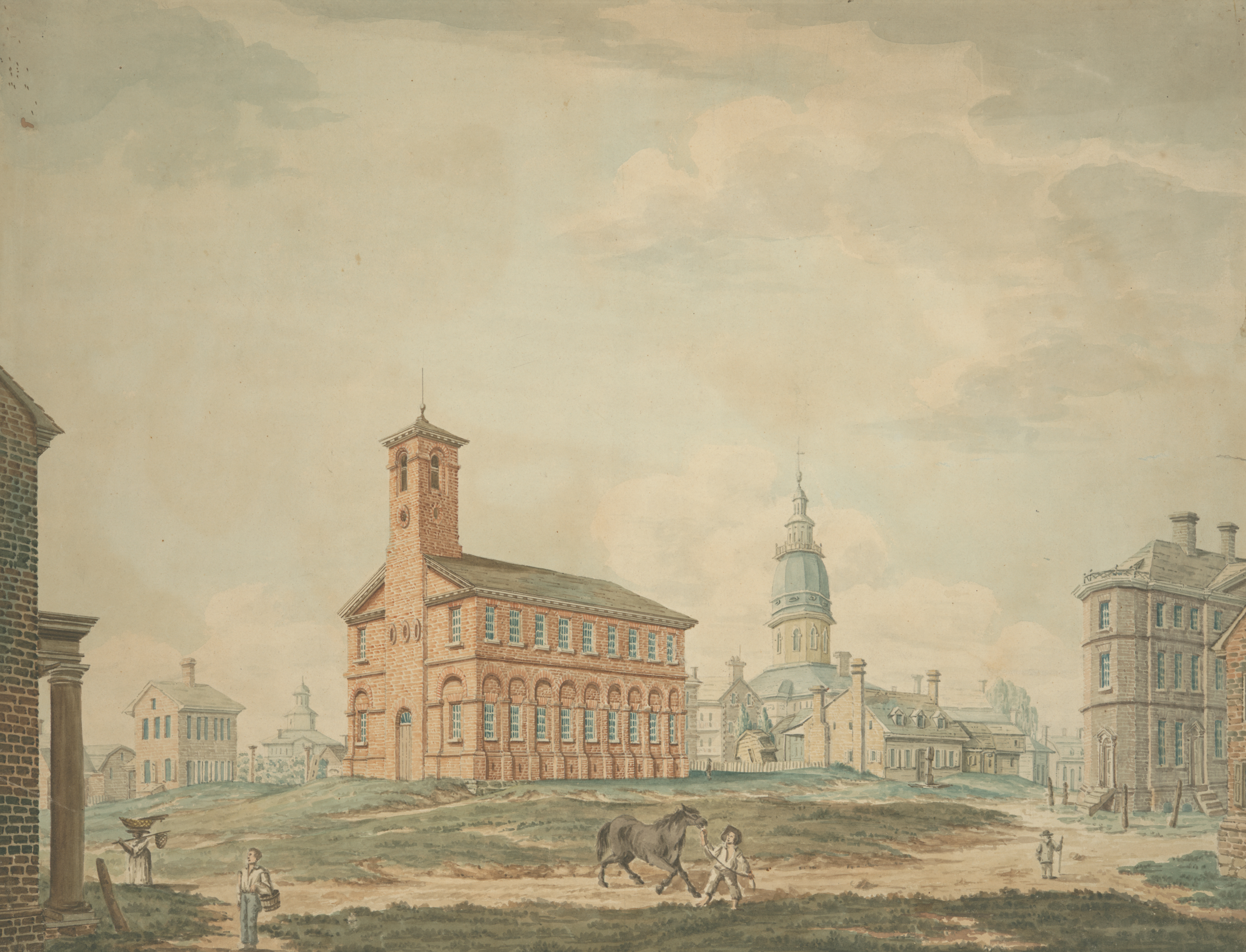
Second St. Anne's Church (designed 1775, completed 1792), Annapolis
