= January 14 =

January 14 this year in various calendars
- Wednesday, 14 January 2026
Akan	Kuruwukuo
Armenian	28 Arach 1475
Aztec	Toxcatl 4, 5 Malīnalli
Babylonian	24 Kislimu, 2336 SE
Balinese pawukon	Menga, Pasah, Menala, Umanis, Paniron, Buda of Tambir, Uma, Dangu, Suka
Bengali	30 Poush, BS 1432
Chinese	Yang Earth Rat・Winnowing Basket Mansion; Wood Snake Year, Month 11, Day 26 (Xiaohan, 6 days until Dahan)
Common Era	14 January 2026 CE
Coptic	6 Tobi, AM 1742
Egyptian	3 Payni, 2774 NE
Ethiopian	6 Ṭer, 2018 Amätä Məhrät
French Republican	Décade III, Quintidi de Nivôse de l'Année 234 de la République
Gregorian	14 January, AD 2026
Hebrew	25 Tevet, AM 5786
Hindu	Anurādhā・Gaṇḍa; Solar: 1 Māgha, 1947 SE; Lunisolar: Ekādaśī, Kṛishna pakṣa of Pauṣa, 2082 VE; Siddhārthin・5126 KY・1,872,589
Icelandic	Miðvikudagur, 22 Mörsugur 2025
Islamic	25 Rajab, AH 1447 (using tabular method)
ISO week date	2026-W03-3
Japanese	26 Shimotsuki, Reiwa 8 (Shōkan, 6 days until Daikan)
Julian	1 January, AD 2026 (AM 7534)
Julian day	2461055
Korean	26 Jwidal, 4358 DE
Maya	13.0.13.4.12; 10 Muan, 5 Eb
Roman	Kalendis Ianuariis, MMDCCLXXIX AUC
Solar Hijri	24 Dey, SH 1404
Tibetan	26 mgo, shing mo sbrul 2152 or 1771 or 999

<<	January					>>
Su	Mo	Tu	We	Th	Fr	Sa
				1	2	3
4	5	6	7	8	9	10
11	12	13	14	15	16	17
18	19	20	21	22	23	24
25	26	27	28	29	30	31
2026

January 14 in recent years
2026 (Wednesday)
2025 (Tuesday)
2024 (Sunday)
2023 (Saturday)
2022 (Friday)
2021 (Thursday)
2020 (Tuesday)
2019 (Monday)
2018 (Sunday)
2017 (Saturday)

January 14 is the 14th day of the year in the Gregorian calendar; 351 days remain until the end of the year (352 in leap years).

== Events ==
=== Pre-1600 ===
- 1236 – King Henry III of England marries Eleanor of Provence.
- 1301 – Andrew III of Hungary dies, ending the Árpád dynasty in Hungary.

=== 1601–1900 ===
- 1761 – The Third Battle of Panipat, the largest battle of the 18th century, is fought in India between the Afghan Durrani Empire under Ahmad Shah Durrani, and the Maratha Empire under Sadashivrao Bhau.
- 1784 – American Revolutionary War: Ratification Day, United States: Congress ratifies the Treaty of Paris with Great Britain.
- 1797 – The Battle of Rivoli is fought with a decisive French victory by Napoleon Bonaparte, marking the beginning of the end of the War of the First Coalition and the start of French hegemony over Italy for two decades.
- 1814 – Treaty of Kiel: Frederick VI of Denmark cedes the Kingdom of Norway to Charles XIII of Sweden in return for Pomerania.
- 1858 – Napoleon III of France escapes an assassination attempt made by Felice Orsini and his accomplices in Paris.
- 1899 – RMS Oceanic, the largest ship afloat since SS Great Eastern, is launched.
- 1900 – Giacomo Puccini's Tosca opens in Rome.

=== 1901–present ===
- 1907 – An earthquake in Kingston, Jamaica kills more than 1,000 people.
- 1911 – Roald Amundsen's South Pole expedition makes landfall on the eastern edge of the Ross Ice Shelf.
- 1939 – Norway claims Queen Maud Land in Antarctica.
- 1943 – World War II: Japan begins Operation Ke, the successful operation to evacuate its forces from Guadalcanal during the Guadalcanal campaign.
- 1943 – World War II: Franklin D. Roosevelt and Winston Churchill begin the Casablanca Conference to discuss strategy and study the next phase of the war.
- 1951 – National Airlines Flight 83 crashes during landing at Philadelphia International Airport, killing seven passengers and crew.
- 1952 – NBC's long-running morning news program Today debuts, with host Dave Garroway.
- 1953 – Josip Broz Tito is elected the first President of Yugoslavia.
- 1954 – The Hudson Motor Car Company merges with Nash-Kelvinator Corporation forming the American Motors Corporation.
- 1957 – Kripalu Maharaj is named fifth Jagadguru (world teacher) after giving seven days of speeches before 500 Hindu scholars.
- 1960 – The Reserve Bank of Australia, the country's central bank and banknote issuing authority authorized by the 1959 Reserve Bank Act, is established.
- 1967 – Counterculture of the 1960s: The Human Be-In takes place in San Francisco, California's Golden Gate Park, launching the Summer of Love.
- 1969 – USS Enterprise fire: An accidental explosion aboard the USS Enterprise near Hawaii kills 28 people.
- 1972 – Queen Margrethe II of Denmark ascends the throne, the first Queen of Denmark since 1412 and the first Danish monarch not named Frederik or Christian since 1513.
- 1973 – Elvis Presley's concert Aloha from Hawaii is broadcast live via satellite, and sets the record as the most watched broadcast by an individual entertainer in television history.
- 1993 – Sinking of the MS Jan Heweliusz: In Poland's worst peacetime maritime disaster, ferry MS Jan Heweliusz sinks off the coast of Rügen, drowning 55 passengers.
- 2010 – Yemen declares an open war against the terrorist group al-Qaeda.
- 2016 – Multiple explosions reported near the Sarinah Building, Jakarta, followed by shootout between perpetrators and the police, killing seven people. The Islamic State of Iraq and the Levant claimed responsibility.
- 2019 – A Saha Airlines Boeing 707 crashes at Fath Air Base near Karaj in Alborz Province, Iran, killing 15 people.
- 2024 – Queen Margrethe II abdicates as Queen of Denmark and is succeeded by her son, Frederik X.
- 2026 – Thirty-two people are killed when a crane falls onto a passenger train in Sikhio district, Thailand.

== Births ==
=== Pre-1600 ===
- 83 BC – Mark Antony, Roman general and politician (died 30 BC)
- 1131 – Valdemar I of Denmark (died 1182)
- 1273 – Joan I of Navarre, queen regnant of Navarre, queen consort of France (died 1305)
- 1451 – Franchinus Gaffurius, Italian composer and theorist (died 1522)
- 1477 – Hermann of Wied, German archbishop (died 1552)
- 1476 – Anne St Leger, Baroness de Ros, English baroness (died 1526)
- 1507 – Catherine of Austria, Queen of Portugal (died 1578)
- 1507 – Luca Longhi, Italian painter (died 1580)
- 1551 – Abu'l-Fazl ibn Mubarak, Grand vizier of emperor Akbar (died 1602)
- 1552 – Alberico Gentili, Italian-English academic and jurist (died 1608)

=== 1601–1900 ===
- 1683 – Gottfried Silbermann, German instrument maker (died 1753)
- 1684 – Johann Matthias Hase, German mathematician, astronomer, and cartographer (died 1742)
- 1684 – Jean-Baptiste van Loo, French painter (died 1745)
- 1699 – Jakob Adlung, German organist, historian, and theorist (died 1762)
- 1700 – Picander, German poet and playwright (died 1764)
- 1702 – Emperor Nakamikado of Japan (died 1737)
- 1705 – Jean-Baptiste Charles Bouvet de Lozier, French sailor, explorer, and politician (died 1786)
- 1741 – Benedict Arnold, American-British general (died 1801)
- 1749 – James Garrard, American farmer, Baptist minister and politician (died 1822)
- 1767 – Maria Theresa of Austria (died 1827)
- 1780 – Henry Baldwin, American judge and politician (died 1844)
- 1792 – Christian de Meza, Danish general (died 1865)
- 1793 – John C. Clark, American lawyer and politician (died 1852)
- 1798 – Johan Rudolph Thorbecke, Dutch historian, jurist, and politician, 3rd Prime Minister of the Netherlands (died 1872)
- 1800 – Ludwig Ritter von Köchel, Austrian composer, botanist, and publisher (died 1877)
- 1806 – Charles Hotham, English-Australian soldier and politician, 1st Governor of Victoria (died 1855)
- 1806 – Matthew Fontaine Maury, American astronomer, oceanographer, and historian (died 1873)
- 1818 – Zachris Topelius, Finnish author and journalist (died 1898)
- 1819 – Dimitrie Bolintineanu, Romanian poet and politician (died 1872)
- 1820 – Bezalel HaKohen, Russian rabbi (died 1878)
- 1824 – Vladimir Stasov, Russian critic (died 1906)
- 1834 – Duncan Gillies, Scottish-Australian politician, 14th Premier of Victoria (died 1903)
- 1836 – Henri Fantin-Latour, French painter and lithographer (died 1904)
- 1841 – Berthe Morisot, French painter (died 1895)
- 1845 – Henry Petty-Fitzmaurice, 5th Marquess of Lansdowne, English politician, 34th Governor-General of India (died 1927)
- 1849 – Frank Cowper, English yachtsman, author and illustrator (died 1930)
- 1850 – Pierre Loti, French captain and author (died 1923)
- 1856 – J. F. Archibald, Australian journalist and publisher, co-founded The Bulletin (died 1919)
- 1861 – Mehmed VI, Ottoman sultan (died 1926)
- 1862 – Carrie Derick, Canadian botanist and geneticist (died 1941)
- 1863 – Manuel de Oliveira Gomes da Costa, Portuguese general and politician, 10th President of Portugal (died 1929)
- 1863 – Richard F. Outcault, American author and illustrator (died 1928)
- 1869 – Robert Fournier-Sarlovèze, French polo player and politician (died 1937)
- 1870 – George Pearce, Australian carpenter and politician (died 1952)
- 1875 – Albert Schweitzer, French-German physician and philosopher, Nobel Prize laureate (died 1965)
- 1882 – Hendrik Willem van Loon, Dutch-American historian and journalist (died 1944)
- 1883 – Nina Ricci, Italian-French fashion designer (died 1970)
- 1886 – Hugh Lofting, English author and poet, created Doctor Dolittle (died 1947)
- 1887 – Hugo Steinhaus, Polish mathematician and academic (died 1972)
- 1892 – Martin Niemöller, German pastor and theologian (died 1984)
- 1892 – Hal Roach, American actor, director, and producer (died 1992)
- 1892 – George Wilson, English footballer (died 1961)
- 1894 – Ecaterina Teodoroiu, Romanian soldier and nurse (died 1917)
- 1896 – John Dos Passos, American novelist, poet, and playwright (died 1970)
- 1897 – Hasso von Manteuffel, German general and politician (died 1978)
- 1899 – Carlos P. Romulo, Filipino soldier and politician, President of the United Nations General Assembly (died 1985)

=== 1901–present ===
- 1901 – Bebe Daniels, American actress (died 1971)
- 1901 – Alfred Tarski, Polish-American mathematician and philosopher (died 1983)
- 1904 – Cecil Beaton, English photographer, painter, and costume designer (died 1980)
- 1904 – Emily Hahn, American journalist and author (died 1997)
- 1904 – Babe Siebert, Canadian ice hockey player and coach (died 1939)
- 1905 – Mildred Albert, American fashion commentator, TV and radio personality, and fashion show producer (died 1991)
- 1905 – Takeo Fukuda, Japanese politician, 67th Prime Minister of Japan (died 1995)
- 1905 – Sterling Holloway, American actor (died 1992)
- 1906 – William Bendix, American actor (died 1964)
- 1907 – Georges-Émile Lapalme, Canadian lawyer and politician (died 1985)
- 1908 – Russ Columbo, American singer, violinist, and actor (died 1934)
- 1909 – Brenda Forbes, English-American actress (died 1996)
- 1909 – Joseph Losey, American director, producer, and screenwriter (died 1984)
- 1911 – Anatoly Rybakov, Russian-American author (died 1998)
- 1912 – Tillie Olsen, American short story writer (died 2007)
- 1914 – Harold Russell, Canadian-American soldier and actor (died 2002)
- 1914 – Selahattin Ülkümen, Turkish diplomat (died 2003)
- 1915 – Mark Goodson, American game show producer, created Family Feud and The Price Is Right (died 1992)
- 1919 – Giulio Andreotti, Italian journalist and politician, 41st Prime Minister of Italy (died 2013)
- 1919 – Andy Rooney, American soldier, journalist, critic, and television personality (died 2011)
- 1920 – Bertus de Harder, Dutch footballer and manager (died 1982)
- 1921 – Murray Bookchin, American author and philosopher (died 2006)
- 1921 – Kenneth Bulmer, American author (died 2005)
- 1921 – Ken Sailors, American basketball player (died 2016)
- 1922 – Hank Biasatti, Italian-Canadian baseball and basketball player (died 1996)
- 1922 – Diana Wellesley, Duchess of Wellington (died 2010)
- 1923 – Gerald Arpino, American dancer and choreographer (died 2008)
- 1923 – Fred Beckey, American mountaineer and author (died 2017)
- 1924 – Carole Cook, American actress and singer (died 2023)
- 1924 – Guy Williams, American actor (died 1989)
- 1925 – Jean-Claude Beton, Algerian-French engineer and businessman, founded Orangina (died 2013)
- 1925 – Moscelyne Larkin, American ballerina (died 2012)
- 1925 – Yukio Mishima, Japanese author, poet, and playwright (died 1970)
- 1926 – Frank Aletter, American actor (died 2009)
- 1926 – Warren Mitchell, English actor and screenwriter (died 2015)
- 1926 – Tom Tryon, American actor and author (died 1991)
- 1927 – Zuzana Růžičková, Czech harpsichord player (died 2017)
- 1928 – Lars Forssell, Swedish author, poet, and songwriter (died 2007)
- 1928 – Hans Kornberg, German-English biologist and academic (died 2019)
- 1928 – Garry Winogrand, American photographer and author (died 1984)
- 1929 – Peter Barkworth, English actor (died 2006)
- 1930 – Johnny Grande, American pianist and accordion player (died 2006)
- 1930 – Kenny Wheeler, Canadian-English trumpet player and composer (died 2014)
- 1931 – Frank Costigan, Australian lawyer and politician (died 2009)
- 1931 – Martin Holdgate, English biologist and academic
- 1931 – Caterina Valente, Italian-French singer and dancer (died 2024)
- 1932 – Don Garlits, American race car driver and engineer
- 1933 – Stan Brakhage, American director and producer (died 2003)
- 1934 – Richard Briers, English actor (died 2013)
- 1934 – Pierre Darmon, French tennis player
- 1934 – Alberto Rodríguez Larreta, Argentinian race car driver (died 1977)
- 1936 – Clarence Carter, American blues and soul singer-songwriter, musician, and record producer (died 2026)
- 1937 – J. Bernlef, Dutch author and poet (died 2012)
- 1937 – Ken Higgs, English cricketer and coach (died 2016)
- 1937 – Leo Kadanoff, American physicist and academic (died 2015)
- 1937 – Rao Gopal Rao, Indian actor, producer, and politician (died 1994)
- 1937 – Sonny Siebert, American baseball player
- 1937 – Billie Jo Spears, American country singer (died 2011)
- 1938 – Morihiro Hosokawa, Japanese journalist and politician, 79th Prime Minister of Japan
- 1938 – Jack Jones, American singer and actor (died 2024)
- 1938 – Allen Toussaint, American singer-songwriter, pianist, and producer (died 2015)
- 1939 – Kurt Moylan, Guamanian businessman and politician, 1st Lieutenant Governor of Guam
- 1940 – Julian Bond, American academic and politician (died 2015)
- 1940 – Ron Kostelnik, American football player (died 1993)
- 1940 – Siegmund Nimsgern, German opera singer (died 2025)
- 1940 – Trevor Nunn, English director and composer
- 1940 – Vasilka Stoeva, Bulgarian discus thrower
- 1941 – Nicholas Brooks, English historian (died 2014)
- 1941 – Faye Dunaway, American actress and producer
- 1941 – Gibby Gilbert, American golfer
- 1941 – Barry Jenner, American actor (died 2016)
- 1941 – Milan Kučan, Slovenian politician, 1st President of Slovenia
- 1942 – Dave Campbell, American baseball player and sportscaster
- 1942 – Gerben Karstens, Dutch cyclist (died 2022)
- 1943 – Angelo Bagnasco, Italian cardinal
- 1943 – Mariss Jansons, Latvian conductor (died 2019)
- 1943 – Shannon Lucid, American biochemist and astronaut
- 1943 – Holland Taylor, American actress and playwright
- 1944 – Marjoe Gortner, American actor and evangelist
- 1944 – Graham Marsh, Australian golfer and architect
- 1944 – Nina Totenberg, American journalist
- 1945 – Kathleen Chalfant, American actress
- 1945 – Maina Gielgud, English ballerina and director
- 1947 – Taylor Branch, American historian and author
- 1947 – Bev Perdue, American educator and politician, 73rd Governor of North Carolina
- 1947 – Bill Werbeniuk, Canadian snooker player (died 2003)
- 1948 – T Bone Burnett, American singer-songwriter, guitarist, and producer
- 1948 – Muhriz of Negeri Sembilan, Yamtuan Besar of Negeri Sembilan
- 1948 – Nasrollah Mardani, Iranian poet, (died 2004)
- 1948 – Carl Weathers, American football player and actor (died 2024)
- 1949 – Lawrence Kasdan, American director, producer, and screenwriter
- 1949 – Mary Robison, American short story writer and novelist
- 1949 – İlyas Salman, Turkish actor, director, and screenwriter
- 1949 – Lamar Williams, American bass player (died 1983)
- 1950 – Arthur Byron Cover, American author and screenwriter
- 1950 – Swen Nater, Dutch-American basketball player
- 1950 – Rambhadracharya, Indian religious leader, scholar, and author
- 1951 – Ron Behagen, American basketball player
- 1951 – O. Panneerselvam, Indian politician, 7th Chief Minister of Tamil Nadu
- 1952 – Sydney Biddle Barrows, American businesswoman and author
- 1952 – Maureen Dowd, American journalist and author
- 1952 – Konstantinos Iosifidis, Greek footballer and manager
- 1952 – Călin Popescu-Tăriceanu, Romanian engineer and politician, 60th Prime Minister of Romania
- 1953 – David Clary, English chemist and academic
- 1953 – Denzil Douglas, Caribbean educator and politician, 2nd Prime Minister of Saint Kitts and Nevis
- 1953 – Hans Westerhoff, Dutch biologist and academic
- 1954 – Jim Duggan, American professional wrestler
- 1956 – Étienne Daho, Algerian-French singer-songwriter and producer
- 1957 – Anchee Min, Chinese-American painter, photographer, and author
- 1959 – Geoff Tate, German-American singer-songwriter and musician
- 1961 – Rob Hall, New Zealand mountaineer (died 1996)
- 1963 – Steven Soderbergh, American director, producer, and screenwriter
- 1964 – Beverly Kinch, English long jumper and sprinter
- 1964 – Sergei Nemchinov, Russian ice hockey player
- 1964 – Shepard Smith, American television journalist
- 1965 – Marc Delissen, Dutch field hockey player, coach, and lawyer
- 1965 – Bob Essensa, Canadian ice hockey player and coach
- 1965 – Jemma Redgrave, English actress
- 1965 – Slick Rick, English-American rapper and producer
- 1966 – Terry Angus, English footballer
- 1966 – Marko Hietala, Finnish singer-songwriter, bass player, and producer
- 1966 – Nadia Maftouni, Iranian philosopher
- 1966 – Dan Schneider, American TV producer
- 1967 – Leonardo Ortolani, Italian author and illustrator, created Rat-Man
- 1967 – Emily Watson, English actress
- 1967 – Zakk Wylde, American guitarist and singer
- 1968 – Ruel Fox, English-Montserratian footballer, manager and chairman
- 1968 – LL Cool J, American rapper and actor
- 1969 – Jason Bateman, American actor, director, and producer
- 1969 – Martin Bicknell, English cricketer
- 1969 – Dave Grohl, American singer-songwriter, guitarist, and drummer
- 1971 – Lasse Kjus, Norwegian skier
- 1971 – Bert Konterman, Dutch footballer and manager
- 1971 – Antonios Nikopolidis, Greek footballer and manager
- 1972 – Kyle Brady, American football player and sportscaster
- 1972 – Dion Forster, South African minister, theologian, and author
- 1972 – James Key, English engineer
- 1973 – Giancarlo Fisichella, Italian race car driver
- 1973 – Paul Tisdale, English footballer and manager
- 1974 – Kevin Durand, Canadian actor
- 1974 – David Flitcroft, English footballer and manager
- 1975 – Georgina Cates, English actress
- 1975 – Jordan Ladd, American actress
- 1976 – Vincenzo Chianese, Italian footballer
- 1977 – Narain Karthikeyan, Indian race car driver
- 1977 – Terry Ryan, Canadian ice hockey player
- 1978 – Shawn Crawford, American sprinter
- 1979 – Karen Elson, English singer-songwriter, guitarist, and model
- 1979 – Evans Soligo, Italian footballer
- 1980 – Clive Clarke, Irish footballer
- 1980 – Cory Gibbs, American soccer player
- 1980 – Byron Leftwich, American football player and coach
- 1981 – Abdelmalek Cherrad, Algerian footballer
- 1981 – Jadranka Đokić, Croatian actress
- 1981 – Hyleas Fountain, American heptathlete
- 1981 – Concepción Montaner, Spanish long jumper
- 1982 – Marc Broussard, American singer-songwriter and guitarist
- 1982 – Zach Gilford, American actor
- 1982 – Léo Lima, Brazilian footballer
- 1982 – Thomas Longosiwa, Kenyan runner
- 1982 – Víctor Valdés, Spanish footballer
- 1983 – Cesare Bovo, Italian footballer
- 1983 – Vincent Jackson, American football player (died 2021)
- 1983 – Jason Krejza, Australian cricketer
- 1984 – Erick Aybar, American baseball player
- 1984 – Erika Matsuo, Japanese violinist
- 1984 – Mike Pelfrey, American baseball player
- 1985 – Aaron Brooks, American basketball player
- 1985 – Jake Choi, American actor
- 1985 – Joel Rosario, Dominican-American jockey
- 1985 – Shawn Sawyer, Canadian figure skater
- 1986 – Yohan Cabaye, French footballer
- 1986 – Alessio Cossu, Italian footballer
- 1986 – Matt Riddle, American mixed martial artist and wrestler
- 1987 – Jess Fishlock, Welsh footballer
- 1987 – Atsushi Hashimoto, Japanese actor
- 1988 – Kacey Barnfield, English actress
- 1988 – Hakeem Nicks, American football player
- 1988 – Jack P. Shepherd, English actor
- 1989 – Frankie Bridge, English singer-songwriter and dancer
- 1989 – Emma Greenwell, American-English actress
- 1990 – Kacy Catanzaro, American athlete and wrestler
- 1990 – Lelisa Desisa, Ethiopian runner
- 1990 – Grant Gustin, American actor and singer
- 1990 – Áron Szilágyi, Hungarian fencer
- 1992 – Robbie Brady, Irish footballer
- 1992 – Chieh-Yu Hsu, American tennis player
- 1992 – Qiang Wang, Chinese tennis player
- 1993 – Daniel Bessa, Brazilian footballer
- 1993 – David Nwaba, American basketball player
- 1994 – Kai, South Korean singer, model, actor and dancer
- 1997 – Francesco Bagnaia, Italian motorcycle racer
- 1998 – Maddison Inglis, Australian tennis player
- 1999 – Declan Rice, English footballer
- 1999 – Emerson Royal, Brazilian footballer
- 1999 – D'Andre Swift, American football player
- 2000 – Jonathan David, Canadian soccer player
- 2001 – Cora Jade, American wrestler
- 2002 – JJ Peterka, German ice hockey player

== Deaths ==
=== Pre-1600 ===
- 378 – Chak Tok Ichʼaak I, ajaw of the Maya city of Tikal
- 769 – Cui Huan, chancellor of the Tang Dynasty
- 927 – Wang Yanhan, king of Min (Ten Kingdoms)
- 937 – Zhang Yanlang, Chinese official
- 973 – Ekkehard I, Frankish monk and poet
- 1092 – Vratislaus II of Bohemia
- 1163 – Ladislaus II of Hungary (born 1131)
- 1236 – Saint Sava, Serbian archbishop and saint (born 1175)
- 1301 – Andrew III of Hungary (born 1265)
- 1331 – Odoric of Pordenone, Italian priest and explorer (born 1286)
- 1465 – Thomas Beckington, English statesman and prelate
- 1476 – John de Mowbray, 4th Duke of Norfolk (born 1444)
- 1555 – Jacques Dubois, French anatomist (born 1478)

=== 1601–1900 ===
- 1640 – Thomas Coventry, 1st Baron Coventry, English lawyer, judge, and politician, Attorney General for England and Wales (born 1578)
- 1648 – Caspar Barlaeus, Dutch historian, poet, and theologian (born 1584)
- 1676 – Francesco Cavalli, Italian organist and composer (born 1602)
- 1679 – Jacques de Billy, French mathematician and academic (born 1602)
- 1701 – Tokugawa Mitsukuni, Japanese daimyō (born 1628)
- 1753 – George Berkeley, Anglo-Irish philosopher and author (born 1685)
- 1766 – Frederick V of Denmark (born 1723)
- 1776 – Edward Cornwallis, English general and politician, Governor of Gibraltar (born 1713)
- 1786 – Michael Arne, English organist and composer (born 1741)
- 1786 – Meshech Weare, American lawyer and politician, 1st Governor of New Hampshire (born 1713)
- 1823 – Athanasios Kanakaris, Greek politician (born 1760)
- 1825 – George Dance the Younger, English architect and surveyor (born 1741)
- 1833 – Seraphim of Sarov, Russian monk and saint (born 1759)
- 1867 – Jean-Auguste-Dominique Ingres, French painter and illustrator (born 1780)
- 1874 – Johann Philipp Reis, German physicist and academic, invented the Reis telephone (born 1834)
- 1883 – Napoléon Coste, French guitarist and composer (born 1806)
- 1888 – Stephen Heller, Hungarian pianist and composer (born 1813)
- 1889 – Ema Pukšec, Croatian soprano (born 1834)
- 1892 – Prince Albert Victor, Duke of Clarence and Avondale (born 1864)
- 1892 – Alexander J. Davis, American architect (born 1803)
- 1898 – Lewis Carroll, English novelist, poet, and mathematician (born 1832)

=== 1901–present ===
- 1901 – Mandell Creighton, English bishop and historian (born 1843)
- 1901 – Charles Hermite, French mathematician and theorist (born 1822)
- 1905 – Ernst Abbe, German physicist and engineer (born 1840)
- 1907 – Sir James Fergusson, 6th Baronet, Scottish soldier and politician, 6th Governor of New Zealand (born 1832)
- 1908 – Holger Drachmann, Danish poet and playwright (born 1846)
- 1915 – Richard Meux Benson, English priest and saint, founded the Society of St. John the Evangelist (born 1824)
- 1919 – Platon, Estonian bishop and saint (born 1869)
- 1920 – John Francis Dodge, American businessman, co-founded the Dodge Automobile Company (born 1864)
- 1926 – August Sedláček, Czech historian and author (born 1843)
- 1934 – Ioan Cantacuzino, Romanian physician and bacteriologist (born 1863)
- 1937 – Jaishankar Prasad, Indian poet, author, and playwright (born 1889)
- 1938 – Jaakko Mäki, Finnish politician (born 1878)
- 1942 – Porfirio Barba-Jacob, Colombian poet and author (born 1883)
- 1943 – Laura E. Richards, American author and poet (born 1850)
- 1944 – Mehmet Emin Yurdakul, Turkish author and politician (born 1869)
- 1947 – Gustave Mathieu, French illegalist anarchist, suspected of being one of Ravachol's main accomplices (born 1866)
- 1949 – Harry Stack Sullivan, American psychiatrist and psychoanalyst (born 1892)
- 1951 – Gregorios Xenopoulos, Greek author, journalist, and playwright (born 1867)
- 1952 – Artur Kapp, Estonian composer and conductor (born 1878)
- 1957 – Humphrey Bogart, American actor (born 1899)
- 1959 – Eivind Berggrav, Norwegian bishop and translator (born 1884)
- 1961 – Barry Fitzgerald, Irish actor (born 1888)
- 1965 – Jeanette MacDonald, American actress and singer (born 1903)
- 1966 – Sergei Korolev, Ukrainian-Russian engineer and academic (born 1906)
- 1968 – Dorothea Mackellar, Australian poet and author (born 1885)
- 1970 – William Feller, Croatian-American mathematician and academic (born 1906)
- 1970 – Asım Gündüz, Turkish general (born 1880)
- 1972 – Horst Assmy, German footballer (born 1933)
- 1972 – Frederik IX of Denmark (born 1899)
- 1976 – Abdul Razak Hussein, Malaysian lawyer and politician, 2nd Prime Minister of Malaysia (born 1922)
- 1977 – Anthony Eden, English soldier and politician, Prime Minister of the United Kingdom (born 1897)
- 1977 – Peter Finch, English-Australian actor (born 1916)
- 1977 – Anaïs Nin, French-American essayist and memoirist (born 1903)
- 1978 – Harold Abrahams, English sprinter, lawyer, and journalist (born 1899)
- 1978 – Kurt Gödel, Austrian-American mathematician and philosopher (born 1906)
- 1978 – Robert Heger, German conductor and composer (born 1886)
- 1978 – Blossom Rock, American actress (born 1895)
- 1980 – Robert Ardrey, American-South African author, playwright, and screenwriter (born 1908)
- 1981 – G. Lloyd Spencer, American lieutenant and politician (born 1893)
- 1984 – Ray Kroc, American businessman and philanthropist (born 1902)
- 1986 – Donna Reed, American actress (born 1921)
- 1987 – Turgut Demirağ, Turkish director, producer, and screenwriter (born 1921)
- 1987 – Douglas Sirk, German-Swiss director and screenwriter (born 1900)
- 1988 – Georgy Malenkov, Russian engineer and politician, 5th Premier of the Soviet Union (born 1902)
- 1991 – Gordon Bryant, Australian educator and politician (born 1914)
- 1995 – Alexander Gibson, Scottish conductor (born 1926)
- 1996 – Onno Tunç, Armenian-Turkish composer (born 1948)
- 1997 – Dollard Ménard, Canadian general (born 1913)
- 2000 – Leonard Weisgard, American author and illustrator (born 1916)
- 2004 – Uta Hagen, German-American actress (born 1919)
- 2004 – Ron O'Neal, American actor, director, and screenwriter (born 1937)
- 2005 – Charlotte MacLeod, Canadian-American author (born 1922)
- 2005 – Conroy Maddox, English painter and educator (born 1912)
- 2005 – Rudolph Moshammer, German fashion designer (born 1940)
- 2005 – Jesús Rafael Soto, Venezuelan sculptor and painter (born 1923)
- 2006 – Henri Colpi, French director and screenwriter (born 1921)
- 2006 – Jim Gary, American sculptor (born 1939)
- 2006 – Shelley Winters, American actress (born 1920)
- 2007 – Vassilis Photopoulos, Greek painter, director, and set designer (born 1934)
- 2008 – Judah Folkman, American physician, biologist, and academic (born 1933)
- 2009 – Jan Kaplický, Czech architect, designed the Selfridges Building (born 1937)
- 2009 – Ricardo Montalbán, Mexican actor (born 1920)
- 2010 – Antonio Fontán, Spanish journalist and academic (born 1923)
- 2011 – Georgia Carroll, American singer, model and actress (born 1919)
- 2012 – Txillardegi, Spanish linguist and politician (born 1929)
- 2012 – Dan Evins, American businessman, founded Cracker Barrel Old Country Store (born 1935)
- 2012 – Arfa Karim, Pakistani student and computer prodigy, youngest Microsoft Certified Professional in 2004 (born 1995)
- 2012 – Giampiero Moretti, Italian entrepreneur and race car driver (born 1940)
- 2012 – Rosy Varte, Armenian-French actress (born 1923)
- 2013 – Conrad Bain, Canadian-American actor (born 1923)
- 2014 – Jon Bing, Norwegian author, scholar, and academic (born 1944)
- 2014 – Juan Gelman, Argentinian poet and author (born 1930)
- 2014 – Flavio Testi, Italian composer and musicologist (born 1923)
- 2015 – Bob Boyd, American basketball player and coach (born 1930)
- 2015 – Zhang Wannian, Chinese general (born 1928)
- 2016 – René Angélil, Canadian music producer, talent manager, and singer (born 1942)
- 2016 – Alan Rickman, English actor (born 1946)
- 2017 – Zhou Youguang, Chinese sociologist, (born 1906)
- 2018 – Spanky Manikan, Filipino veteran actor (born 1942)
- 2018 – Cyrille Regis, French Guianan-English footballer (born 1958)
- 2021 – Joel Robert, Belgian motorcycle racer (born 1943)
- 2023 – Mukarram Jah, 8th Nizam of Hyderabad (born 1933)
- 2025 – Arthur Blessitt, American Christian preacher (born 1940)
- 2025 – Tony Slattery, British actor, comedian and television personality (born 1959)

== Holidays and observances ==
- Christian feast day:
  - Barba'shmin
  - Devasahayam Pillai (Catholic Church)
  - Divina Pastora (Barquisimeto)
  - Eivind Berggrav (Lutheran)
  - Felix of Nola
  - Macrina the Elder
  - Odoric of Pordenone
  - January 14 (Eastern Orthodox liturgics)
- Defender of the Motherland Day (Uzbekistan)
- Feast of the Ass (Medieval Christianity)
- Flag Day (Georgia)
- National Forest Conservation Day (Thailand)
- Old New Year, and its related observance:
  - Azhyrnykhua (Abkhazia)
  - Yennayer (Berbers)
- Ratification Day (United States)
- Sidereal winter solstice celebrations in South and Southeast Asian cultures; marking the transition of the Sun to Capricorn, and the first day of the six months Uttarayana period. (see April 14):
  - Magh Bihu (Assam)
  - Maghe Sankranti (Nepal)
  - Maghi (Punjab, Haryana, Himachal Pradesh)
  - Makar Sankranti (India)
  - The first day of Pongal (Tamil Nadu)
  - Uttarayan (Uttarakhand, Gujarat and Rajasthan)
- World Logic Day (UNESCO)

== Notes ==
In the 20th and 21st centuries the Julian calendar is 13 days behind the Gregorian calendar, thus January 14 is sometimes celebrated as New Year's Day (Old New Year) by religious groups who use the Julian calendar.
