= John Shaw (cabinetmaker) =

American cabinetmaker (1745–1829)

John Shaw (1745–1829) was the Annapolis cabinetmaker who built most of the furniture first used in both legislative chambers of the Maryland State House. He was considered the foremost cabinetmaker in Annapolis during the late 18th century and was the designer of two early American flags.

== Early years ==
Born in Scotland on April 25, 1745, John Shaw was the son of John and Mary Cassels Shaw. He is believed to have immigrated in 1763 to Annapolis, where he worked for cabinetmakers or joiners before he began working independently. Ledgers kept by James Brice, a wealthy planter, show that Shaw was working as a journeyman in 1768 at the age of 23. He worked for Brice in a variety of construction projects.

== Annapolis cabinetmaker ==
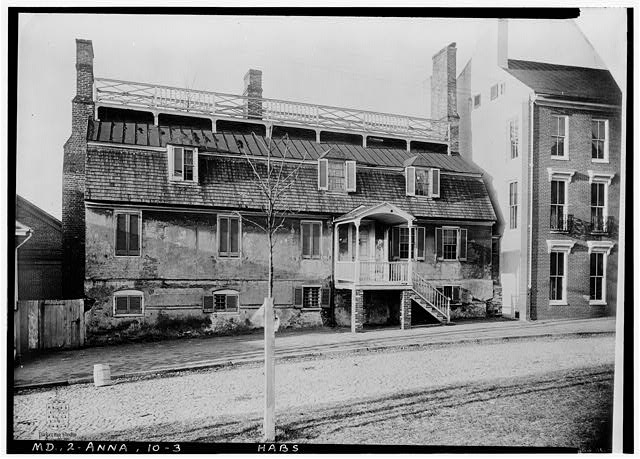
John Shaw's house at 21 State Circle, Annapolis

Shaw entered into a partnership with Archibald Chisholm, another Scottish cabinetmaker, in 1772. Together, they operated the largest cabinetmaking shop in Annapolis, until they ended the partnership to open their own, independent shops in 1776.

Modern critics have described John Shaw as foremost of the Annapolis cabinetmakers working during the Federal period (1780 to 1830), a craftsman who worked ""across the whole range of cabinetry, carpentry, and contracting". His cabinetry was described in the Winterthur Portfolio as "a conservative and visually agreeable meld of the Chippendale and federal styles". Examples of Shaw furniture currently exhibited at the Hammond-Harwood House Museum demonstrate the inlay work popular in the Federal era which he combined with early Chippendale style fretwork.

On May 24, 1784, Shaw purchased a house across the street from the Maryland State House. Located at 21 State Circle, the house was previously the shop and home of the butcher, Cornelius Brooksby, Jr. Brooksby's descendants sold the structure to Shaw.

=== Maryland State House ===
When construction of the Maryland State House was completed in 1779, Shaw began providing services for the building, eventually becoming its unofficial caretaker. John Shaw and craftsmen working for him built most of the furniture first used in both legislative chambers of the Maryland State House. However, he rush-ordered 72 chairs from Baltimore in November 1783 to assure enough seats would be available when Congress temporarily moved to Annapolis from 1783 to 1784.

The most significant work performed by Shaw's shop was a commission for 24 mahogany armchairs and 11 desks for the Maryland Senate in 1797. At this time, many of the pieces produced in the shop were built by Shaw's employees, William and Washington Tuck, who opened their own shop in 1807. When Shaw retired in 1820, Washington Tuck took over as caretaker for the State House.

John Shaw Flag (red first variation)

John Shaw Flag (white first variation)

=== John Shaw flags ===
To prepare for the period when Congress would meet in the Maryland State House, from November 26, 1783 to June 3, 1784, the Governor of Maryland commissioned John Shaw to create a U.S. flag. The flag was slightly different from other designs of the time, with the blue field extending over the entire height of the hoist. Shaw created two versions of the flag: one which started with a red stripe and another that started with a white stripe. One of the flags flew on the State House, while the other flew on the governor's house.

A replica of the John Shaw flag, copied from a 1794 watercolor by Charles Milbourne, now hangs in the rotunda of the Maryland State House.
