= Maryland State House =

State capitol building of Maryland, United States

- U.S. National Register of Historic Places
- U.S. National Historic Landmark
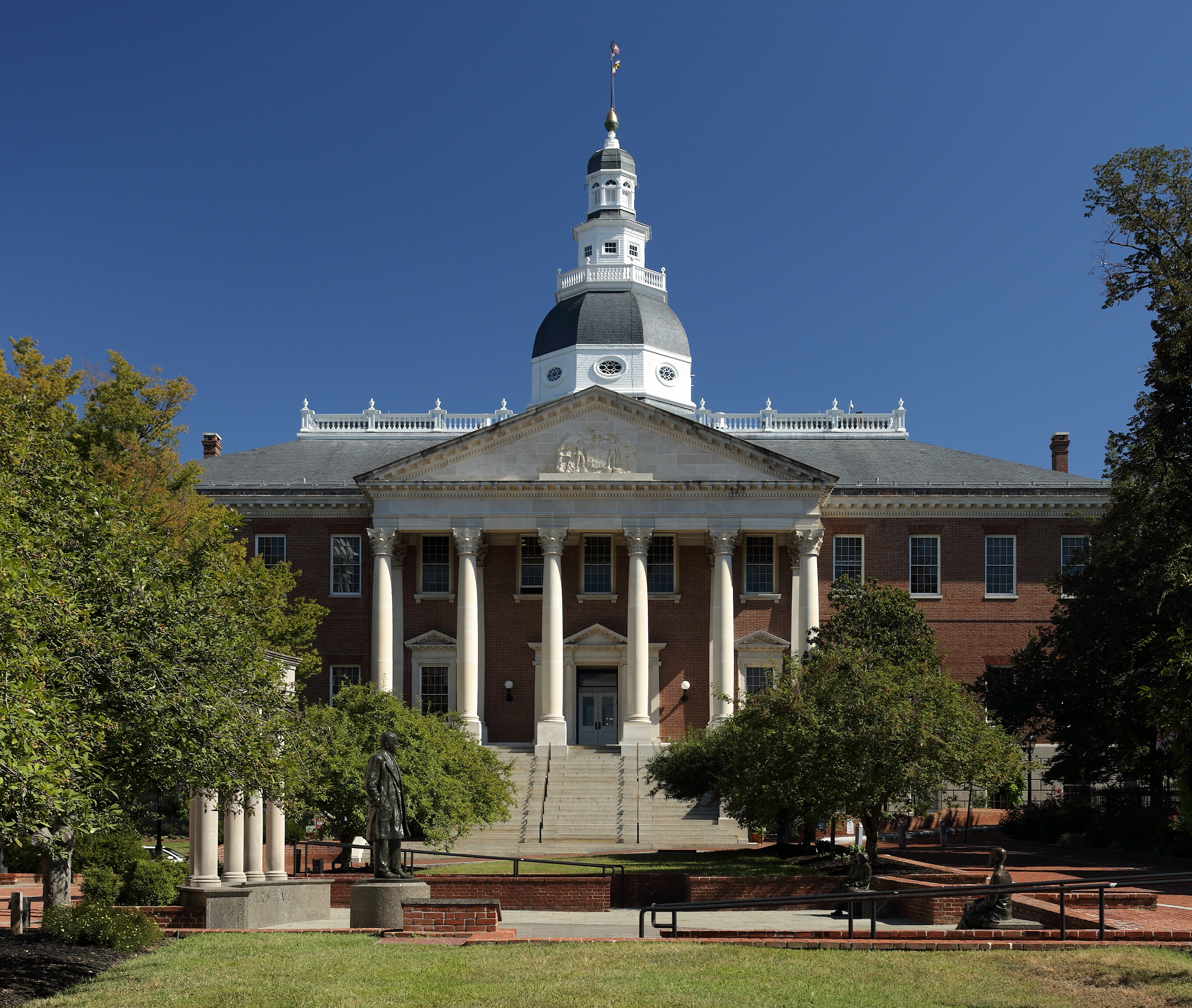
- Maryland State House in 2013
- Location: Annapolis, Maryland, U.S.
- Coordinates: 38°58′44″N 76°29′28″W
- Built: 1772; 254 years ago
- Architect: Joseph Horatio Anderson
- Architectural style: Georgian
- NRHP reference No.: 66000385

Significant dates
- Added to NRHP: October 15, 1966; 59 years ago
- Designated NHL: December 19, 1960; 65 years ago

The Maryland State House is located in Annapolis, Maryland. It is the oldest U.S. state capitol in continuous legislative use, dating to 1772, and houses the Maryland General Assembly, plus the offices of the governor and lieutenant governor. In 1783 and 1784 it served as the capitol building of the United States Congress of the Confederation, and is where Ratification Day, the formal end of the American Revolutionary War, occurred.

The capitol has the distinction of being topped by the largest wooden dome in the United States constructed without nails. The current building, which was designated a National Historic Landmark in 1960, is the third statehouse on its site. The building is administered by the State House Trust, established in 1969.

== Construction and history ==
Construction began in 1772, but was not completed until 1797 due to the ongoing American Revolutionary War. The two-story brick Georgian style structure, located inside State Circle, was designed by architect Joseph Horatio Anderson. A small portico juts out from the center of the building, topped by a pediment, with two high arched windows framing the entrance. On both floors, large rectangular windows line the facade. A cornice is topped by another pediment and the sloping roof gives way for a central octagonal drum atop which rests a dome. The large dome is topped by a balustraded balcony, another octagonal drum and a lantern capped by a lightning rod. The rod was constructed and grounded according to the direct specifications of its inventor, Benjamin Franklin.

The building was surrounded by a low brick wall in 1818 to prevent cattle incursions. This was replaced by an iron fence with a granite base in 1836. The dome of the statehouse is depicted on the Maryland state quarter.

An annex to the State House was constructed between 1902 and 1906 under the supervision of Baltimore architects Baldwin & Pennington; the new annex replaced earlier 19th-century annexes. The current state House of Delegates and Senate chambers are part of the annex, which is clad in black and gold Italian marble. The annex includes the Grand Staircase from the first to the second floors; above the staircase is the painting Washington Resigning His Commission by Edwin White, executed in 1858. In 2017, two additional paintings, both from the collection of the Enoch Pratt Free Library, were hung above the staircase. These additions were a portrait of Charles Calvert, 5th Baron Baltimore by Allan Ramsay (c. 1740) and a portrait of Frederick Calvert, 6th Baron Baltimore by Johann Ludwig Tietz (c. 1750).

In the mid-1990s, the cypress dome underwent a structural renovation and repainting. However, the latex paint that was used failed to bond due to preceding layers, causing it to flake. In 2011, the old paint was removed and replaced with white oil-based paint.

== Grounds ==
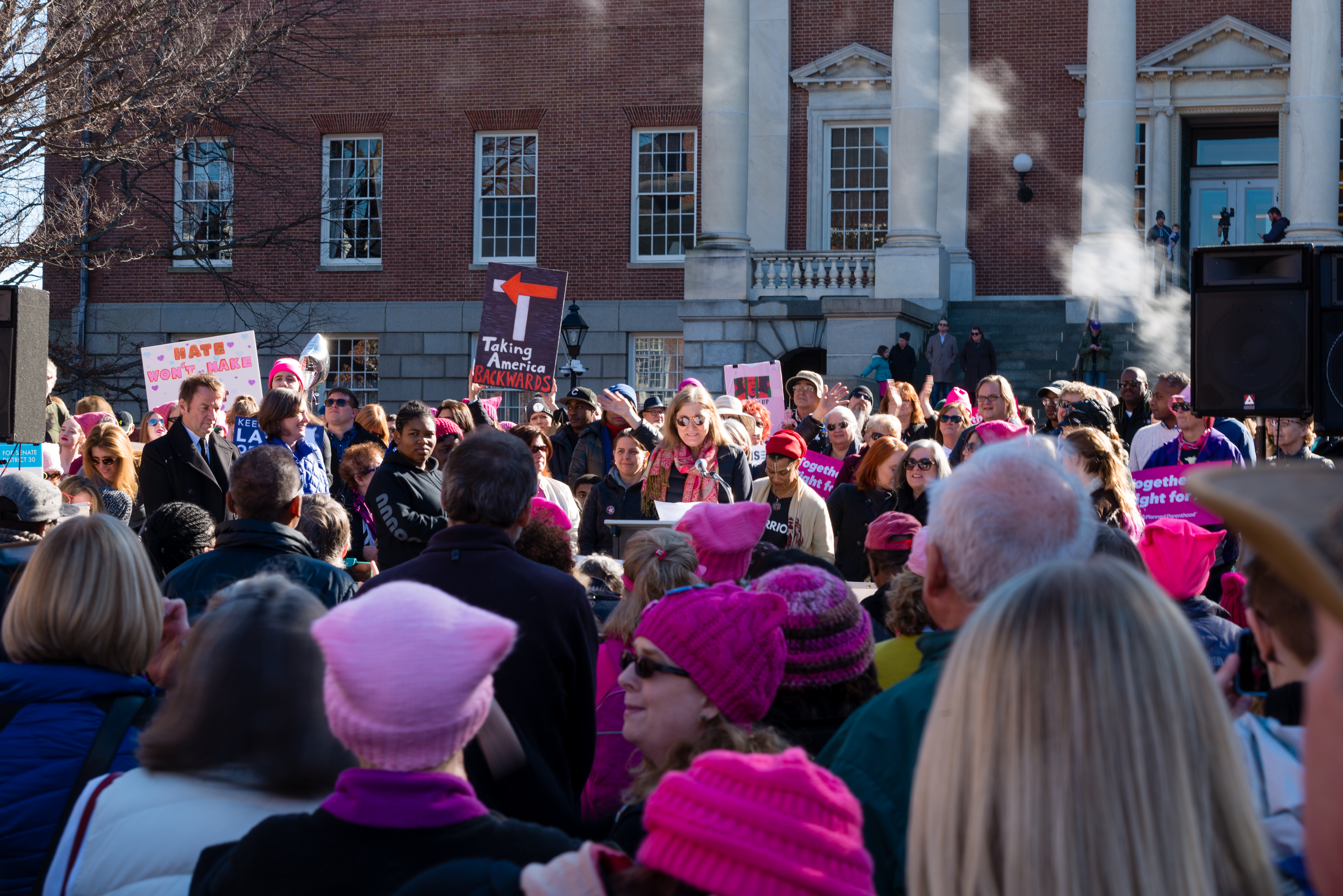
Women's March on January 20, 2018, on Lawyers Mall near the State House. Lawyers Mall is frequently used for protests and other gatherings.

Adjacent to the State House is Lawyers Mall, an open space which was designated in 1973 after the demolition of the Court of Appeals building, which had sat at the location since 1906. Statues of Baltimore native Thurgood Marshall, the first black U.S. Supreme Court justice, as well as Donald Gaines Murray, the first African-American to enter the University of Maryland School of Law since 1890, and a bench with statues of two anonymous children symbolizing the victory of Marshall's litigation in Brown v. Board of Education, all sit on Lawyers Mall. The space is the focal point of First Amendment activities on capitol grounds.

Until 2017, there was a statue of Roger B. Taney, Chief Justice of the United States, on the lawn of the State House. The statue was erected in 1872. The statue of Taney, a Marylander, was controversial because of Taney's support for slavery and his authorship of the U.S. Supreme Court decision in Dred Scott v. Sandford (1857), which upheld the denial of citizenship to African Americans. As a result, a movement in support of removing the statue emerged. At first, the State House Trust—made up of the governor, the speaker of the state house, the president of the state senate, and the chair of the Maryland Historical Trust Board of Trustees—responded by adding interpretive plaques "explaining the controversy over his divisive opinion and its place in the evolution of the nation's stance toward slavery." The Trust also added a statue of Marshall on Lawyers Mall, and agreed in 2016 to place statues of abolitionists Harriet Tubman and Frederick Douglass in the State House. In the wake of the Charlottesville car attack in 2017, House Speaker Michael E. Busch called for the removal of the Taney statue, as did Governor Larry Hogan a day later. It was removed just after midnight on August 18, 2017.

== Rotunda ==
The front entrance of the State House opens onto the Rotunda. Large Corinthian columns support the arches bracing the large dome above. A balustrade lines the second floor balcony. On the walls of the Rotunda are a number of commemorative plaques, including one commemorating Matthew Alexander Henson, co-discoverer of the North Pole.

In the summer of 2012, the original handwritten text of George Washington's resignation letter was on display in the rotunda. It was again put on display in March 2020 alongside the original Star-Spangled Banner by Francis Scott Key on loan from the Maryland Center for History and Culture.

== Chambers ==
=== Old Senate Chamber ===
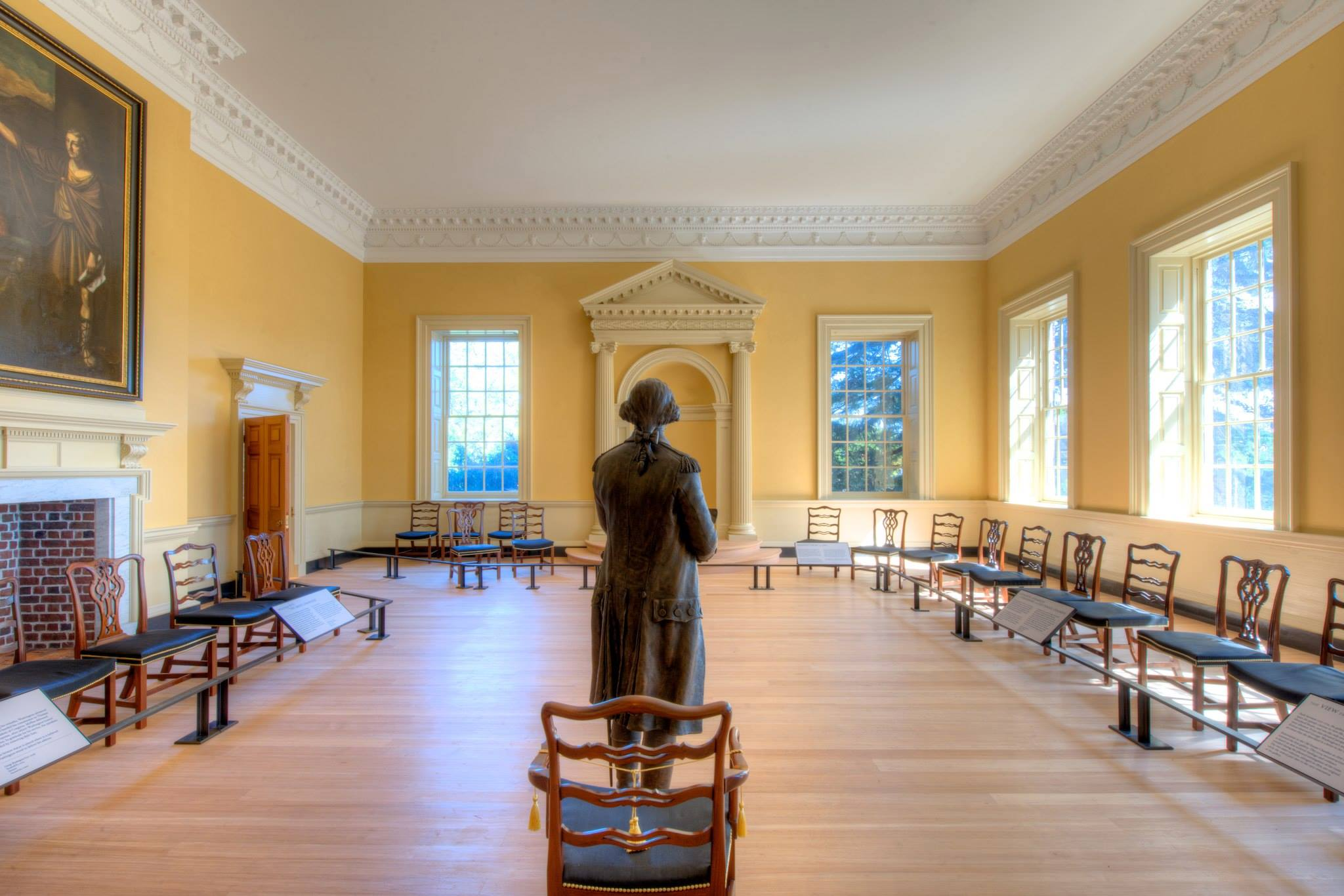
The Old Senate Chamber

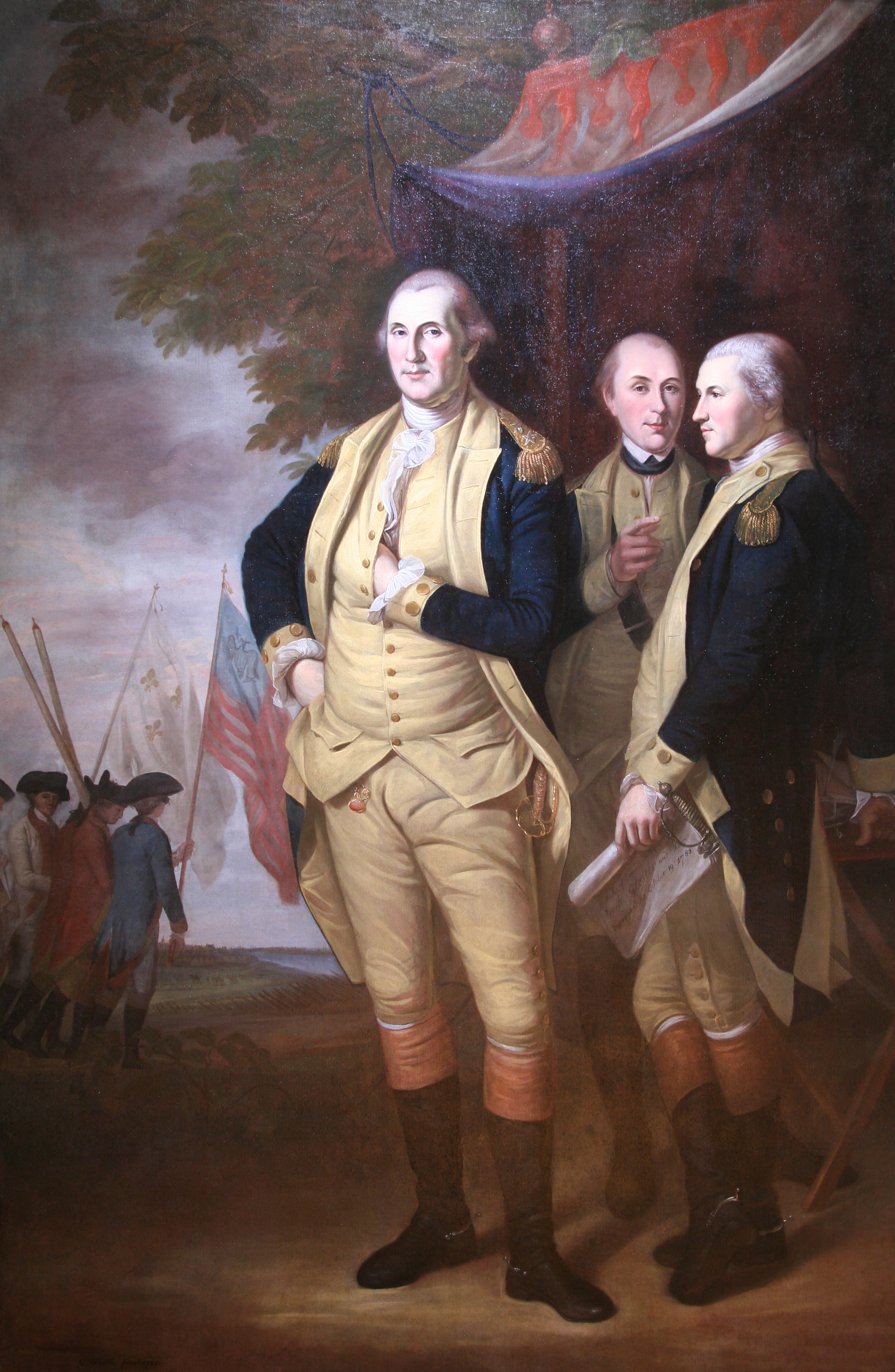
Washington, Lafayette & Tilghman at Yorktown, by Charles Willson Peale, 1784

To the right of the entrance is the old Senate Chamber. Chairs and desks were added to the room in the exact number (16) as originally furbished. The desk for the president is an original piece made by John Shaw in 1797. Above the fireplace is the painting Washington, Lafayette & Tilghman at Yorktown by Charles Willson Peale; the work was commissioned by the Maryland Legislature in 1783 and added to the State House collection the following year. The painting depicts General George Washington, Lafayette and Washington's aide-de-camp Tench Tilghman.

It was in the Old Senate Chamber that Washington resigned his commission as commander-in-chief of the Continental Army on December 23, 1783. A bronze statue of Washington stands in the room.

On February 2, 1781, Governor Thomas Sim Lee signed and sealed the "act to empower the delegates of this state in Congress to subscribe and ratify the Articles of Confederation." The decision established the requisite unanimous consent of all thirteen states for the formation of a Perpetual Union.

On September 11, 1786, the Annapolis Convention, an interstate convention to discuss ways to facilitate commerce between the states and the establishment standard rules and regulations, convened here. The convention laid the groundwork for the 1787 Constitutional Convention.

The chamber had extensive investigation beginning in 2007 to solve water leakage problems. As a result of this study, restorers have determined that previous restoration attempts in 1905 and 1940 did not accurately recreate many elements of the room. A report of their findings was issued in January 2010. The restoration work was completed in 2015 and the chamber reopened to the public.

=== Working Senate Chamber ===
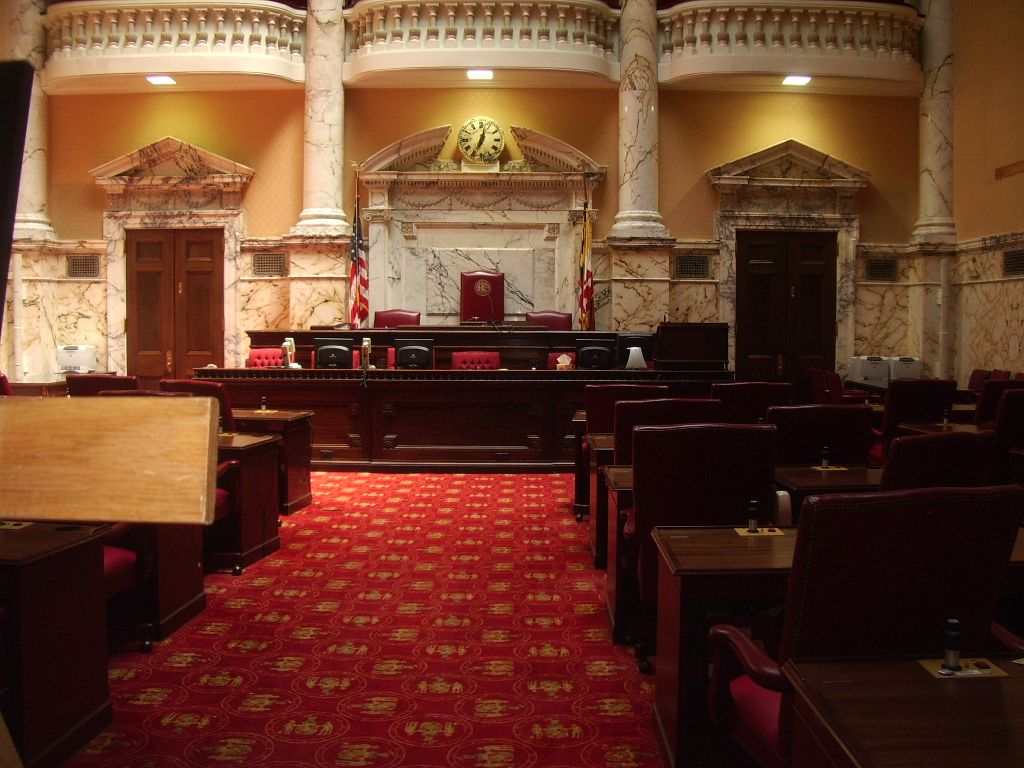
Chamber of the Maryland State Senate

The Senate chamber is located in a wing added to the original structure between 1902 and 1905. The room is illuminated by a Tiffany-style skylight above. Red carpet emblazoned with the state seal covers the entire floor. Large Ionic columns line the walls and support the viewing gallery. The marble along the walls and the columns are flecked with rust and black, Maryland's official colors.

Two famous Marylanders are featured in statues flanking the podium: John Hanson, the first president by the Articles of Confederation, and Charles Carroll, one of the signers of the Declaration of Independence. Four portraits of Declaration of Independence signatories for Maryland hang on the walls: William Paca, Thomas Stone, Samuel Chase, and Charles Carroll. Portraits of Thomas V. Mike Miller Jr. and Verda Welcome were installed on January 13, 2020, replacing the portraits of Edwin Warfield and John Walter Smith.

=== Working House Chamber ===
The House of Delegates chamber is also in the new wing to the building. The carpet is navy blue and designed with a diamond and olive sheaths. The same rust and black marble lines the chamber and forms the Ionic columns along the walls. A spectators' gallery is above the rostrum. The speaker sits in front of a broken marble pediment supporting a clock. Portraits of former Speakers of the House hang on the walls.

=== Governor's Reception Room ===
The Governor's Reception Room is on the second floor. The room is mainly ceremonial and used for bill signings. Portraits of former governors hang on the walls. Portraits of Henrietta Maria and Queen Anne hang nearby. The room was originally used as the Council Chamber for Maryland's executive council, which was abolished in state constitutional reforms in 1838; it became known as the Governor's Reception Room in the 1860s.

=== State House Caucus Room ===
What is now known as the State House Caucus Room was originally divided into two rooms housing the records of the Land Office and the General Court (which later became Court of Appeals of Maryland). After the Old House of Delegates Chamber was expanded in 1858, the room was divided between the private office of the speaker of the House of Delegates (rear half) and a cloakroom (front half). In 1905–06, the room was likely renovated, and became known as the Flag Room, which housed various Civil War battle flags and ceremonial weapons. The room was later used by the Department of Legislative Reference and became known as the "Bill Room" by the 1940s. From the early 1980s until 2008, the room was used as the Maryland State House Visitor Center. In 2011, the room was renamed the State House Caucus Room, and is now used for meetings.

The Caucus Room houses most of the 48-piece silver service from the armored cruiser USS Maryland, which was decommissioned in 1947. The pieces in the set show 167 scenes from Maryland history, with each piece focusing on one of Maryland's 23 counties and Baltimore. The silver was transferred from the Maryland Historical Society to the State House in 1962. In 1992, four pieces from the service were given to the submarine USS Maryland. In addition to the silver, the Caucus Room contains a 19th-century bust of Reverdy Johnson.

Paintings in the Caucus Room include both portraits and landscapes. Portraits in the room are originals depicting Oden Bowie (by Katherine Walton), Frank Brown (by Louis P. Dieterich), Leonard Calvert (attributed to Jacob van Oost or Jacob van Oost the Younger), Elihu Emory Jackson (by Ida Foster), Robert M. McLane (by George Peter Alexander Healy), Thomas Swann (by Florence Mackubin), Francis Thomas (by Franklin Barber Clark), William Pinkney Whyte (by David Bendann), and Levin Winder (by Florence Mackubin). The room also contains reproductions of portraits of Clarence W. Blount (by Simmie Knox) and Mary Eliza Watters Risteau (by Talmadge of New York).

== National capital ==
From November 26, 1783, to August 13, 1784, Annapolis was the capital of the United States. The Congress of the Confederation met in the Maryland State House. Subsequently, Annapolis was a candidate to become the new permanent national capital before Washington, D.C., was built.

It was in the Old Senate Chamber that Congress ratified the Treaty of Paris on January 14, 1784, formally ending the American Revolutionary War.

== United States district court ==
The United States District Court for the District of Maryland met there for the first decade of its existence. In 1800, judge Samuel Chase tried a local postmaster for embezzlement and sentenced him to thirty-nine lashes. To execute the sentence, the defendant was tied to one of the statehouse columns.

== Photo gallery ==
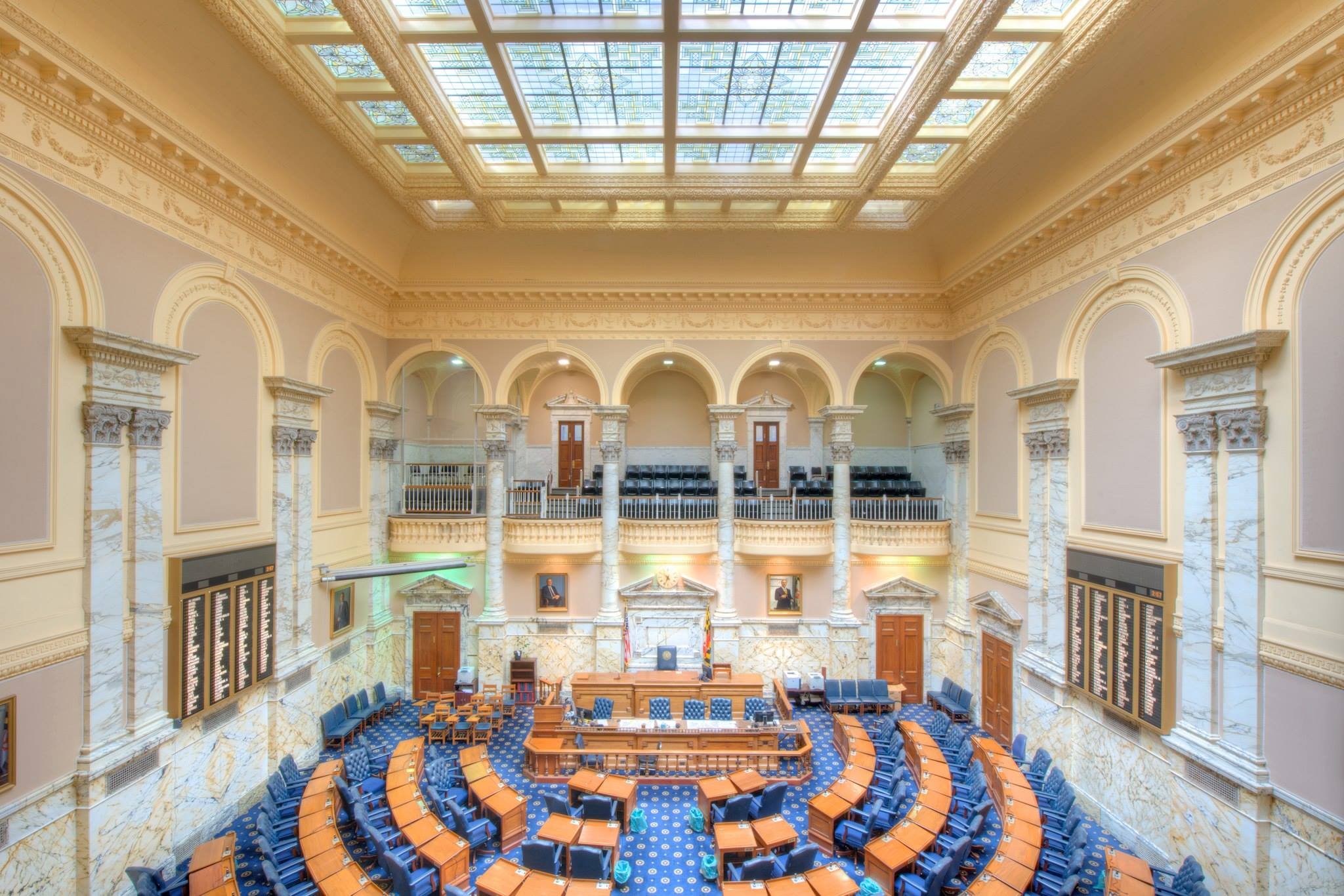
Chamber of the Maryland House of Delegates

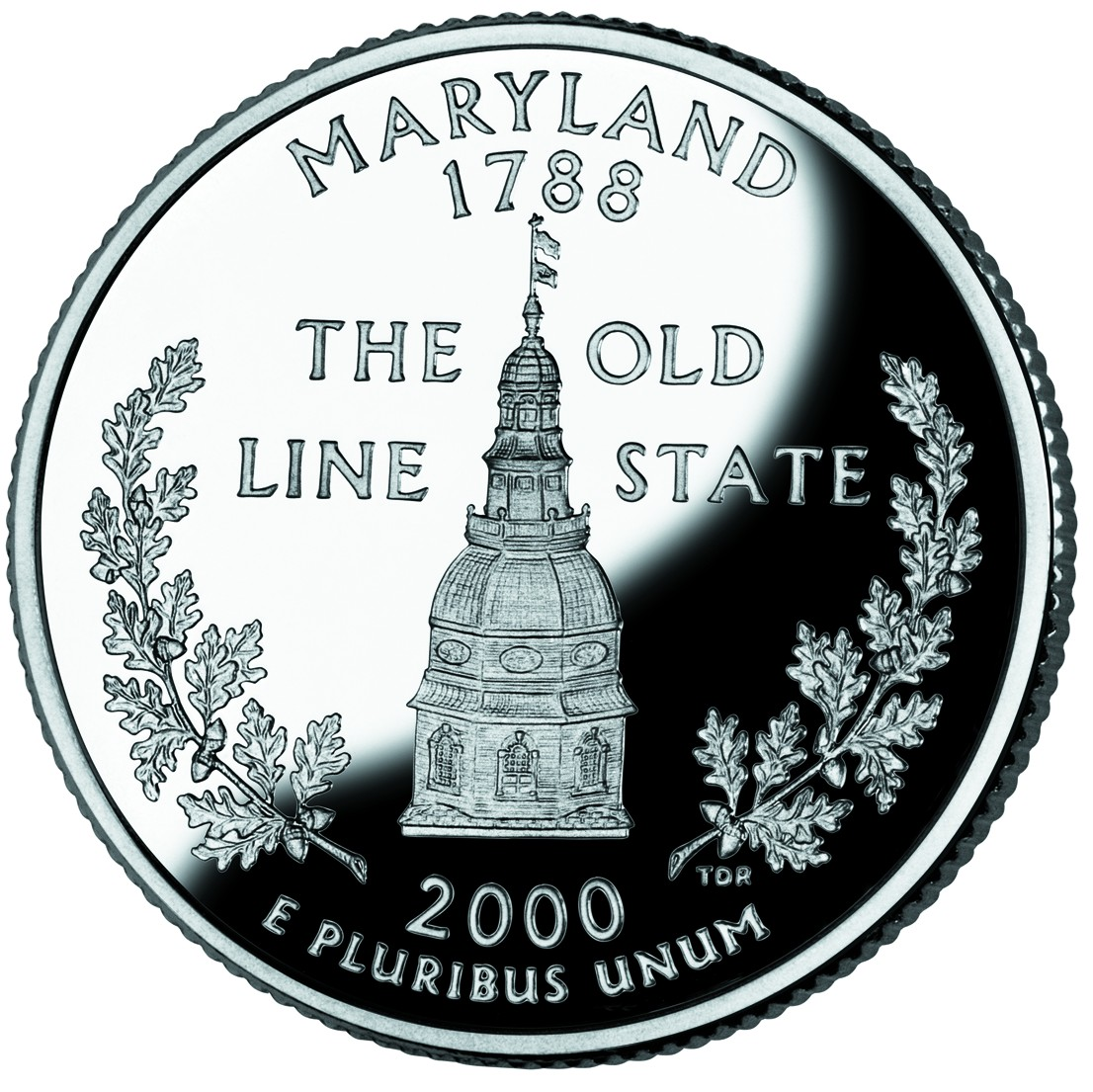
The dome of the statehouse is depicted on the Maryland state quarter.

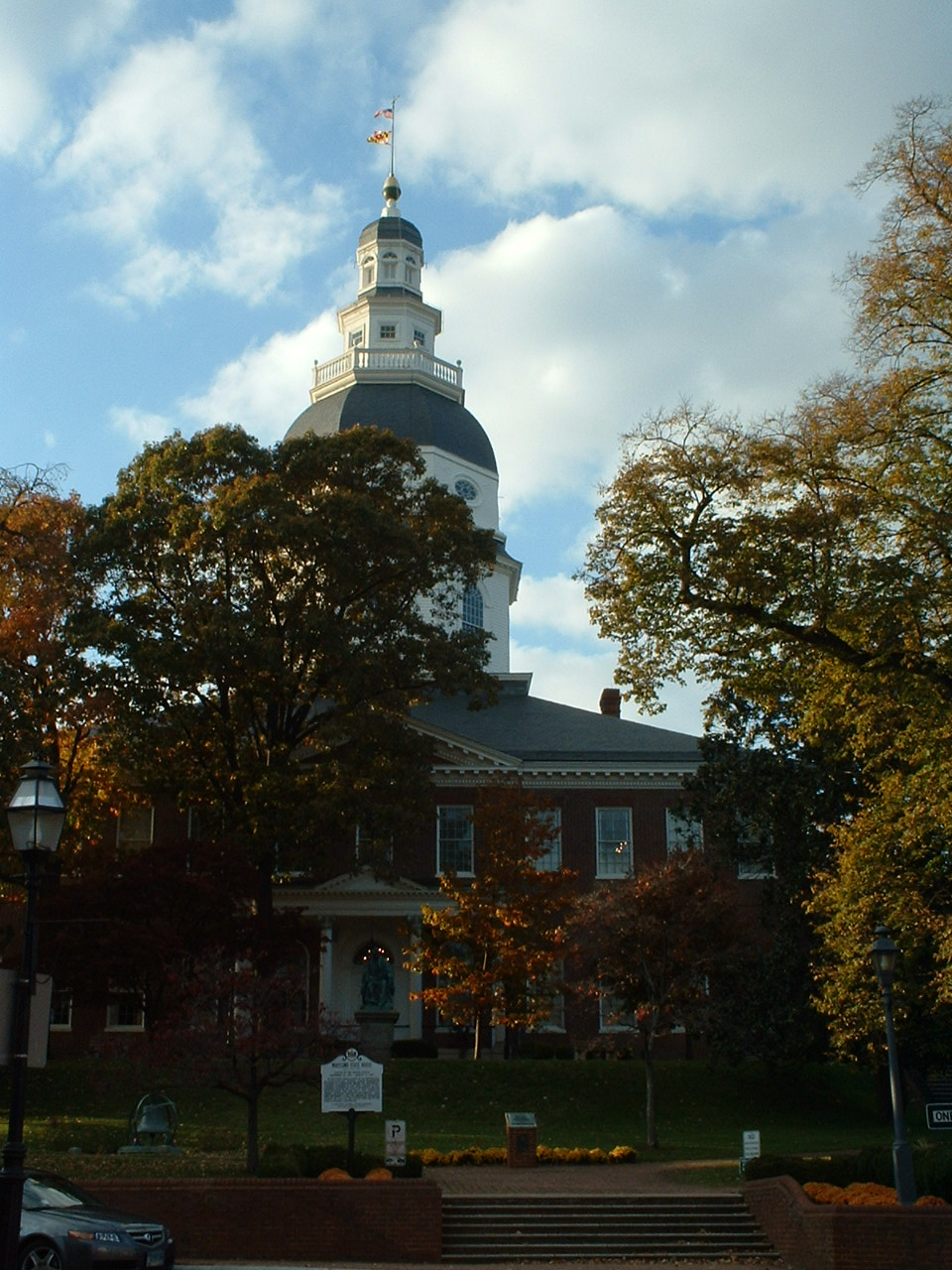
Maryland State House (front)

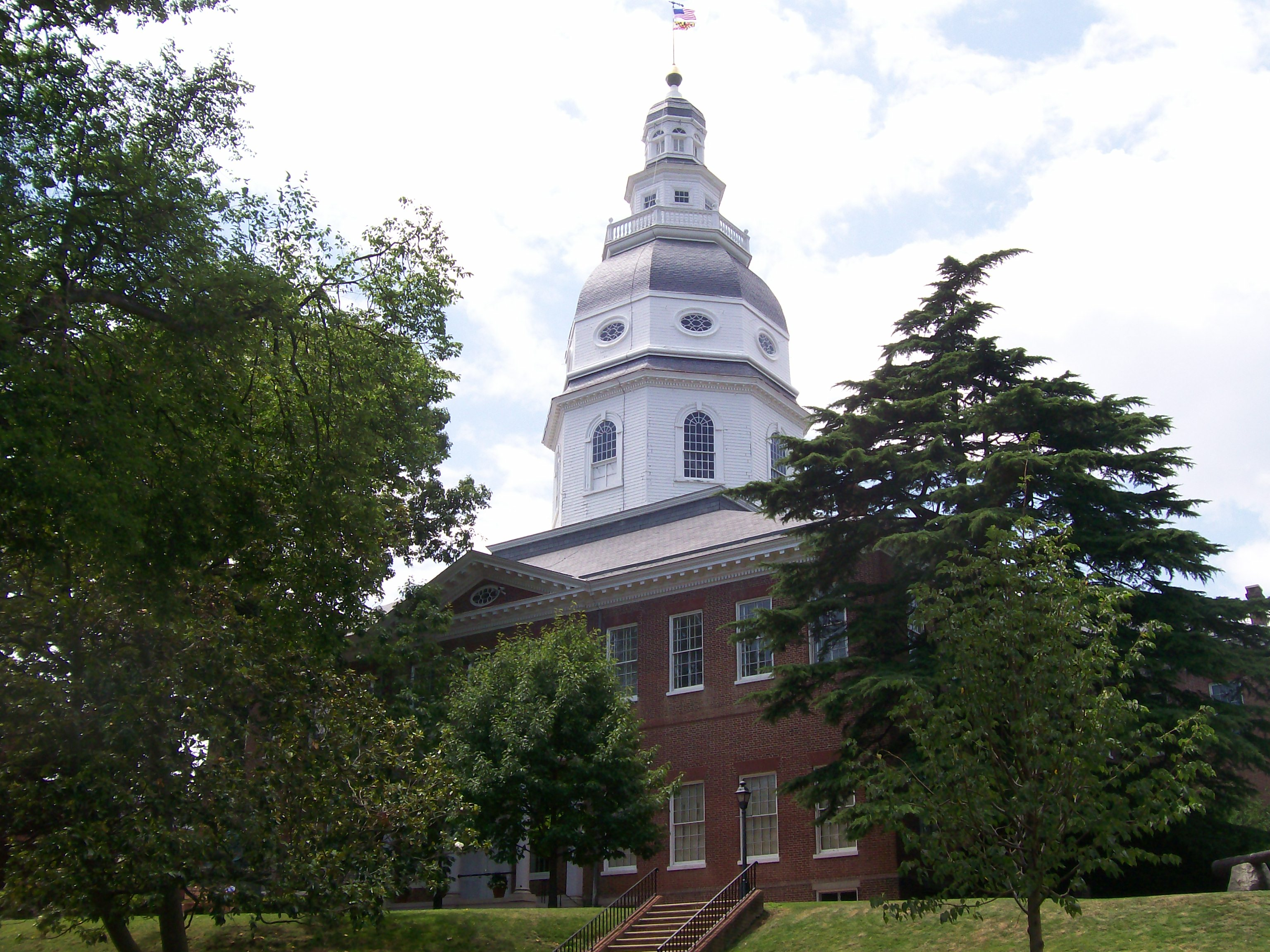
Maryland State House (side)

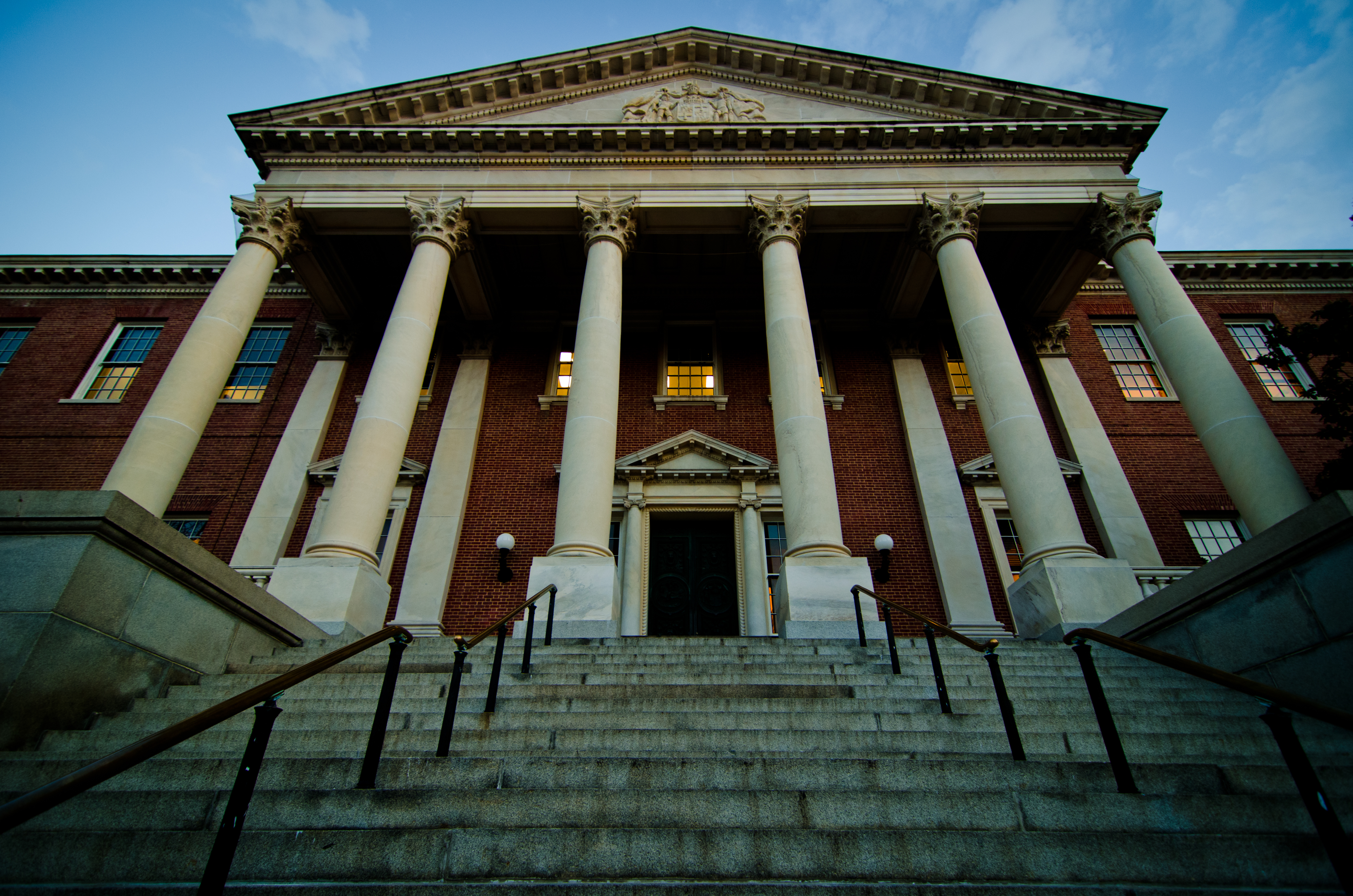
Maryland State House (rear from below)

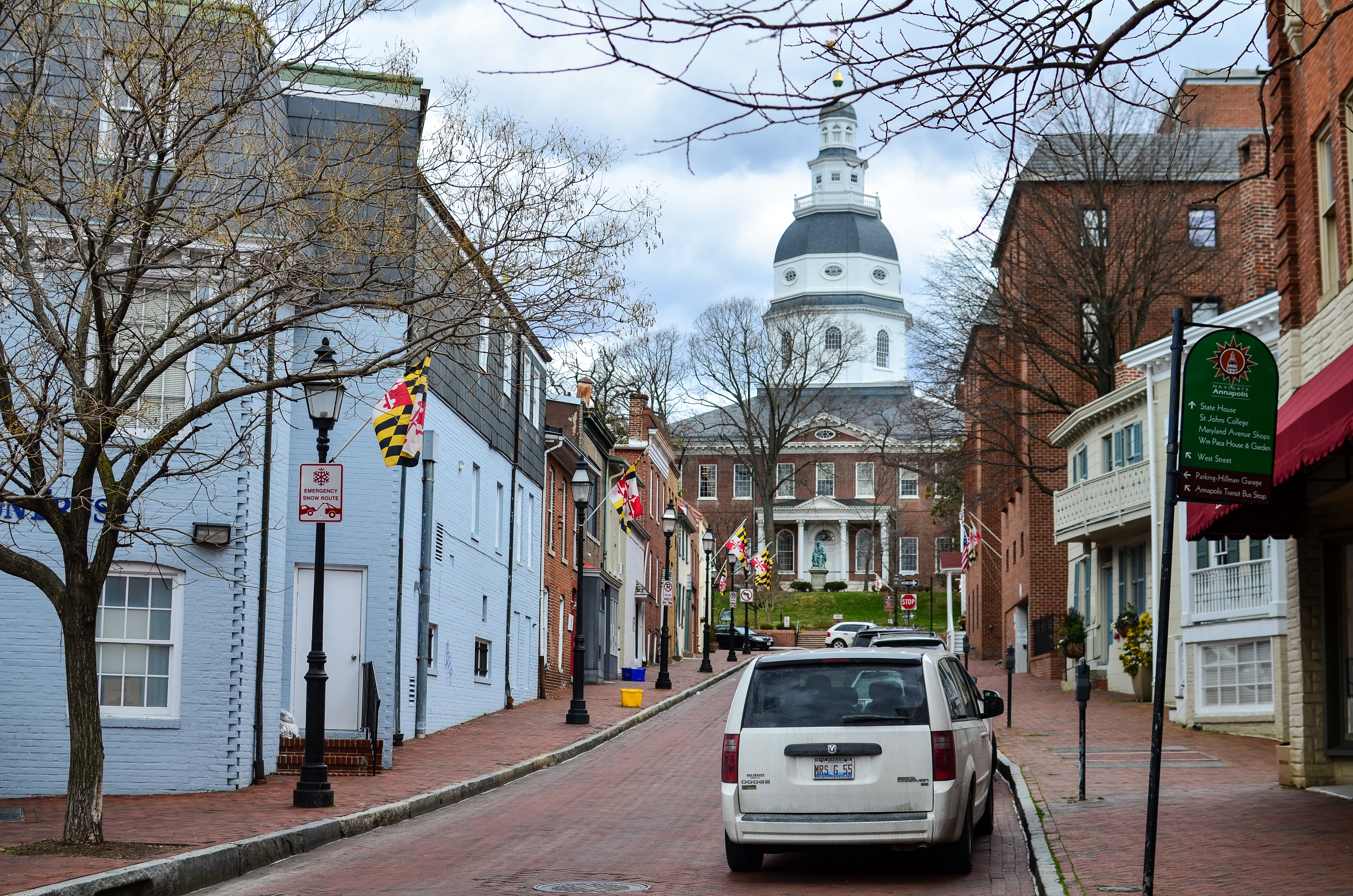
South view from Francis Street

== See also ==
- List of Maryland General Assemblies
- Maryland State Capitol Police
- 18th-century Western domes
- Impeachment in Maryland
- List of state and territorial capitols in the United States
