= Treaty of Paris (1783) =

Agreement ending the American Revolutionary War

The Definitive Treaty of Peace Between the Kingdom of Great Britain and the United States of America
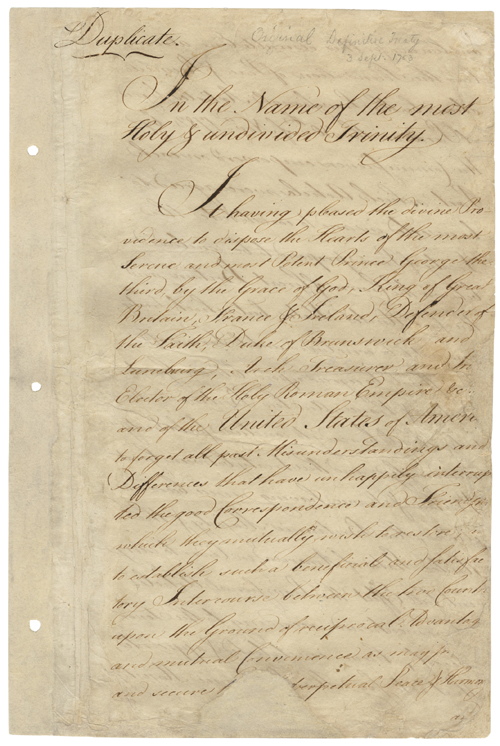
- The first page of the Treaty of Paris, signed on September 3, 1783
- Drafted: November 30, 1782
- Signed: September 3, 1783
- Location: Paris, Kingdom of France
- Effective: May 12, 1784; 242 years ago
- Condition: Ratified by both the Kingdom of Great Britain and the United States of America
- Signatories: David Hartley; John Adams; Benjamin Franklin; John Jay
- Parties: Great Britain; United States
- Depositary: United States government; United Kingdom government
- Language: English

Full text
- Treaty of Paris (1783) at Wikisource

The Treaty of Paris, signed by representatives of King George III of Great Britain and representatives of the United States on September 3, 1783, officially ended the War of American Independence and recognized the Thirteen Colonies, which had been part of colonial British America, to be free, sovereign, and independent unified states. It forms one treaty out of many that are collectively named the "Peace of Paris".

The treaty set the boundaries between British North America, later called Canada, and the United States, on lines the British labeled as "exceedingly generous", although exact boundary definitions in the far-northwest and to the south continued to be subject to some controversy. Details included fishing rights and restoration of property and prisoners of war.

Only Article 1 of the treaty, which acknowledges the United States' existence as free, sovereign, and independent states, remains in force.

== Agreement ==
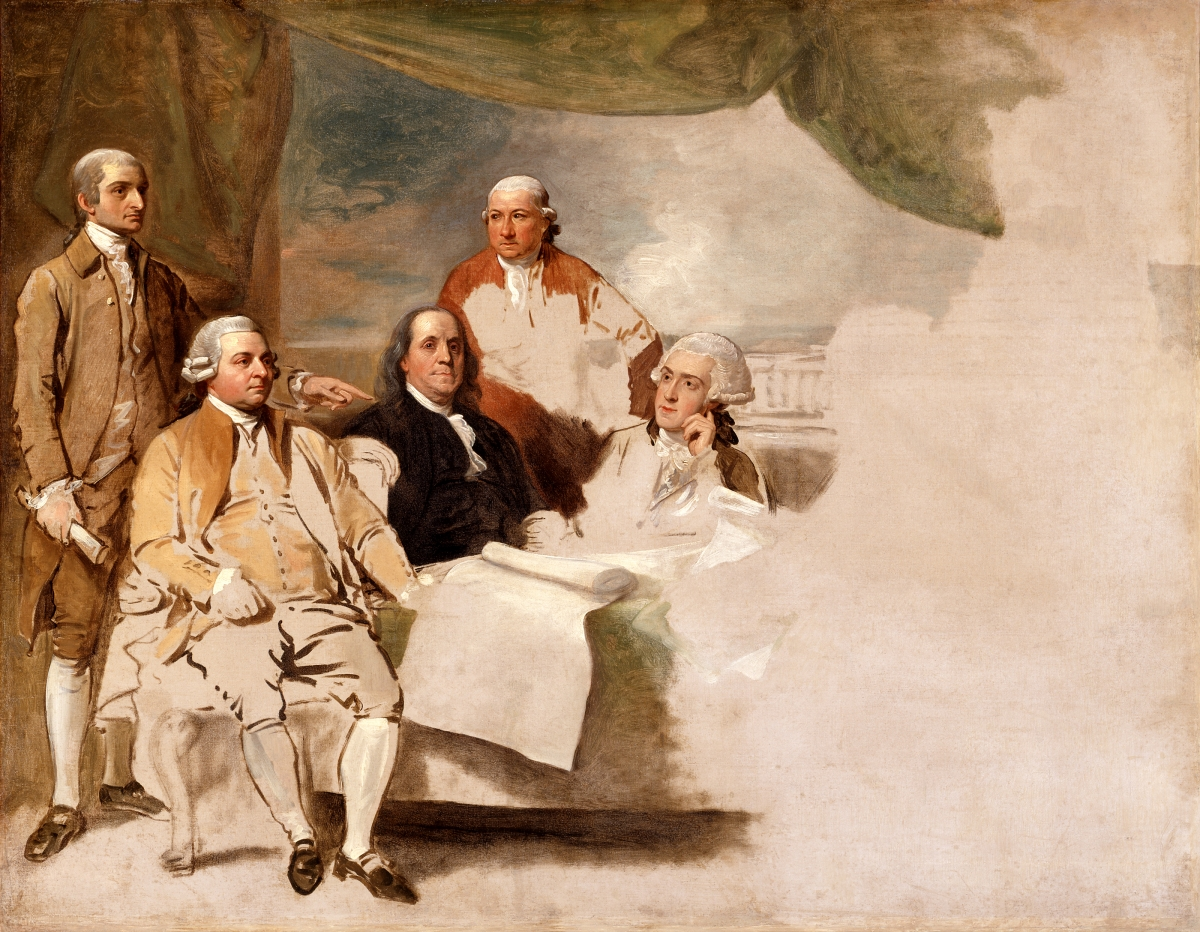
Treaty of Paris, a 1783 portrait by Benjamin West depicting the American delegation at the Treaty of Paris, including (left to right): John Jay, John Adams, Benjamin Franklin, Henry Laurens, and William Temple Franklin. The British delegation refused to pose, and the portrait was never completed.

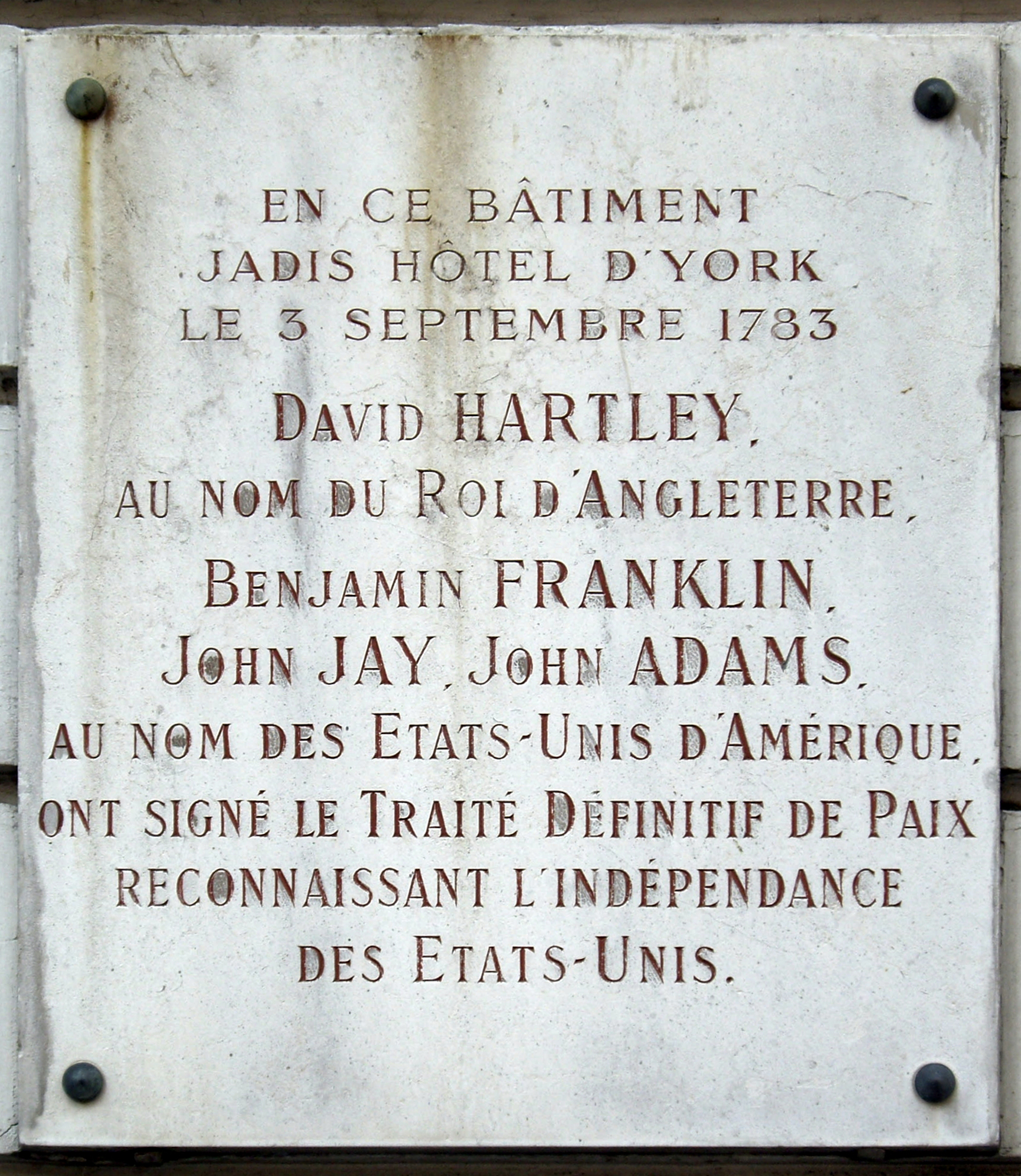
A commemorative plaque on the site where the treaty was signed, 56 Rue Jacob in Paris, on September 3, 1783

Peace negotiations began in Paris in April 1782, following the fall of Prime Minister Frederick North's government on 20 March, in the wake of British defeat at Yorktown in the U.S. War for Independence at the hands of the Continental Army, the French Royal Army, and the French Royal Navy. The negotiations continued through the summer of 1782. Representing the United States were Benjamin Franklin, John Jay, Henry Laurens, and John Adams. Representing the Kingdom of Great Britain and King George III were David Hartley and Richard Oswald.

The treaty was drafted on November 30, 1782, (Note: The same day as the lopsided American loss at the Battle of Kedges Strait in Chesapeake Bay, one of the numerous ongoing engagements with the British and Loyalist forces throughout 1782 and 1783.) and signed at the Hôtel d'York at present-day 56 Rue Jacob in Paris on September 3, 1783, by Adams, Franklin, Jay, and Hartley.

In September 1782, French Foreign Minister Vergennes proposed a solution to deadlocked negotiations between the United States and the British, which was rejected by the United States. France was exhausted by the war, and all parties sought peace, except for Spain, which insisted on continuing the Revolutionary War until it could capture Gibraltar from the British. Vergennes developed treaty terms under which Spain would forego holding Gibraltar and the United States would be granted independence, but it would be confined to the area east of the Appalachian Mountains. Britain would keep the area north of the Ohio River, which was part of the Province of Quebec. In the area south of that would be an independent Indian barrier state, under Spanish control.

The American delegation perceived that they could obtain a better treaty in negotiating directly with the British in London. John Jay promptly told the British that he was willing to negotiate directly with them and to bypass France and Spain, and British Prime Minister Lord Shelburne agreed. In charge of the British negotiations, some of which took place in his study at Lansdowne House, now a bar in the Lansdowne Club, Shelburne now saw a chance to split the United States from France and to establish the new nation as a valuable economic partner. The terms were that the United States would gain all of the area east of the Mississippi River, north of present-day Florida, and south of present-day Canada. The northern boundary would be almost the same as it is today.

The United States would gain fishing rights off Nova Scotia's coasts and agreed to allow British merchants and Loyalists to try to recover their property. The treaty was highly favorable for the United States and deliberately so from the British point of view. Shelburne foresaw highly profitable two-way trade between Britain and the rapidly-growing United States, which came to pass.

Great Britain also signed separate agreements with France and Spain and provisionally with the Netherlands. In the treaty with Spain, the territories of East and West Florida were ceded to Spain without a clear northern boundary, which resulted in a territorial dispute resolved by the Treaty of Madrid in 1795. Spain also received the island of Menorca, but the Bahamas, Grenada, and Montserrat, which had been captured by the French and Spaniards, were returned to Britain. The treaty with France was mostly about exchanges of captured territory. France's only net gains were the island of Tobago, and Senegal in Africa, but it also reinforced earlier treaties, guaranteeing fishing rights off Newfoundland. Dutch possessions in the East Indies, captured in 1781, were returned by Britain to the Netherlands in exchange for trading privileges in the Dutch East Indies by a treaty, which was not finalized until 1784.

The Congress of the Confederation, operating as the legislative body of the newly established United States, ratified the Treaty of Paris on January 14, 1784, in Annapolis, Maryland, in the Old Senate Chamber of the Maryland State House. Copies were sent back to Europe for ratification by the other parties involved, the first reaching France in March 1784. British ratification occurred on April 9, 1784, and the ratified versions were exchanged in Paris on May 12, 1784.

Title page, copy of the treaty for King George III. UK National Archives. Foreign Office documents, FO93/8/2

== Terms ==
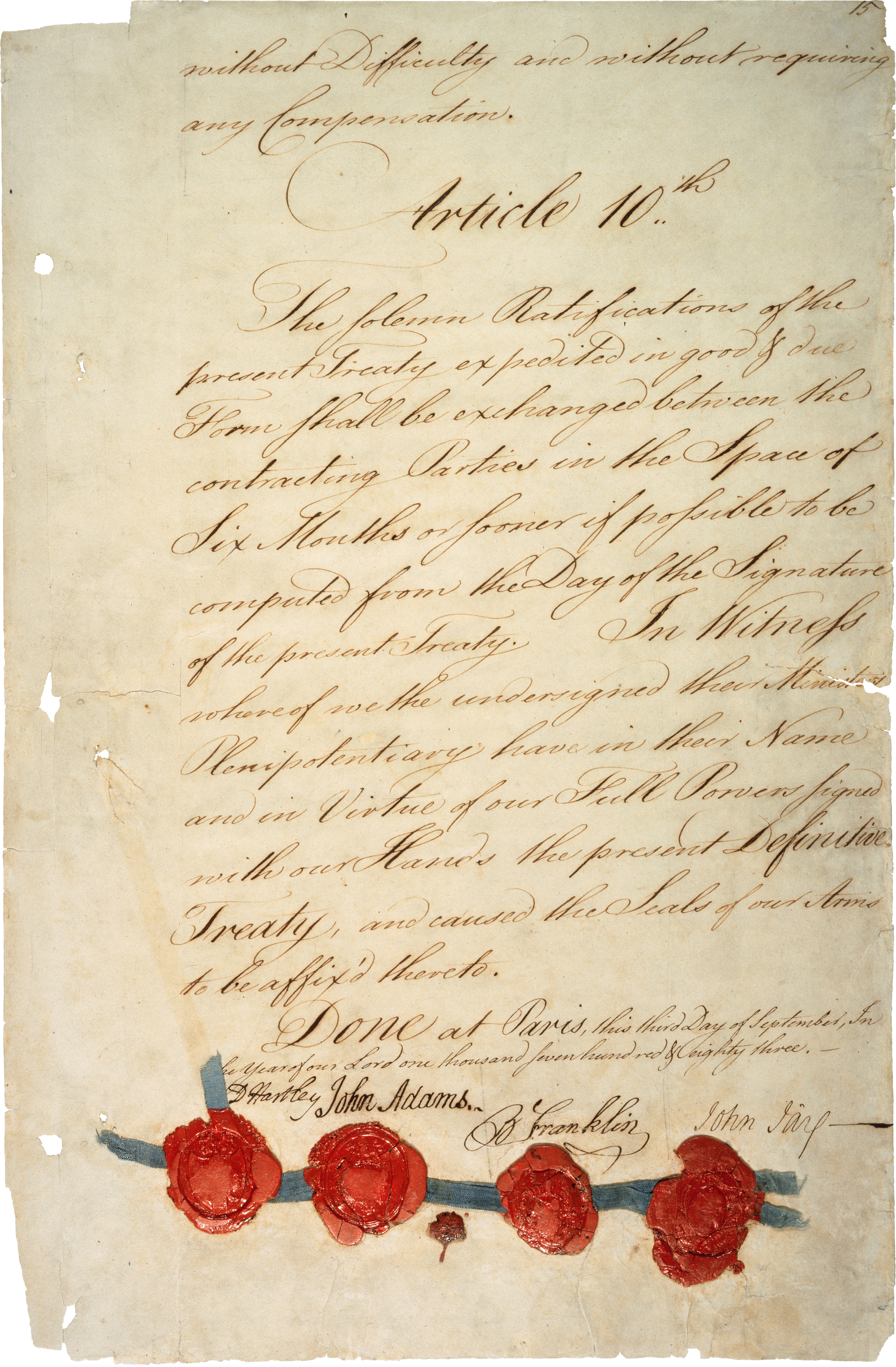
The last page of the treaty

The treaty and the separate peace treaties between Great Britain and the three colonial powers that supported the American cause, France, Spain, and the Dutch Republic, are known collectively as the Peace of Paris. Only Article 1 of the treaty, which acknowledges the United States' existence as free sovereign and independent states, remains in force. The U.S. borders changed in later years, which is a major reason specific articles of the treaty were superseded.

Preamble. Declares the treaty to be "in the Name of the Most Holy and Undivided Trinity" followed by a reference to the divine providence, states the bona fides of the signatories, and declares the intention of both parties to "forget all past misunderstandings and differences" and "secure to both perpetual peace and harmony."

1. Britain acknowledges the United States, comprising what had been the Province of New Hampshire, Province of Massachusetts Bay, Colony of Rhode Island and Providence Plantations, Connecticut Colony, Province of New York, Province of New Jersey, Province of Pennsylvania, Delaware Colony, Province of Maryland, Colony of Virginia, Province of North Carolina, Province of South Carolina, and Province of Georgia, to be free, sovereign, and independent states, and that the British Crown and all heirs and successors relinquish claims to the Government, property, and territorial rights of the same, and every part thereof,
2. Establishing the boundaries of the United States, including but not limited to those between the United States and British North America from the Mississippi River to the Southern colonies. Britain surrenders their previously owned land,
3. Granting fishing rights to United States fishermen in the Grand Banks, off the coast of Newfoundland and in the Gulf of Saint Lawrence;
4. "Creditors on either Side shall meet with no Lawful Impediment to the Recovery of the full Value in Sterling Money of all bona fide Debts heretofore contracted."
5. The Congress of the Confederation will "earnestly recommend" to state legislatures to recognize the rightful owners of all confiscated lands and "provide for the restitution of all estates, rights, and properties, which have been confiscated belonging to British subjects" (Loyalists);
6. The United States will prevent future confiscations of the property of Loyalists;
7. Prisoners-of-war on both sides are to be released. All British property now in the United States is to remain with them and to be forfeited;
8. Both Great Britain and the United States are to be given perpetual access to the Mississippi River;
9. Territories captured by either side subsequent to the treaty will be returned without compensation;
10. Ratification of the treaty is to occur within six months from its signing.

Eschatocol. "Done at Paris, this third day of September in the year of our Lord, one thousand seven hundred and eighty-three."

== Gallery ==
Maps proposed for US territory by France (1782), Spain (1782), Great Britain (1783)

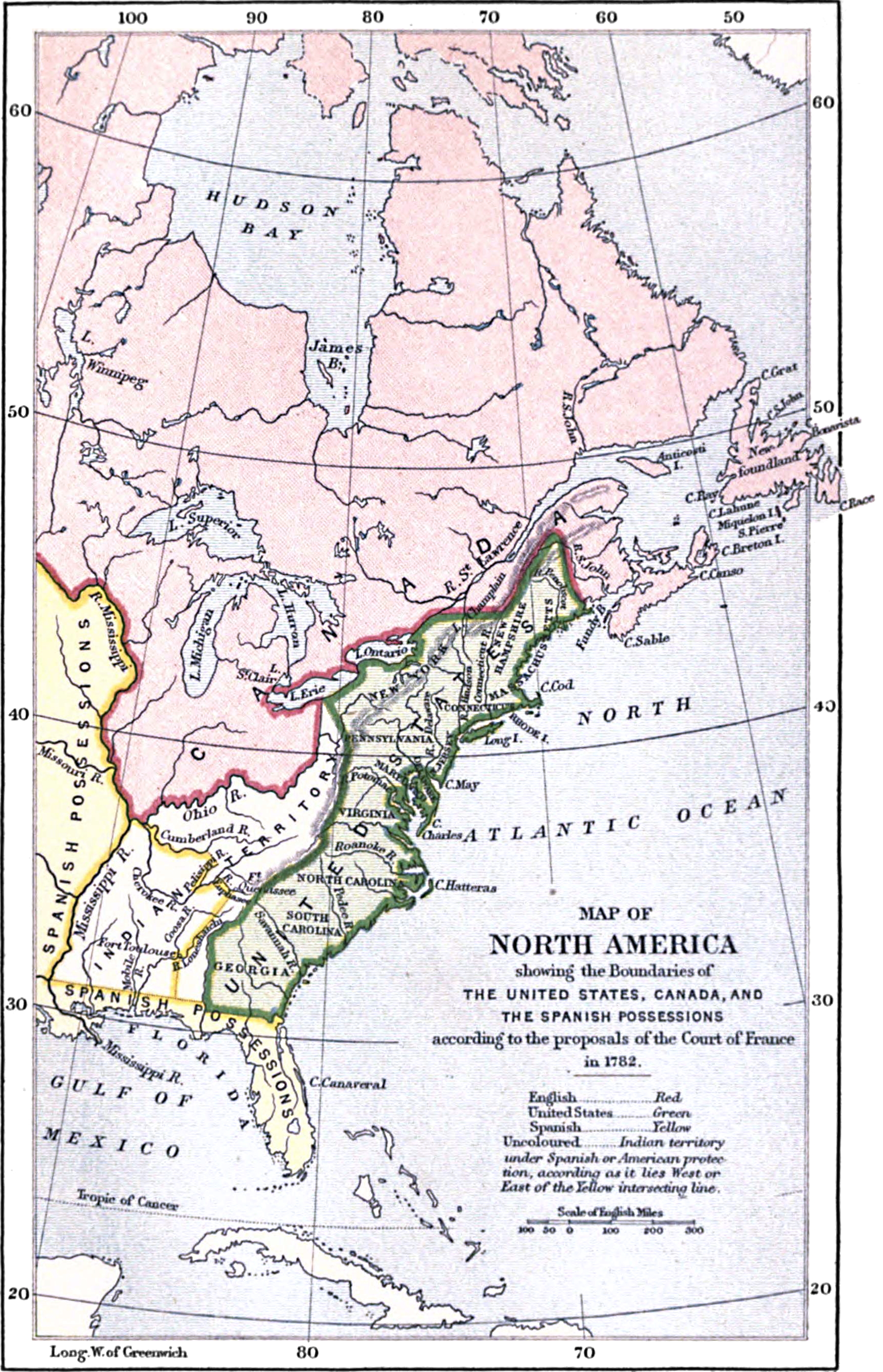
French: readopt Royal Proclamation of 1763 (Note: The French proposed King George III's 1763 Proclamation Line which arbitrarily cut off the colonial charter land grants of the 1600s. At the time it inflamed American colonists and took away their good feeling for the British and American victory over the French in the Seven Years' War (French and Indian War). The US western boundary from the southern shore midpoint of Lake Erie, southeast to the Appalachian Mountains, south along the Eastern Continental Divide to Georgia, then south to Spain's East Florida.)

Spanish: Britain is meant to cede Georgia to Spain; US gains easternmost sliver of western Quebec. (Note: The US western boundary from southern end of Lake Erie, south to the confluence of the Grand Kanawa and Ohio Rivers (mid-modern West Virginia), southerly to the South Carolina boundary at the Appalachian Mountains; but Savannah and Georgia ceded by Britain to Spain.)

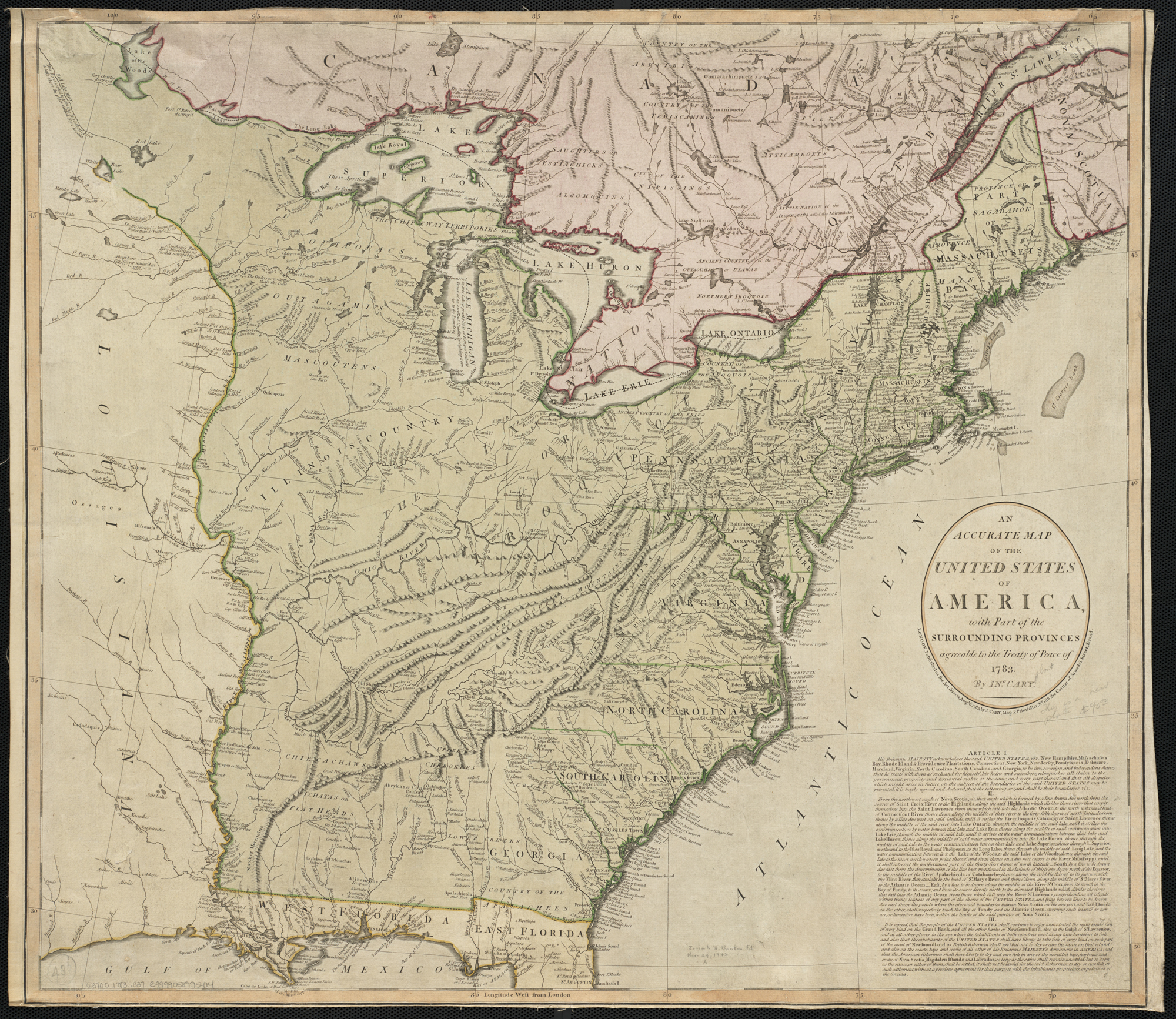
British and US: "Conclusive" Treaty of Paris, US west to Mississippi River midpoint (Note: US boundaries defined in the Treaty of Paris (1783) between Great Britain and the United States alone, Article 2. (a) west: "… from the northwest angle of Nova Scotia … through the middle of … [Lake Ontario, Lake Erie, Lake Huron, Lake Superior … Long Lake, Lake of the Woods], … "to the northwesternmost point thereof, and from thence on a due west course to the river Mississippi; (b) south: … thence … along the middle of the said river until it shall intersect with the northernmost part of the thirty-first degree of north latitude; (c) east" … to the Atlantic Ocean … comprehending all islands within twenty leagues of any part of the shores of the United States … between … Nova Scotia [on the north] … and East Florida … [on the south]")

Negotiations for peace in the American Revolutionary War from 1779 to 1783.

== Consequences ==
Map of the United States and its territories following the signing of the treaty

Historians have often commented that the treaty was very generous to the United States in terms of greatly enlarged boundaries. Historians such as Alvord, Harlow, and Ritcheson have emphasized that British generosity was based on a statesmanlike vision of close economic ties between Britain and the United States. The concession of the vast trans-Appalachian region was designed to facilitate the growth of the American population and to create lucrative markets for British merchants without any military or administrative costs to Britain. The point was that the United States would become a major trading partner. As French Foreign Minister Vergennes later put it, "The English buy peace rather than make it." Vermont was included within the boundaries because the state of New York insisted that Vermont was a part of New York although Vermont was then under a government that considered Vermont not to be a part of the United States.

Privileges that the Americans had automatically received from Britain when they had colonial status, including protection from Barbary corsairs in the Mediterranean Sea, were lost. Individual states ignored federal recommendations, under Article 5, to restore confiscated Loyalist property and Article 6, which provided for confiscating Loyalist property for "unpaid debts". The Commonwealth of Virginia defied Article 4 and maintained laws against payment of debts to British creditors. Several Loyalists attempted to file for a return for their property in the US legal system after the American Revolutionary War, but most were unsuccessful.

The actual geography of North America turned out not to match the details used in the treaty. The treaty specified a southern boundary for the United States, but the separate Anglo-Spanish agreement did not specify a northern boundary for Florida. The Spanish government assumed that the boundary was the same as in the 1763 agreement by which it had first given its territory in Florida to Great Britain. While the West Florida Controversy continued, Spain used its new control of Florida to block American access to the Mississippi, in defiance of Article 8. To the north, the treaty stated that the boundary of the United States extended from the "most northwesternmost point" of the Lake of the Woods in present-day Minnesota, Manitoba, and Ontario, directly westward until it reached the Mississippi River. However, the Mississippi does not extend that far northward, and the line going west from the Lake of the Woods never intersects the river. Additionally, the Treaty of Paris did not explain how the new border would function in terms of controlling the movement of people and trade between British North America and the United States. The American diplomats' expectation of negotiating a commercial treaty with Britain to resolve some of the unfinished business of the Treaty of Paris failed to materialize in 1784. Despite government agreements for British evacuation of northern forts, Britain continued to occupy the forts. Meanwhile, the British were dissatisfied with the American harassment of Loyalists. The United States would thus wait until 1794 to negotiate its first commercial agreement with the British Empire, the Jay Treaty.

A major point of tension in Anglo-American relations after US independence was the British refusal to relinquish control over eight forts in what was technically American territory "with all convenient speed". Six of the forts were located in the Great Lakes region and two were located at the north end of Lake Champlain. The British also built another fort in present-day Ohio in 1794 during the Northwest Indian War. They justified the continued occupation of the forts by citing the United States' failure to abide by the terms of the Treaty of Paris, specifically the American promise to compensate British subjects, including Loyalists, for their wartime losses. All of the forts were relinquished peacefully through diplomatic means as a result of the Jay Treaty:

Name	Present-day location
Fort au Fer	Lake Champlain – Champlain, New York
Fort Dutchman's Point	Lake Champlain – North Hero, Vermont
Fort Lernoult (including Fort Detroit)	Detroit River – Detroit, Michigan
Fort Mackinac	Straits of Mackinac – Mackinac Island, Michigan
Fort Miami	Maumee River – Maumee, Ohio
Fort Niagara	Niagara River – Youngstown, New York
Fort Ontario	Lake Ontario – Oswego, New York
Fort Oswegatchie	Saint Lawrence River – Ogdensburg, New York

== See also ==
- Confederation Period, the era of United States history in the 1780s following the American Revolutionary War and prior to the ratification of the US Constitution
- Diplomacy in the American Revolutionary War
- History of the United States (1776–1789)
- List of United States treaties
- Ratification Day (United States)
- Transcript of the Treaty of Paris
- Bemis, Samuel Flagg (1957). The diplomacy of the American Revolution. Bloomington: Indiana University Press. OCLC 426007.
- Dull, Jonathan R. (1987). "Chapters 17-20". A diplomatic history of the American Revolution. New Haven: Yale University Press. ISBN 978-0-300-03886-6. JSTOR j.ctt32bwct.
- Graebner, Norman A.; Burns, Richard Dean; Siracusa, Joseph M. (2011). Foreign affairs and the founding fathers: from confederation to constitution, 1776-1787. Santa Barbara, Calif: ABC-CLIO. p. 199. ISBN 978-0-313-39826-1.
- Harlow, Vincent T. (1964). The founding of the Second British Empire, 1763-1793. Vol. 1. Discovery and revolution. London: Longman, Green & Co. OCLC 9972563.
- Hoffman, Ronald; Albert, Peter J., eds. (1981). Diplomacy and revolution: the Franco-American alliance of 1778. Charlottesville: University Press of Virginia. ISBN 978-0-8139-0864-9.
- Hoffman, Ronald; Albert, Peter J., eds. (1986). Peace and the peacemakers: the treaty of 1783. Perspectives on the American Revolution. Charlottesville: University Press of Virginia. ISBN 978-0-8139-1071-0. Specialized essays by scholars
- Kaplan, Lawrence S. (August 1983). "The Treaty of Paris, 1783: A Historiographical Challenge". The International History Review. 5 (3): 431–442. doi:10.1080/07075332.1983.9640322. ISSN 0707-5332. JSTOR 40105317.
- Morris, Richard B. (1983). "The Great Peace of 1783". Proceedings of the Massachusetts Historical Society. 95: 29–51. ISSN 0076-4981. JSTOR 25080922. "a summary of his long book"
- Morris, Richard Brandon (1965). The peacemakers; the great powers and American independence. New York: Harper & Row. OCLC 615777. A standard scholarly history
- Perkins, James Breck (1911). "Negotiations for Peace". France in the American Revolution. Boston, Mass.: Houghton Mifflin Harcourt. pp. 461–495. OCLC 177577.
- Ritcheson, C. R. (August 1983). "The Earl of Shelbourne and Peace with America, 1782–1783: Vision and Reality". The International History Review. 5 (3): 322–345. doi:10.1080/07075332.1983.9640318. ISSN 0707-5332. JSTOR 40105313.
- Stockley, Andrew (2001). Britain and France at the birth of America: the European powers and the peace negotiations of 1782-1783. Exeter: University of Exeter Press. ISBN 978-0-85989-615-3.

== Primary sources ==
- Franklin, Benjamin (2008). Cohn, Ellen R. (ed.). The papers of Benjamin Franklin. New Haven (Conn.): Yale University Press. ISBN 978-0-300-13448-3.
- Franklin, Benjamin (1906). Smyth, Albert H. (ed.). The Writings of Benjamin Franklin. Vol. VIII: 1780-1782. The Macmillan Company. p. 108. OCLC 1101824.
