= Ratification Day (United States) =

Anniversary of the Treaty of Paris ratification

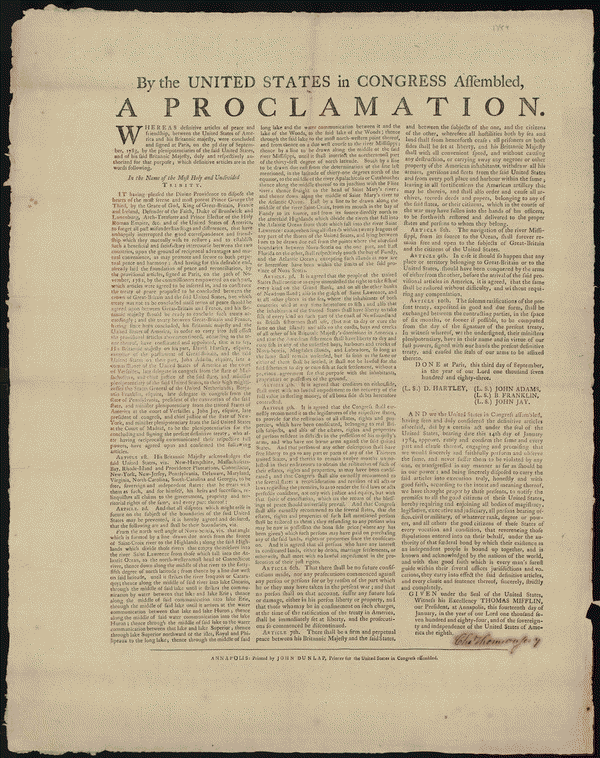
- Congressional Proclamation of Ratification of Treaty of Paris, January 14, 1784
- Date: January 14
- Next time: January 14, 2027
- Frequency: annual

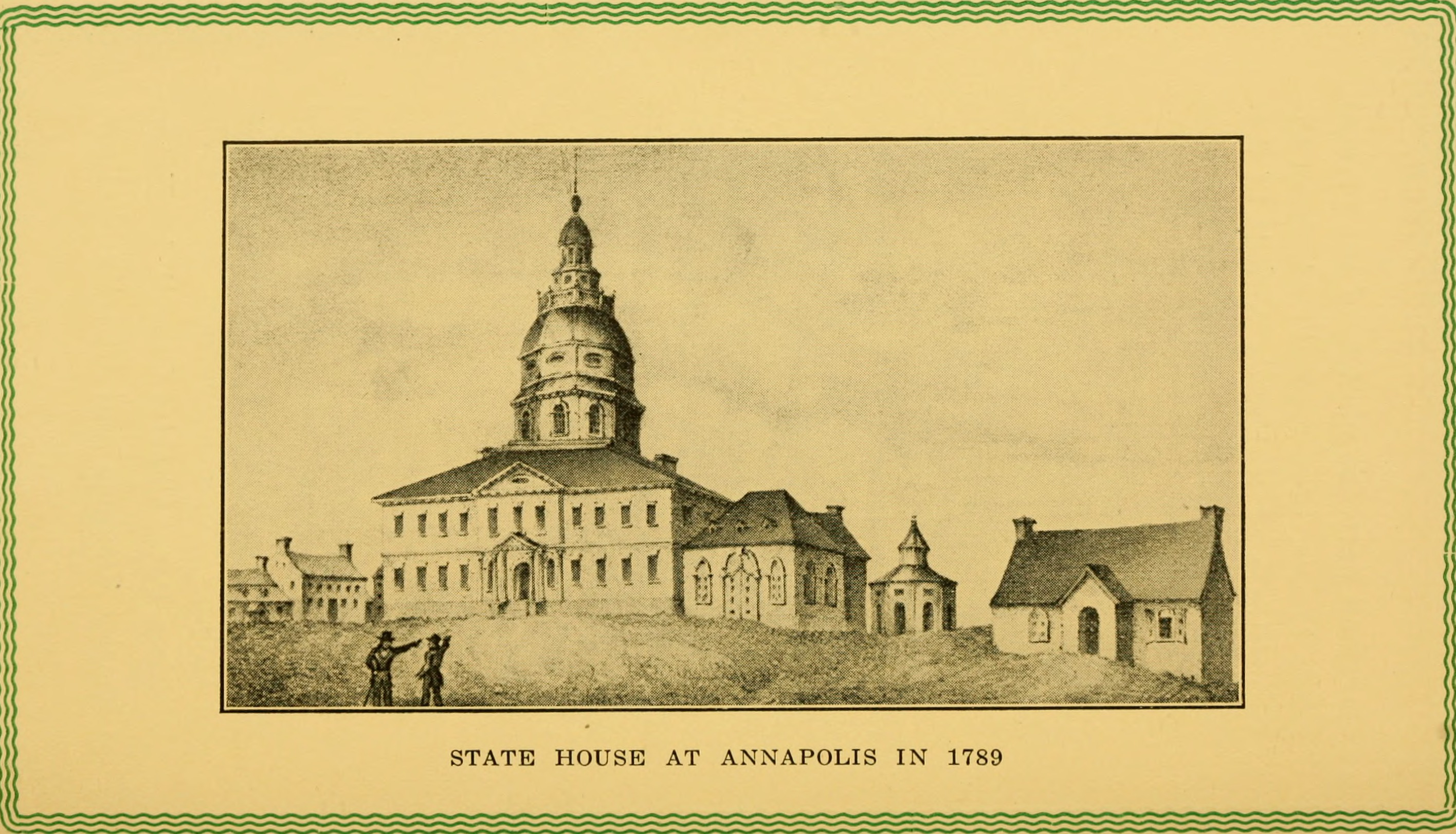
The ratification took place at Maryland State House, drawn here as it appeared in 1789.

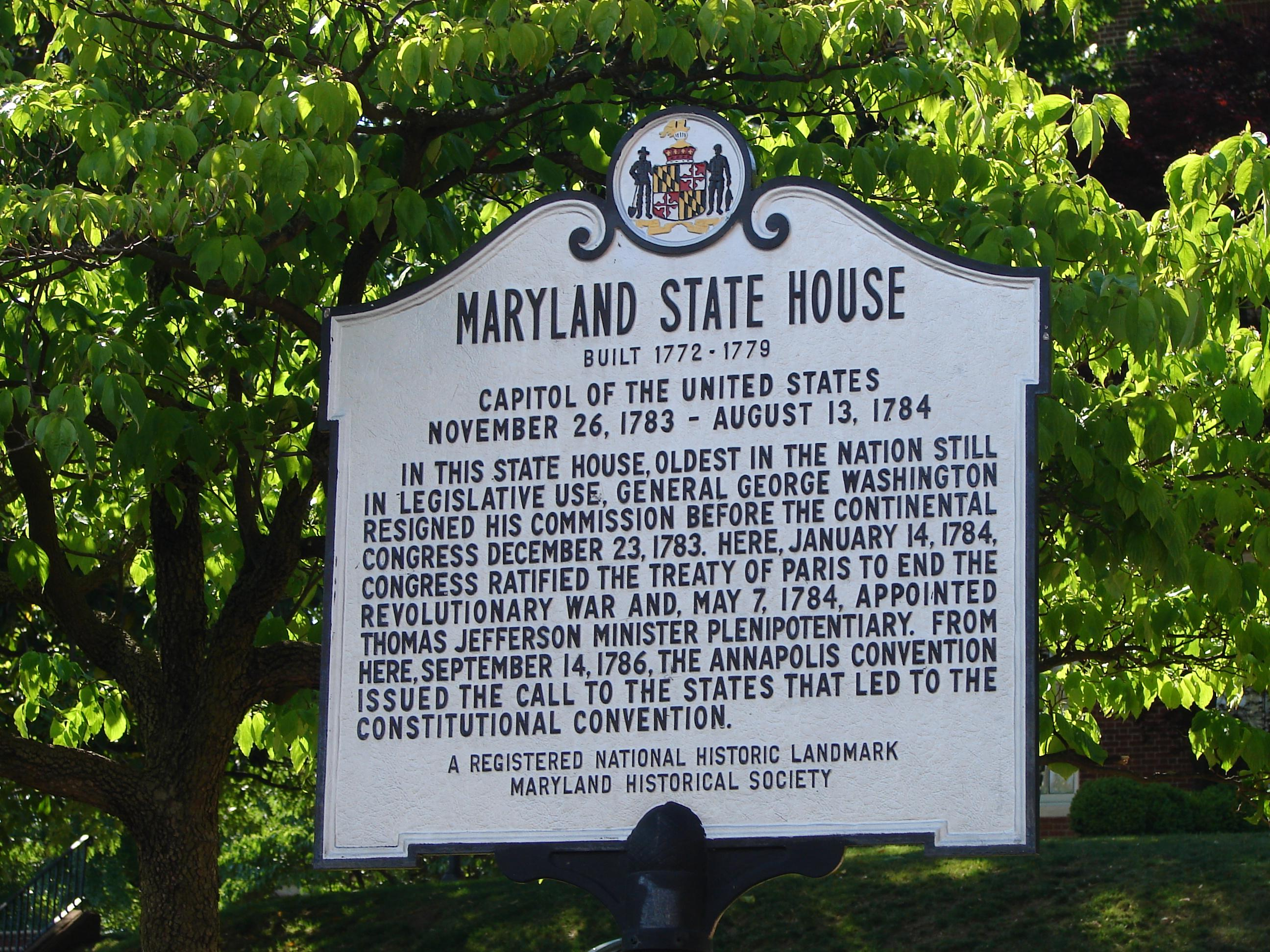
Historical marker at Maryland State House noting the ratification took place there.

Ratification Day in the United States is the anniversary of the congressional proclamation of the ratification of the Treaty of Paris, on January 14, 1784, at the Maryland State House in Annapolis, Maryland, by the Confederation Congress, which marked the official end of the American Revolutionary War.

== Proclamation of Congress ==
The Journals of the Continental Congress reports that the Confederation Congress proclaimed on April 11, 1783, "the cessation of arms" against Great Britain. Congress approved the preliminary articles of peace on April 15, 1783. The Treaty of Paris was signed on September 3, 1783, and ratified on January 14, 1784.

An excerpt from the proclamation of ratification:

By the United States in Congress assembled, a proclamation : Whereas definitive articles of peace and friendship, between the United States of America and His Britannic Majesty, were concluded and signed at Paris, on the 3rd day of September, 1783 ... we have thought proper by these presents, to notify the premises to all the good citizens of these United States ... Given under the seal of the United States, witness His Excellency Thomas Mifflin, our president, at Annapolis, this fourteenth day of January, in the year of our Lord one thousand seven hundred and eighty-four ...

== Congressional debate ==
Due to the severe winter of 1783–1784, delegates from only seven of the thirteen states were present in Congress. According to the Articles of Confederation and Perpetual Union, nine states were required to enter a treaty. One faction believed that seven states could ratify the treaty, arguing that they were merely ratifying and not entering it. Furthermore, it was unlikely that the required delegates could reach Annapolis before the ratification deadline.

Thomas Jefferson's faction believed that a full nine states were required to ratify the treaty and that any fewer would be trickery that Britain would eventually find out, giving it an excuse to nullify the treaty. Jefferson stated that it would be a "dishonorable prostitution" of the Great Seal of the United States.

== Jefferson's compromise ==
Jefferson was elected to head a committee of members of both factions and arrived at a compromise. Assuming that only seven states were present, Congress would pass a resolution stating that the seven states present were unanimously in favor of ratification of the treaty but were in disagreement as to the competency of Congress to ratify with only seven states. Although only seven states were present, their unanimous agreement in favor of ratification would be used to secure peace. The vote would not set a precedent for future decisions; the document would be forwarded to the U.S. ministers in Europe, who would be told to wait until a treaty ratified by nine states could arrive, and to request a delay of three months. However, if Britain insisted, the ministers should use the seven-state ratification, pleading that a full Congress was not in session.

Ultimately, delegates from Connecticut and South Carolina arrived at the last moment, and nine states ratified the treaty. Three copies were sent by separate couriers to ensure delivery.
