= Sunchime =

Sunlight-activated device similar to a windchime

A sunchime is a device analogous to a windchime but which uses sunlight instead of wind. A number of embodiments are documented, including:

- an architectural sculpture by Jeff G. Smith in Sandcastle Retreat, Clearwater, Florida using glass and steel elements suspended in a 12-foot-diameter (3.7 m) skylight
- a large public work of art in AZ Mills Mall, Tempe, Arizona by Zischke Studio
