= Architectural sculpture =

Use of sculptural techniques in architecture

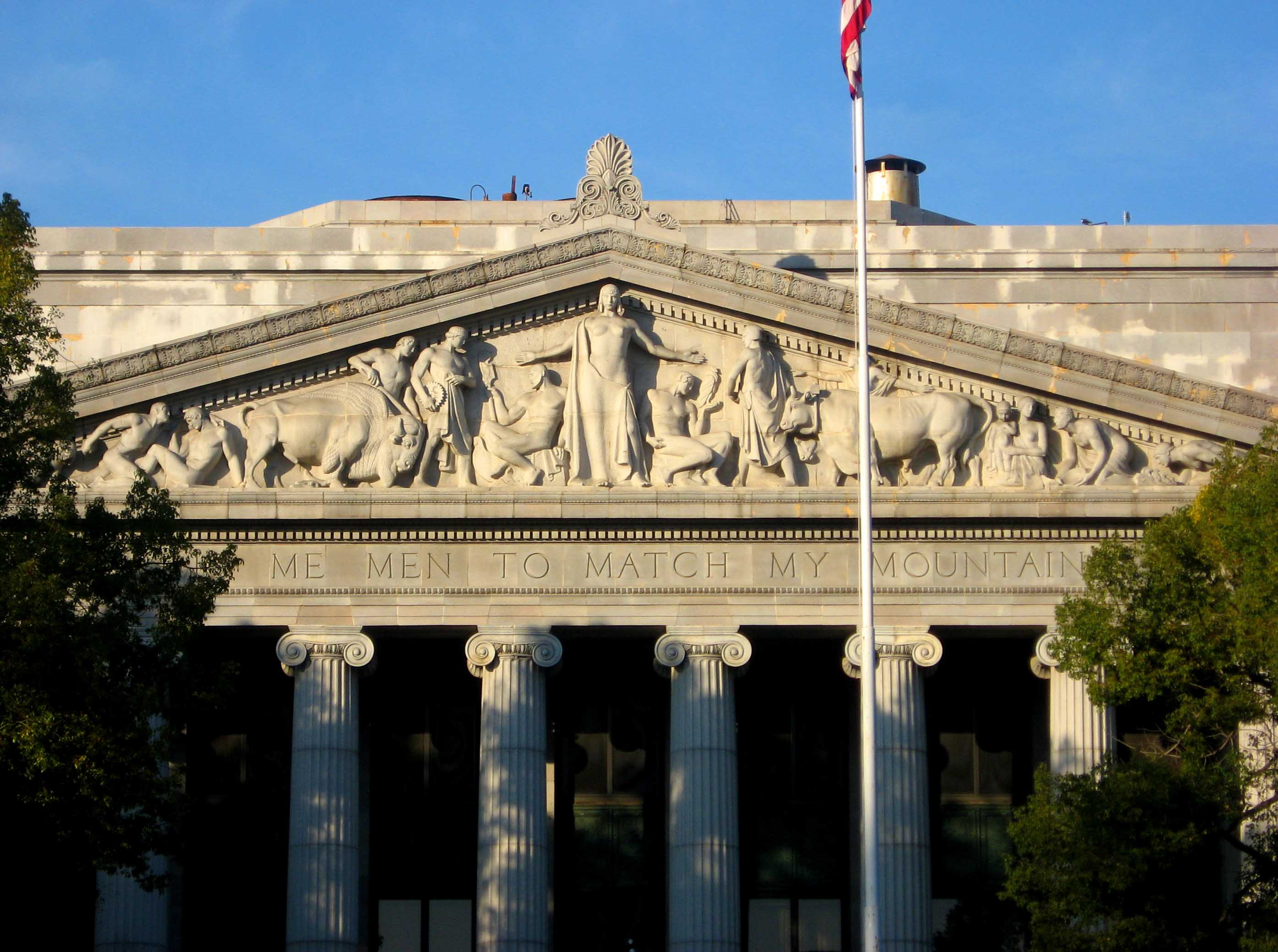
Pedimental sculpture in Sacramento, California, by 1928, following a style for ancient Greek temples

Architectural sculpture is the use of sculptural techniques by an architect and/or sculptor in the design of a building, bridge, mausoleum or other such project. The sculpture is usually integrated with the structure, but freestanding works that are part of the original design are also considered to be architectural sculpture. The concept overlaps with, or is a subset of, monumental sculpture.

It has also been defined as "an integral part of a building or sculpture created especially to decorate or embellish an architectural structure."

Architectural sculpture has been employed by builders throughout history, and in virtually every continent on earth save pre-colonial Australia.

== Egyptian ==
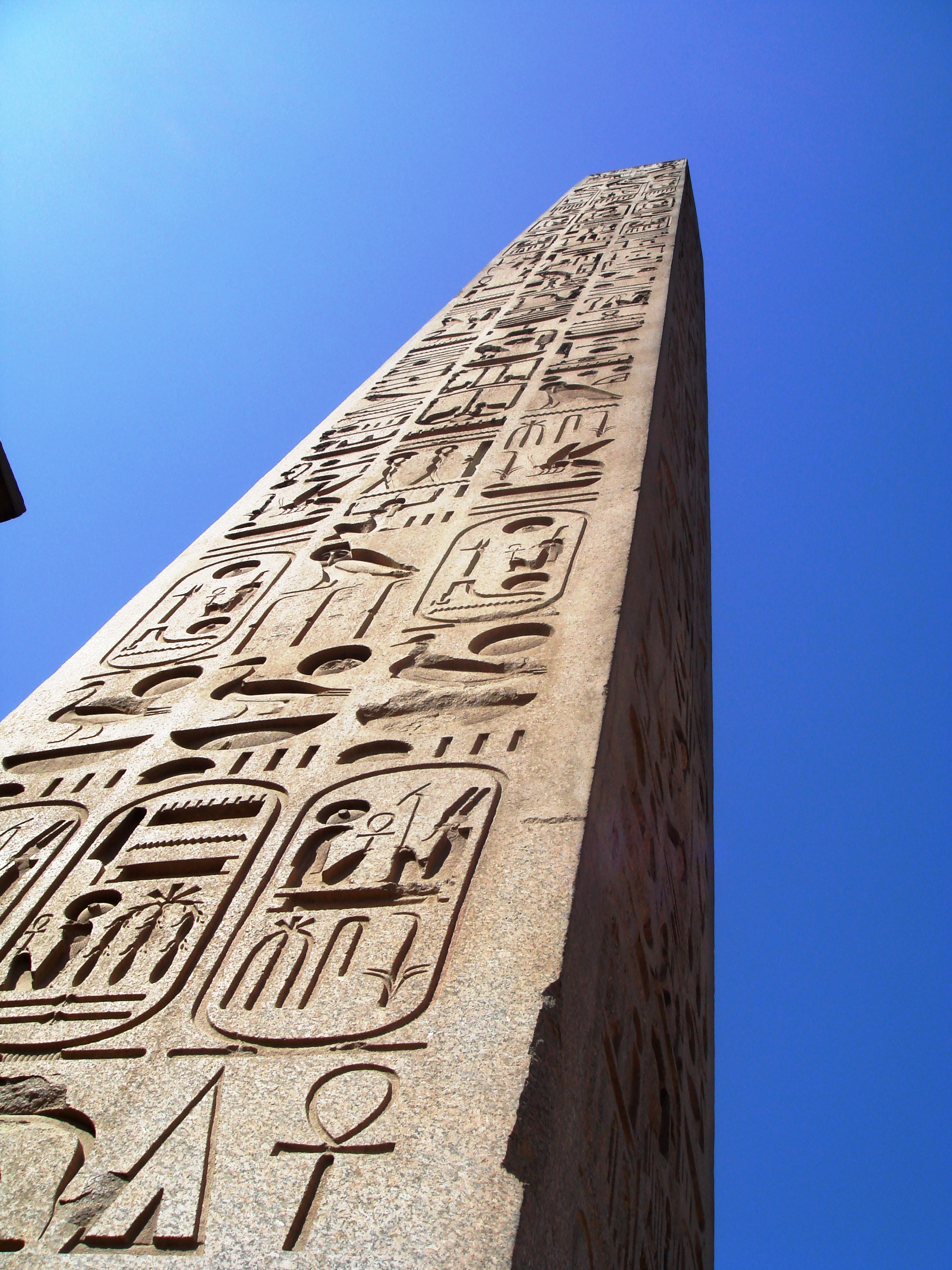
Luxor Obelisk

Modern understanding of ancient Egyptian architecture is based mainly on the religious monuments that have survived since antiquity, which are carved stone with post and lintel construction. These religious monuments dedicated to the gods or pharaohs were designed with a great deal of architectural sculpture inside and out: engaged statues, carved columns and pillars, and wall surfaces carved with bas-reliefs. The classic examples of Egyptian colossal monuments (the Great Sphinx of Giza, the Abu Simbel temples, the Karnak Temple Complex, etc.) represent thoroughly integrated combinations of architecture and sculpture.

Obelisks, elaborately carved from a single block of stone, were usually placed in pairs to flank the entrances to temples and pyramids.

Reliefs are also common in Egyptian building, depicting scenes of everyday life and often accompanied by hieroglyphics.

== Assyro-Babylonian ==
The Fertile Crescent architectural sculptural tradition began when Ashurnasirpal II moved his capitol to the city of Nimrud around 879 BCE. This site was located near a major deposit of gypsum (alabaster). This fairly easy to cut stone could be quarried in large blocks that allowed them to be easily carved for the palaces that were built there. The early style developed out of an already flourishing mural tradition by creating drawings that were then carved in low relief. Another contributing factor in the development of architectural sculpture were the small carved seals that had been made in the area for centuries.

== Greco-Roman ==
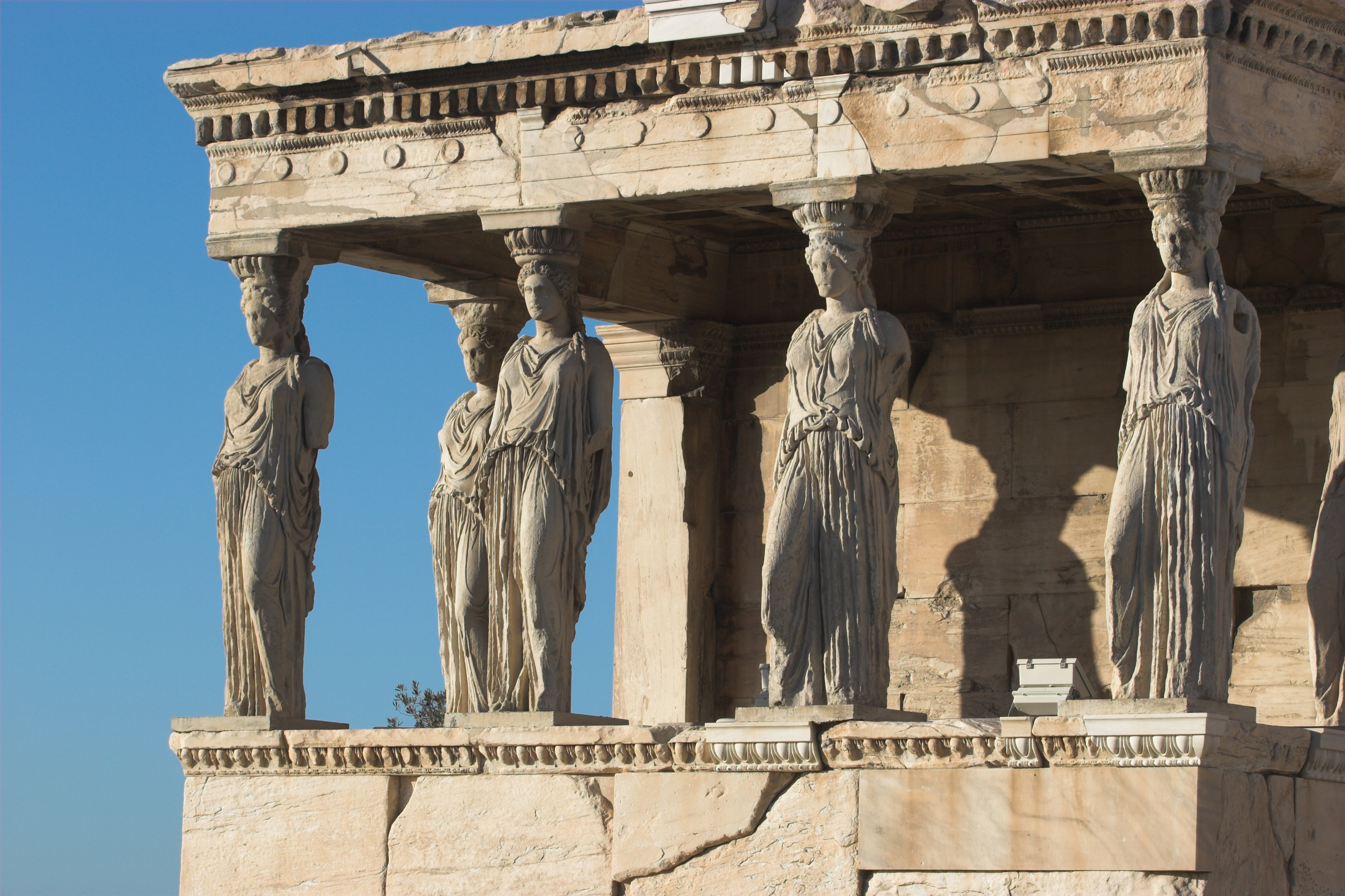
The Caryatid Porch of the Erechtheion, Athens, 421–407 BC

The most significant Greek introduction, well before the Classical period, was pedimental sculpture, fitting in the long, low triangle formed by the pediment above the portico of Greek temples. This remained a feature of later Greek and Roman temples and was revived in the Renaissance, with many new examples, by then mostly on large public buildings, created in the 19th and 20th centuries.

Classical Greek architecture, like the prototypical Parthenon, incorporate architectural sculpture in a fairly narrow set of standard, formal building elements. The names of these elements still comprise the usual vocabulary for discussion: the pediment, metope, frieze, caryatid, quadriga, acroteria, etc.

Greek examples of architectural sculpture are distinguished not only by their age but their very high quality and skilful technique, with rhythmic and dynamic modelling, figural compositions in friezes that continue seamlessly over vertical joints from one block of stone to the next, and mastery of depth and legibility.

The known Greek and Roman examples have been exhaustively studied, and frequently copied or adapted into subsequent neoclassical styles: Greek Revival architecture (usually the most strict), Neoclassical architecture, Beaux-Arts architecture with its exaggerated and romantic free interpretations of the vocabulary, and even Stalinist architecture like the Central Moscow Hippodrome adapted to a totalitarian aesthetic. These re-interpretations are sometimes dubious; for instance, there are many modern copies of the Mausoleum of Halicarnassus, like the National Diet Building in Tokyo, despite the fact that all classical descriptions of the Mausoleum are vague.

== European ==
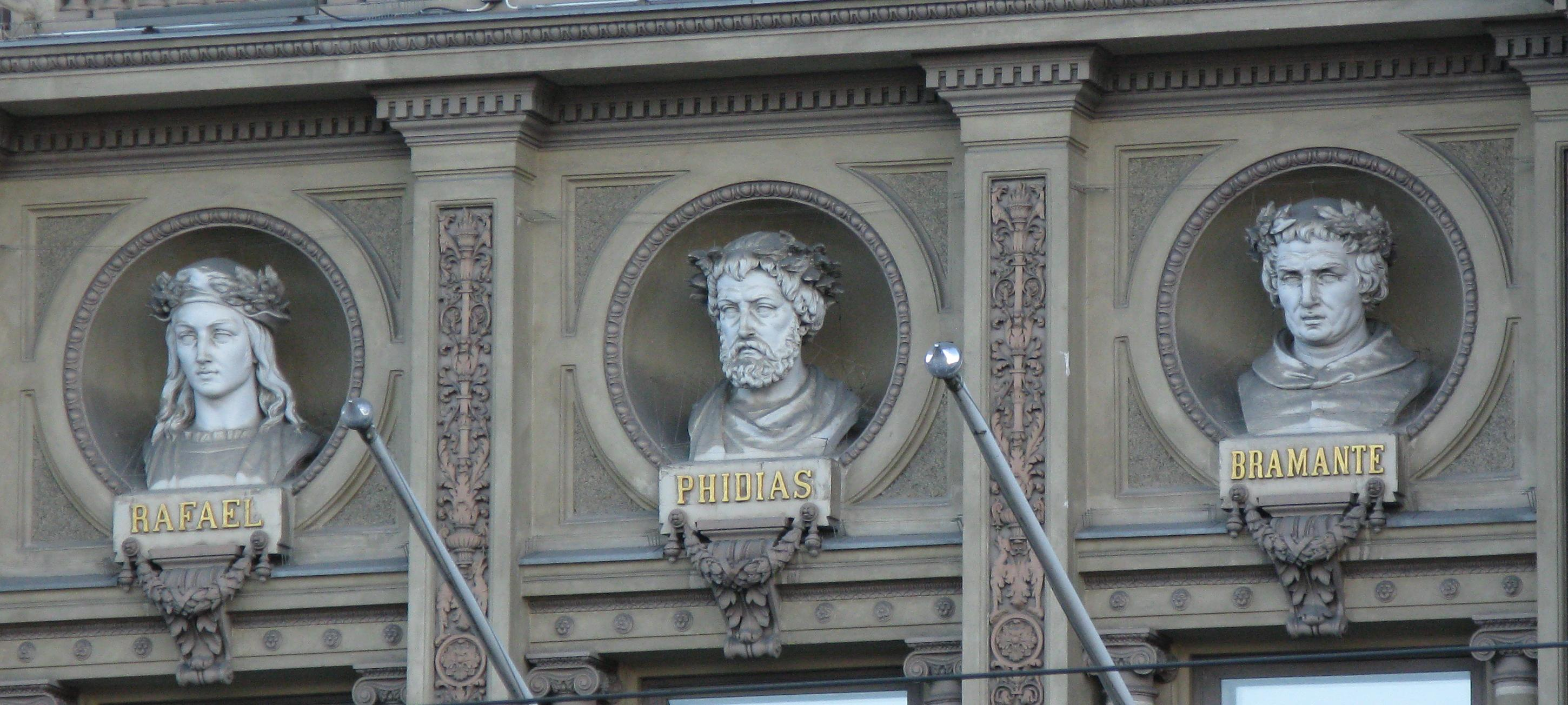
Bust sculptures of Raphael, Phidias and Donato Bramante by C. E. Sjöstrand on the facade of Ateneum in Helsinki, Finland

== Post-contact North and South America ==
=== United States ===
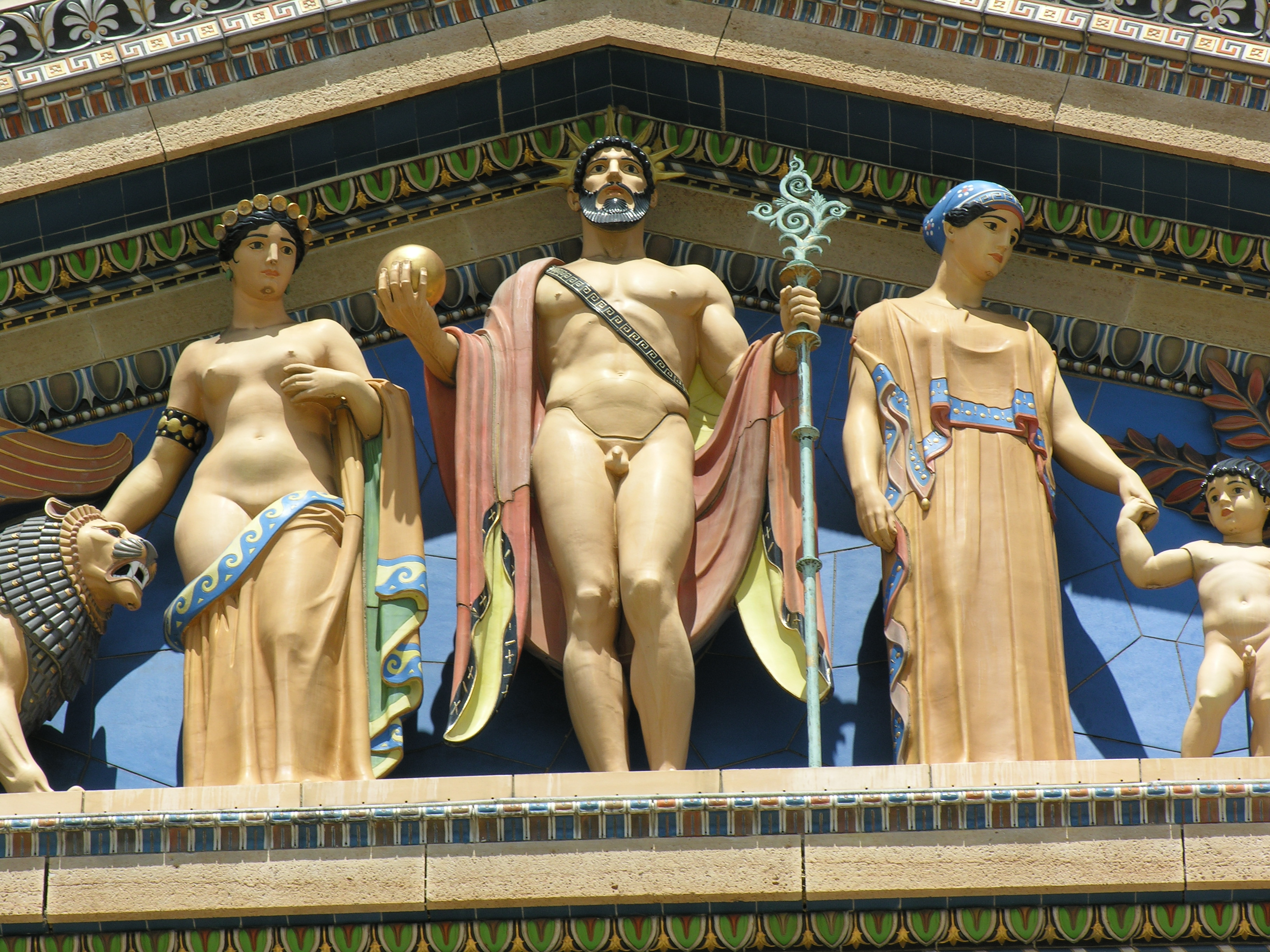
Pedimental sculpture in polychrome terracotta, Philadelphia Museum of Art, sculptor C. Paul Jennewein, 1933

Not until about 1870 did the U.S. develop the talent, the economic power, and the taste for buildings grand enough to need architectural sculpture. The Philadelphia City Hall, constructed 1871 through 1901, is recognized as the turning point, because of the approximately 250 sculptures planned for the building, the large finial of William Penn, and the practical effect of Alexander Milne Calder training many assistants there.

In the same years, H.H. Richardson began to develop his influential signature genre, which included romantic, medieval, and Romanesque stone carving. Richard Morris Hunt became the first to bring the Parisian neo-classical École des Beaux-Arts style back to the United States, a style that depended on integrated figural sculpture and a highly ornamented building fabric for its aesthetic effect. The Beaux-Arts style dominated for major public buildings between the 1893 World's Columbian Exposition in Chicago, through about 1912, the year of the San Francisco City Hall. The need for sculptors saw the emergence of a small industry of carvers and modelers, and a professional organization, the National Sculpture Society.

The advent of steel frames and reinforced concrete encouraged, at first, more diverse building styles into the 1910s and 1920s. The diversity of skyscraper Gothic, exotic "revivals" of Mayan and Egyptian, Stripped Classicism, Art Deco, etc. called for a similar diversity of sculptural approaches. The use of sculpture was still expected, particularly for public buildings such as war memorials and museums. In 1926 the pre-eminent American architectural sculptor, Lee Lawrie, with his longtime friend and collaborator architect Bertram Goodhue, developed perhaps the most sophisticated American examples at the Nebraska State Capitol and the Los Angeles Public Library.

Goodhue's premature death ended that collaboration. The Depression, and the onset of World War II, decimated building activity. The old building trades disbanded. By the postwar years the aesthetic of architectural modernism had taken hold. Except for a few diehards and regional sculptors, the profession was not only dead but discredited. As of the 2010s there are isolated signs of a revival of interest, for instance in the career of Raymond Kaskey and the Persist statue in Sacramento, California.

== See also ==
- List of architectural sculpture in Westminster
- Pedimental sculptures in Canada
- Pedimental sculptures in the United States
