= Eastern pediment of the Temple of Zeus at Olympia =

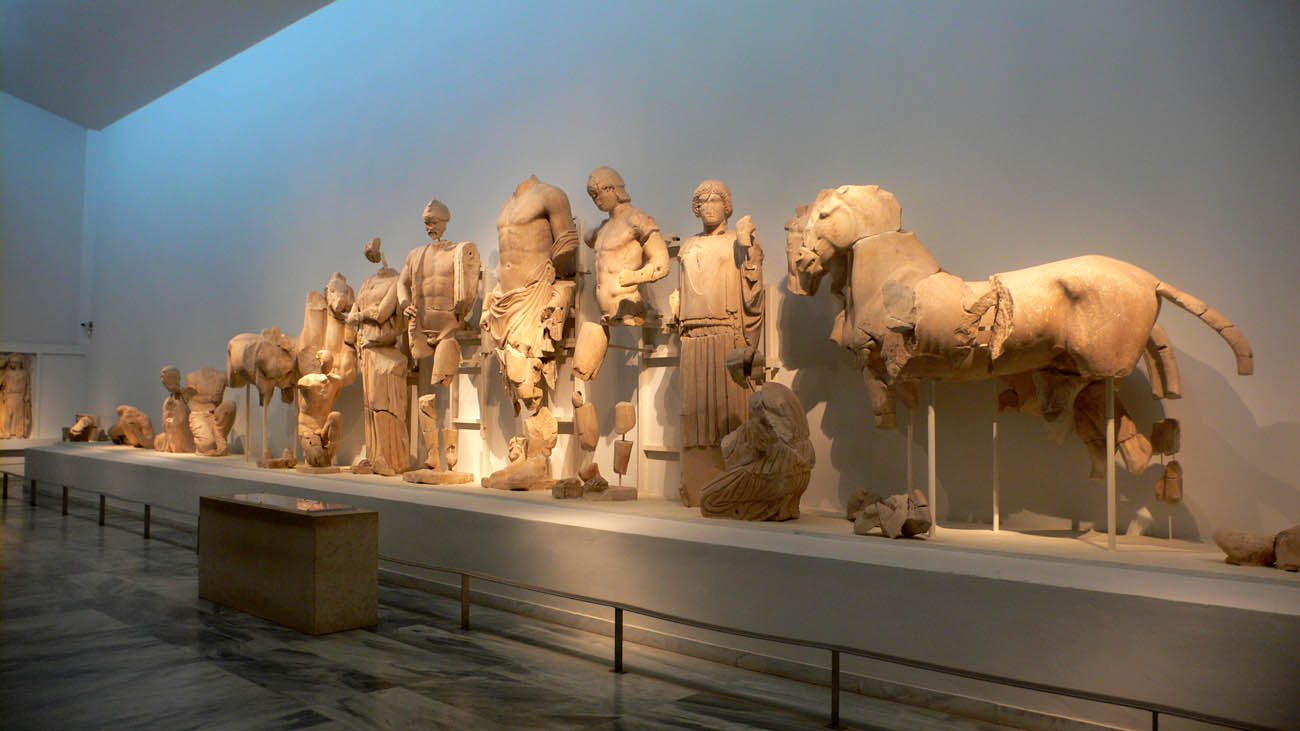
Sculpture from Eastern Pediment

The Eastern pediment of the Temple of Zeus at Olympia depicts the tale of Pelops just before the chariot race wherein he kills the king Oenomaus in order to win the hand of his daughter Hippodamia. The depiction of this chariot race on the east pediment of the Temple of Zeus at Olympia, along with that of the Twelve Labours of Heracles on the metopes of the frieze, relate to the location of the temple in Olympia; the chariot race and Heracles were both believed to have started the tradition of the Olympic Games.

The substantial remains of the pedimental sculptures are now in the Olympia Archaeological Museum.

== Description ==
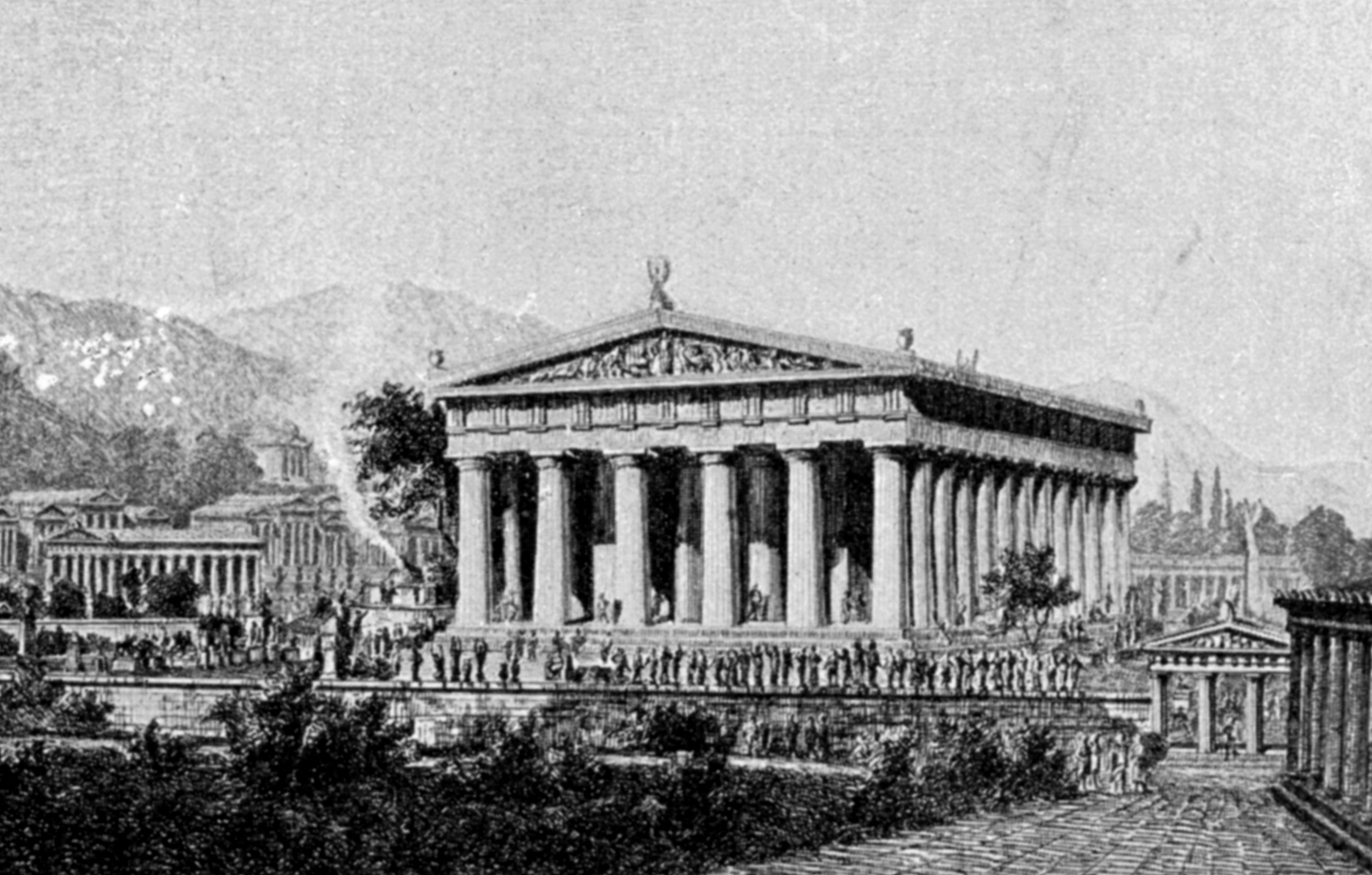
Temple of Zeus at Olympia

In the center stands Zeus watching over Pelops to his right and Oenomaus to his left. Besides Oenomaus stands his wife, Sterope, whereas besides Pelops stands his (future) wife and daughter of Oenomaus and Sterope, Hippodamia; on the sides stand the chariots about to be raced on. In the corners of the pediment are two male figures, personifications of the two rivers that flow through the region, Alfeios and Kladeos.

The old man depicted on the right wing of the pediment, next to Kladeos, remains unidentified. He is speculated to be a seer or a fortuneteller who can predict the catastrophic consequenses that Pelops's unjust win will inflict upon his household and his offspring; because of this, he looks concerned. Our accounts for this myth do not mention an oracle taking place before or during the chariot race. However, it is accepted that the depiction of the pediment relies on a literary account (unknown to us today). Moreover, the statue of the fortuneteller is believed to be the earliest depiction of an aged figure in a realistic and unbeautified manner in Greek art.

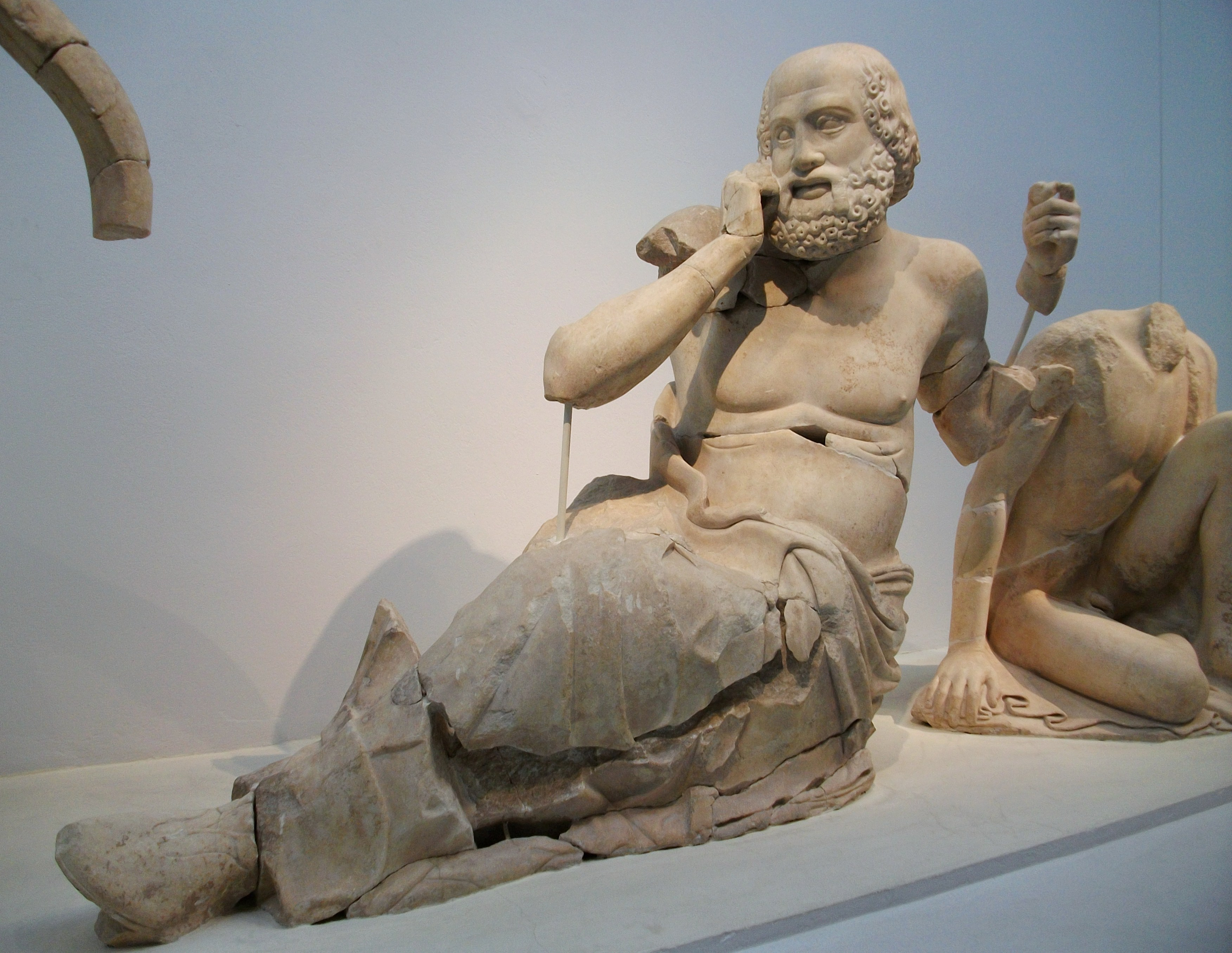
The statue of the fortuneteller

== Location ==
Olympia is in the northwest portion of the Peloponnese. It was a Panhellenic sanctuary, meaning that it was open to all Greeks regardless of the city-state they were a part of. Olympia was also home of the Olympic Games, a Panhellenic athletic tournament occurring every 4 years wherein a sacred truce was declared among the poleis.

== Mythology ==
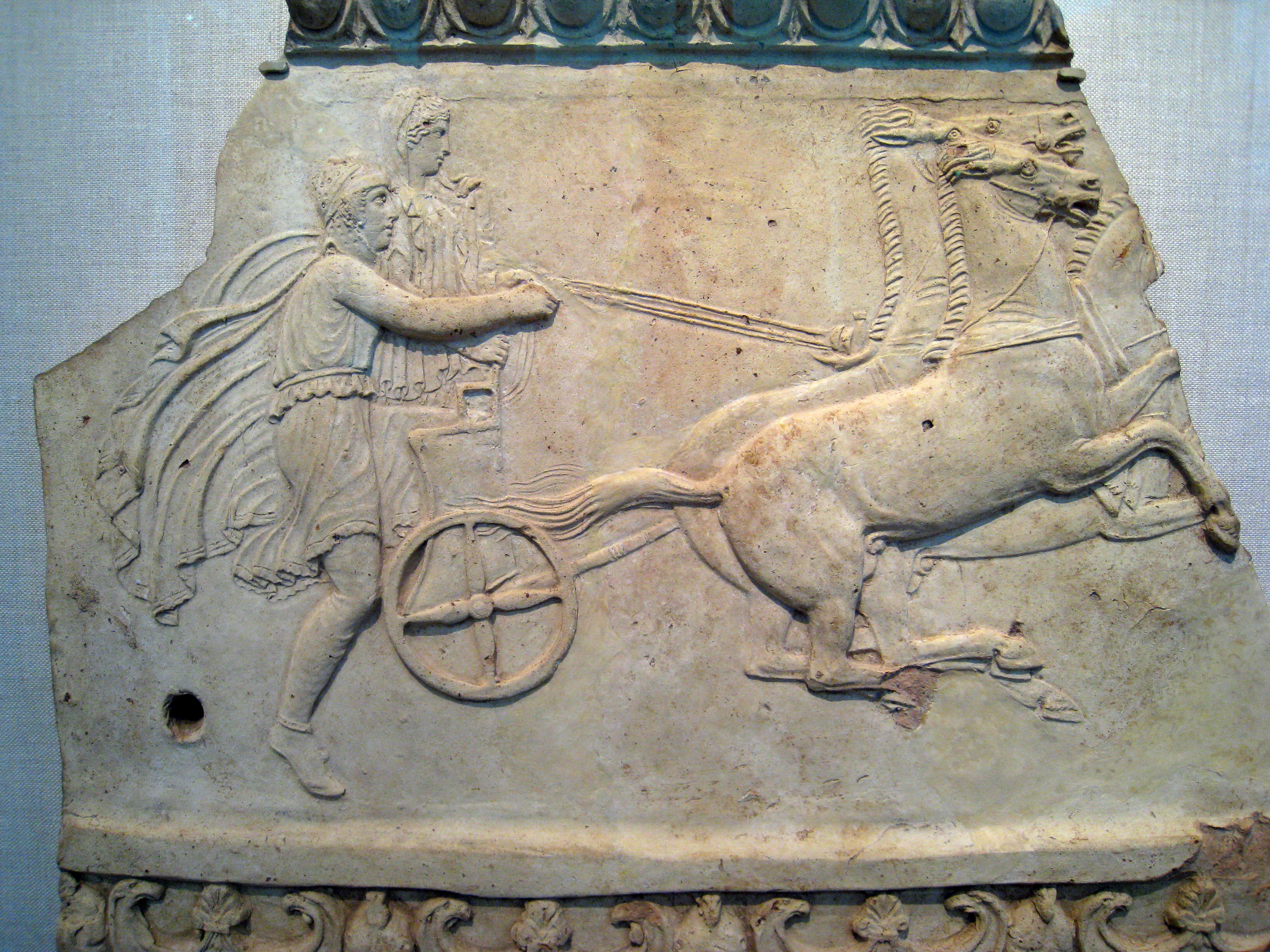
Relief of Pelops's chariot race

In Greek mythology, Pelops had sought to marry Hippodamia. Her father, King Oenomaus, did not want to marry off his daughter, so he challenged each of her suitors to a chariot race. Before Pelops, he had beaten and killed all of these suitors, for he had immortal horses given to him by his father Ares. Pelops, however, called on Poseidon, his former lover, for assistance, and he gave Pelops a gold chariot with winged horses pulling it. Another common view is that Pelops had bribed Oenomaus's charioteer, Myrtilus, into replacing the bronze linchpins of the chariot with ones made of wax. Afterwards, Pelops kills Myrtilus in order to avoid paying the bribe.
