= Pedimental sculptures in Canada =

Pedimental sculpture with the Royal coat of arms of the United Kingdom and acanthus leaves, Rideau Hall, Ottawa, 1914, sculptor David Ewart

Pedimental sculptures are sculptures within the frame of a pediment on the exterior of a building, some examples of which can be found in Canada. Pedimental sculpture poses special challenges to sculptors: the triangular composition limits the choices for figures or ornament at the ends, and the sculpture must be designed to be viewed both from below and from a distance.

== History ==
As with the ancient Greeks, and the Roman architects and sculptors who followed them, North American artists had two different structural approaches creating pedimental sculpture. They are either freestanding statues that stand on the bed (the ledge or cornice that creates the bottom of the pediment), or they can be relief sculpture, attached to the back wall of the pediment.

Compositionally, the restrictions imposed by both the physical triangular shape of a pediment, and the traditional themes that are usually employed for the subject matter, are, according to Ernest Arthur Gardner, "as exactly regulated as that of a sonnet or a Spenserian stanza: the artist has liberty only in certain directions and must not violate the laws of rhythm".

=== The Golden Dog ===
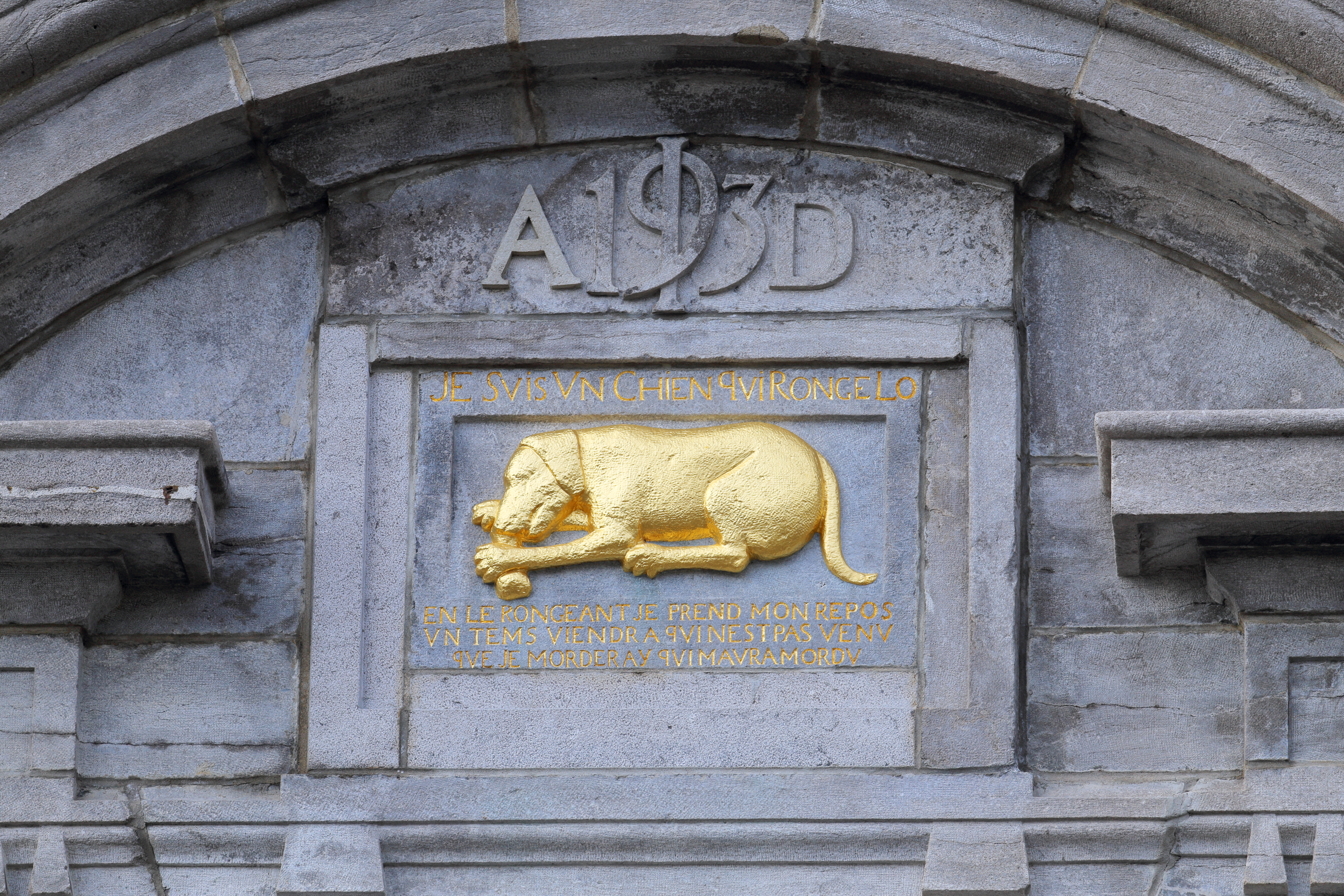
Le Chien d'Or (c.1688), Edifice Louis S. St.-Laurent, Quebec City, in 2020

Perhaps the most famous pedimental sculpture in Quebec is Le Chien d'Or (c.1688) in Quebec City. The gray limestone relief panel depicts a dog gnawing a bone, a metaphor for nursing a grudge.

Timothée Roussel (c.1639-1700), a French immigrant and surgeon, was a Quebec City landowner in New France, and Jean Normand was his neighbor. The two bickered over right of passage across Normand's land, and Roussel won in court over Normand in 1682 and 1683. The men eventually came to blows, and wound up in court again in 1686. The court record noted that Normand's son Joseph had killed Roussel's dog.

Two years later, Roussel built a house on Buade Street, and affixed the bas relief panel over his front door. It featured a menacing inscription:
"I am a dog that gnaws his bone / I couch and gnaw it all alone / A time will come, which is not yet / When I'll bite him by whom I'm bit." (Translation by William Kirby, 1877.)

Merchant Nicolas Jacquin, dit Philibert bought the house from Roussel's heirs in 1734, and greatly expanded it. The merchant was murdered in 1748. Philibert's house was later converted into a coffeehouse, was the meeting place for Freemasons from 1775 to 1800, and served as the city's post office from 1845 to 1871. The house was demolished for construction of a large Second Empire post office building, completed in 1872. Roussel's panel was mounted high above its side entrance.

Author William Kirby made the relief panel the centerpiece of his 1877 historical novel The Golden Dog. The lead character was Philibert's son, who tracks down his father's killer and avenges the murder. The novel helped to make Le Chien d'Or famous, but also popularized the urban legend that the relief panel was erected as a threat to Philibert's murderer.

The post office building was expanded and remodeled in a Beaux-Arts style in 1913. The then-225-year-old relief was relocated to a more prominent location, a segmental pediment over the building's new entrance porch.

=== Manitoba Legislative Building ===
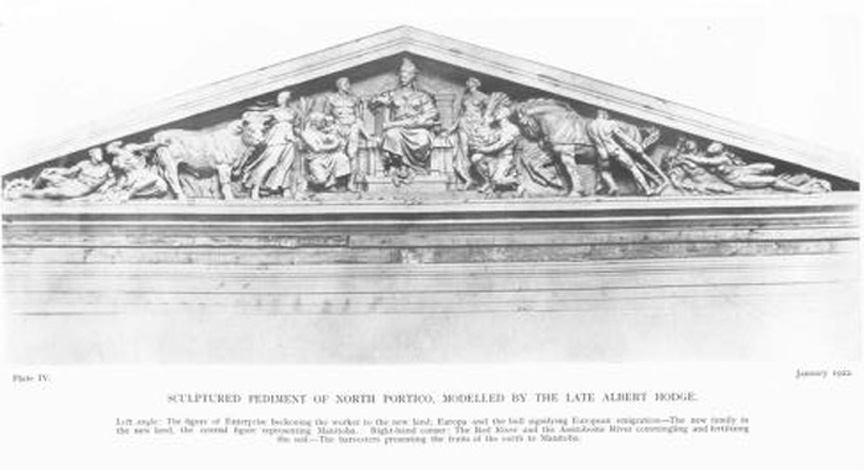
Manitoba Pediment (1921), Manitoba Legislative Building, Winnipeg, Albert Hodge, sculptor

The 1911-1912 British-Empire-wide design competition for the Manitoba Legislative Building in Winnipeg had 67 entrants, and was won by Scottish architect Frank Worthington Simon. He chose Scottish sculptor Albert Hodge to design its sculptured main pediment. Hodge died in 1918 at age 42, three years prior to the building's completion. Piccirilli Brothers of New York City carved Hodge's pedimental figures in limestone.

The pediment group which was modelled by the late Albert Hodge, of London, attracts attention first by its conspicuous situation as well as by its artistic quality. In judging such a group it must be borne in mind that the height above the eye, its peculiar confining frame and the necessities of its composition make it one of the most difficult of sculptural problems. Mr. Hodge, however, has most successfully developed his subject, filling the outer acute angles of the pediment as well as the high apex, the composition being balanced on either side and culminating at the centre. The female figure of Manitoba sits full front in the middle, and to the left there are three distinct groups, connected and related to the central figure by sentiment and gesture. In the corner Enterprise beckons the workers to the Land of Promise. Next there is a finely modelled bull led by Europa typifying the emigration from Europe, and between this group and Manitoba, there are a father, mother and child—the new family in the new world. On the opposite side of the angle are two figures clasping a jar whence issues a stream of water fertilizing the earth—the confluence of the Red and Assiniboine rivers. Next is a group of ploughmen and horses, tilling the soil, balancing the Bull-and-Europa group. Between these and Manitoba is a group of a man and a woman bringing the fruits of the soil, balancing the family group. Thus are expressions and balance complete, scale maintained, and the space well filled.
Mr. Hodge's work is also seen in the two sphinxes, representing Wisdom and Knowledge, placed on either side of the main pediment, and in the group of two figures, personifying, respectively, Peace and War, above the east and west pediments.

== Pedimental sculptures ==
Building	Province	Location	Image	Sculpture	Sculptor	Architect	Installed	Medium / Notes
Alberta Legislature Building	Alberta	Edmonton; 10800 97 Avenue NW		central crest incorporating provincial shield	tbd	Allan Merrick Jeffers and Richard Blakey	1913	Alberta Legislative Building:
Bank of Montreal, Calgary branch	Alberta	Calgary; 8th Avenue and 1st Street SW		version of the bank's coat of arms	tbd	Kenneth Rea	1932	Listed on the Canadian Register of Historic Places
Merchants' Bank of Canada, Victoria branch	British Columbia	Victoria; 1225 Douglas Street		Bank of Montreal coat of arms	tbd	Francis M. Rattenbury, architect Honeyman & Curtis, 1922 expansion	1907 1922	Built by the Merchants' Bank of Canada in 1907. Bank of Montreal purchased the building in 1922, and expanded it, adding a pedimental sculpture of the BOM coat of arms. Listed on the Canadian Register of Historic Places
Manitoba Legislative Building	Manitoba	Winnipeg; 450 Broadway		enthroned central figure of Manitoba, figures representing the Red River and the Assiniboine River at far right	Albert Hodge, sculptor Piccirilli Brothers (New York City), carvers	Frank Worthington Simon and Septimus Warwick	1920	Manitoba Legislative Building: Listed on the Canadian Register of Historic Places
Winnipeg Law Courts Building	Manitoba	Winnipeg; 391 Broadway		blindfolded Justice with sword and scales, flanked by two figures	tbd	Victor W. Horwood	1916	Horwood (1878–1939) was provincial government architect Pediment sculpture commission was won by open competition Listed on the Canadian Register of Historic Places
New Brunswick Legislative Building	New Brunswick	Fredericton; 706 Queen Street		central shield	unknown	James C. Dumaresq	1882	Listed on the Canadian Register of Historic Places
Colonial Building	Newfoundland and Labrador	St. John's; Military Road		lion and unicorn, in a version of the Royal coat of arms of the United Kingdom	unknown	James Purcell	1847	Colonial Building: Listed on the Canadian Register of Historic Places
Bank of Montreal, Sydney branch	Nova Scotia	Sydney; 175 Charlotte Street		central shield	tbd	Sir Andrew Taylor	1901	Twin pediments on north and west facades, carved from olive green sandstone Listed on the Canadian Register of Historic Places
Province House	Nova Scotia	Halifax; 1726 Hollis Street		lion and unicorn, in a version of the Royal coat of arms of the United Kingdom	unknown	John Merrick	1819	Province House: Listed on the Canadian Register of Historic Places
Bank of Montreal, Cambridge branch	Ontario	Cambridge (Galt); 44 Main Street (at Water)		central shield in low relief	tbd	Hogel & Davis	1919	Built by the Merchants' Bank of Canada
Bank of Montreal, Hamilton branch	Ontario	Hamilton; James and Main		Bank of Montreal coat of arms	tbd	Kenneth G. Rea	1928	Listed on the Canadian Register of Historic Places
Rideau Hall (Government House)	Ontario	Ottawa; 1 Sussex Drive		lion and unicorn, in a version of the Royal coat of arms of the United Kingdom	tbd	David Ewart, 1914 expansion	1838; 1865-1868; 1914	Rideau Hall: Pediments not original construction, date from 1914 construction of Mappin Hall; Listed on the Canadian Register of Historic Places
St. Lawrence Hall	Ontario	Toronto; 157 King Street east		depiction of former coat of arms of Toronto	John Cochrane and brothers	William Thomas	1851	St. Lawrence Hall: Listed on the Canadian Register of Historic Places
Ancienne Banque de Montréal	Quebec	Gatineau; 40 promenade du Portage		Curved fragmental pediment with Bank of Montreal coat of arms		Edward and William Sutherland Maxwell	1907	Listed on the Canadian Register of Historic Places
Ancienne-Douane (old customs house)	Quebec	Montréal; 150, rue Saint-Paul Ouest / place Royale		Albion, representing Great Britain, solitary female figure with trident and shield	unknown	John Ostell	1836	Old Customs House: current statue replaces wooden original; Listed on the Canadian Register of Historic Places
Bank of Montreal Head Office	Quebec	Montreal; 119, rue Saint-Jacques		Bank of Montreal coat of arms: two First Nations figures flank a seal with motto Concordia salus (here with two European pioneers)	Sir John Steell	John Wells	1847	Bank of Montreal Main Office
Bonsecours Market	Quebec	Montreal; 350, Rue Saint-Paul		abstract design	tbd	William Footner	1847	Listed on the Canadian Register of Historic Places
Le Chien d'Or; The Golden Dog	Quebec	Quebec City; Louis S. St.-Laurents Building, 3, Rue De Buade		gold-painted limestone relief panel of a dog gnawing a bone	unknown	Pierre Gauvreau, builder	1688 (sculpture); 1872 (building); 1913 (expansion)	North facade (relief panel is center, below the entrance porch's flag): Listed on the Canadian Register of Historic Places
London and Lancashire Life Building	Quebec	Montreal; 244, rue Saint-Jacques		several minor ornate pediments on main and flanking facades	unknown	Edward Maxwell	1898	London and Lancashire Life Building, c.1895:
Maisonneuve Municipal Library (Bibliothèque Maisonneuve)	Quebec	Montreal; 4120 Ontario Street East		central seal with inscription	tbd	Cajetan Dufort	1910-1912	Formerly, Maisonneuve City Hall: (l'Hôtel de Ville de Maisonneuve)
Maisonneuve Public Bath and Gymnasium	Quebec	Montreal; 1875–1877, Morgan boulevard, Borough Mercier-Hochelaga-Maisonneuve		blind pediment, with figural acroteria	Arthur Dubord	Marius Dufresne	1916	Later called "Bain Morgan"
Montreal Masonic Memorial Temple	Quebec	Montreal; 2295 Saint-Marc Street and 1805 Sherbrooke Street West		two caped male athletes flank a coat of arms with signs of the Four Evangelists	tbd	John Smith Archibald	1929	Montreal Memorial Masonic Temple: Listed on the Canadian Register of Historic Places
Ravenscrag, Hugh Allan Residence	Quebec	Montreal; 835-1025 Avenue des Pins Ouest		coat of arms (motto Spero), scrollwork and foliation carved in deep open-bed pediment	unknown	Victor Roy and John W. Hopkins	1863	Segmental pediment dormer:
Rialto Theatre	Quebec	Montreal; 5723, avenue du Parc		a pair of segmental pediments with escutcheons	unknown	Joseph-Raoul Gariépy	1924	Rialto Theatre: Listed on the Canadian Register of Historic Places
Saint-Joseph du Mont-Royal	Quebec	Montréal; 3800, chenin Queen Mary		escutcheon flanked by palm branches		Paul Bellot	1937-1941	Listed on the Canadian Register of Historic Places
Prince Edward Building	Saskatchewan	Regina; Scarth Street and 11th Avenue		minor segmental pediments over 3rd story, and triangular pediments over 4th story, contain abstract carving	unknown	David Ewart	1907	aka Old Post Office
Saskatchewan Legislative Building	Saskatchewan	Regina; 2405 Legislative Drive		Center: Enthroned figure of Canada; Left: Seated Aboriginal, his wife and infant, tools and handicrafts Right: Seated settler, his wife and 2 children, cow, sheep and plow	Canadian members of the Bromsgrove Guild of Applied Arts	Edward and William Sutherland Maxwell	1912	Saskatchewan Legislative Building: Listed on the Canadian Register of Historic Places

== See also ==
- Architecture of Canada
- Pedimental sculpture
- Pedimental sculptures in the United States
