= Pedimental sculpture =

Sculptures designed for architectural pediments

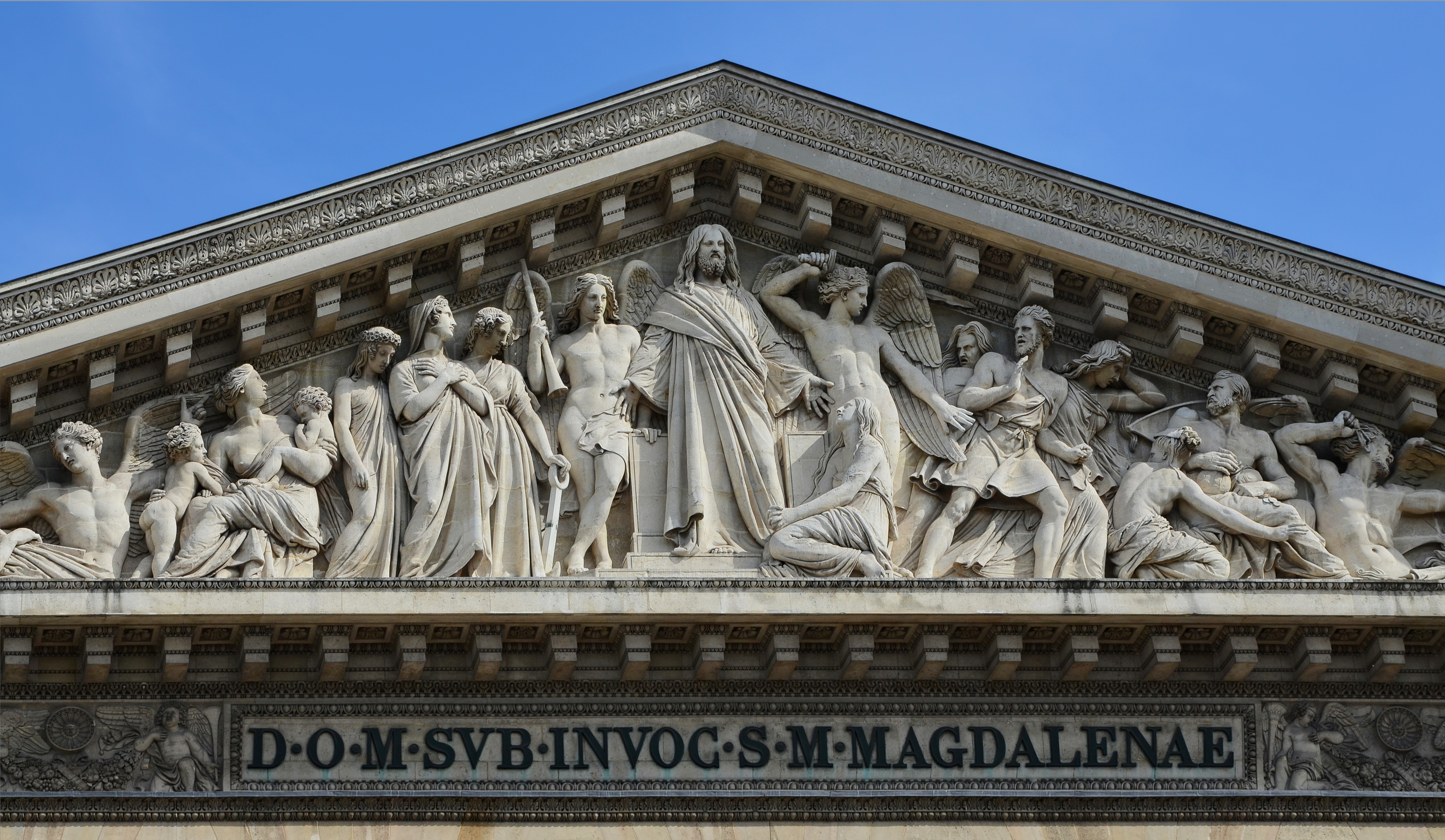
Neoclassical pediment of La Madeleine Church, Paris, with sculpture (1826–1834) by Philippe Joseph Henri Lemaire

Pedimental sculpture is a form of architectural sculpture designed for installation in the tympanum, the space enclosed by the architectural element called the pediment. Originally a feature of Ancient Greek architecture, pedimental sculpture started as a means to decorate a pediment in its simplest form: a low triangle, like a gable, above an horizontal base or entablature. However, as classical architecture developed from the basis of Ancient Greek and Roman architecture, the varieties of pedimental sculpture also developed. The sculpture can be either freestanding or relief sculpture, in which case it is attached to the back wall of the pediment. Harris in The Illustrated Dictionary of Historic Architecture defines pediment as "In classical architecture, the triangular gable end of the roof above the horizontal cornice, often filled with sculpture." Pediments can also be used to crown doors or windows.

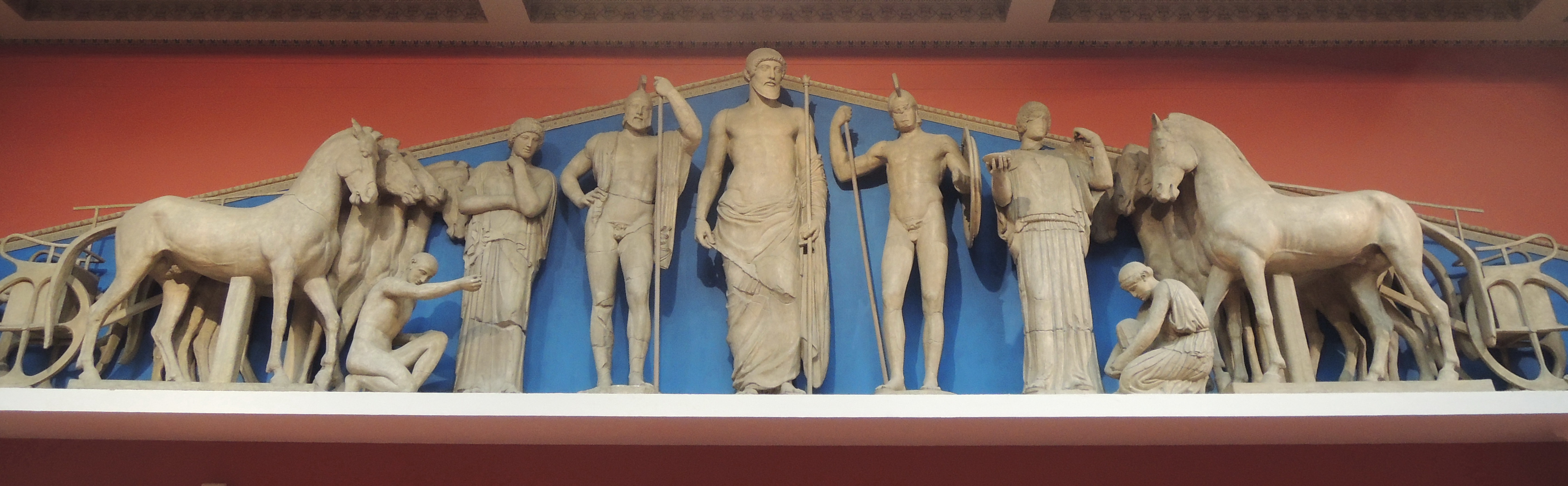
Reconstruction, including casts, of the East pediment of the Temple of Zeus, Olympia, c. 460 BCE, Pushkin Museum, Moscow

In Romanesque architecture, and very often in Gothic architecture, the tympanum is usually semi-circular at the top, and the sculptural groups, usually with religious subjects, adapted to fit the new spaces. In the Renaissance triangular pediments returned, as gradually did sculptural groups within them, becoming very popular for important buildings in the 19th century.

== History ==
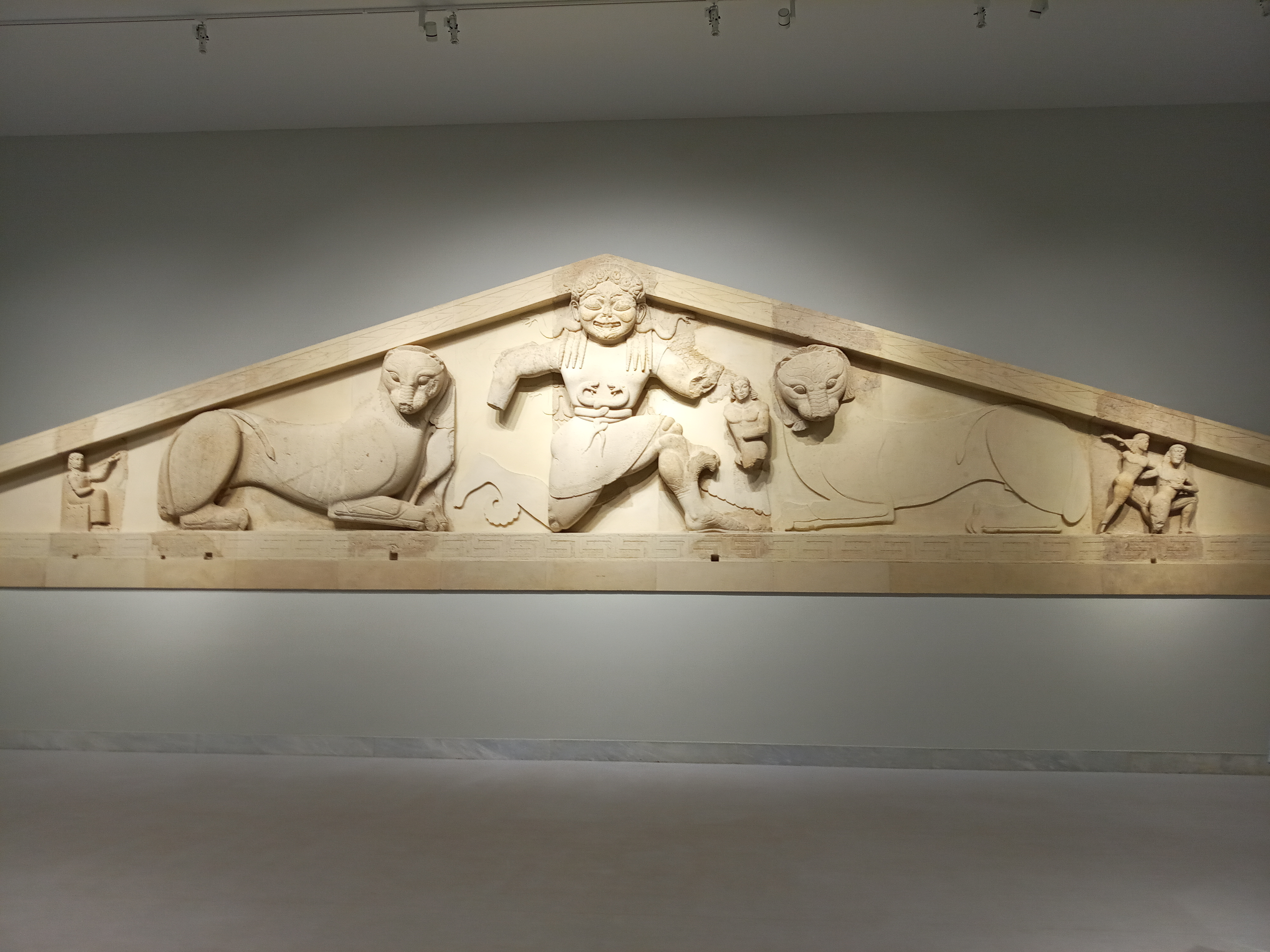
The "earliest pedimental composition to have survived," from the Early Archaic Period, from the Temple of Artemis, Corfu, about 580–570 BCE, now Archaeological Museum of Corfu.

=== Ancient Greek architecture ===
The pediment begins in Ancient Greek architecture; according to the mid-fifth century BCE poet Pindar, it was a Corinthian invention. It is possible that it was devised specifically to contain sculpture, which from the early 6th century became "customary (though never obligatory)" in Doric temples; in Ionic ones it was a "rarity". A difference between the ancient Greek temple and temples of other, older, cultures of the Near East was that the visual effect and decoration of the exterior exceeded that of the interiors and exteriors behind the main facade. Like the other forms of exterior decoration such as statues, antefixes, and acroteria, the pedimental sculptures were originally in terracotta and coloured.

The "earliest pedimental composition to have survived," from the Early Archaic Period, was from the Temple of Artemis, Corfu, about 580–570 BCE. Large parts of the sculptural group are in the Archaeological Museum of Corfu, including the central figure of the winged gorgon Medusa, flanked by two crouching lions. Richter points out that the "weak points are the lack of concerted action and unity as well as the ludicrously small scale of the side figures compared with the central Gorgon."

Gorgons and gorgon heads were the most common early pedimental sculptures, as an architectural version of the gorgoneion apotropaic amulet, which both Athena and Zeus are said to have worn as a pendant. Greek temples with pediment sculptures usually had them at both ends of the temple, and tended to have contrasting scenes, one perhaps a peaceful scene with deities, and the other with a battle or dramatic scene from mythology.

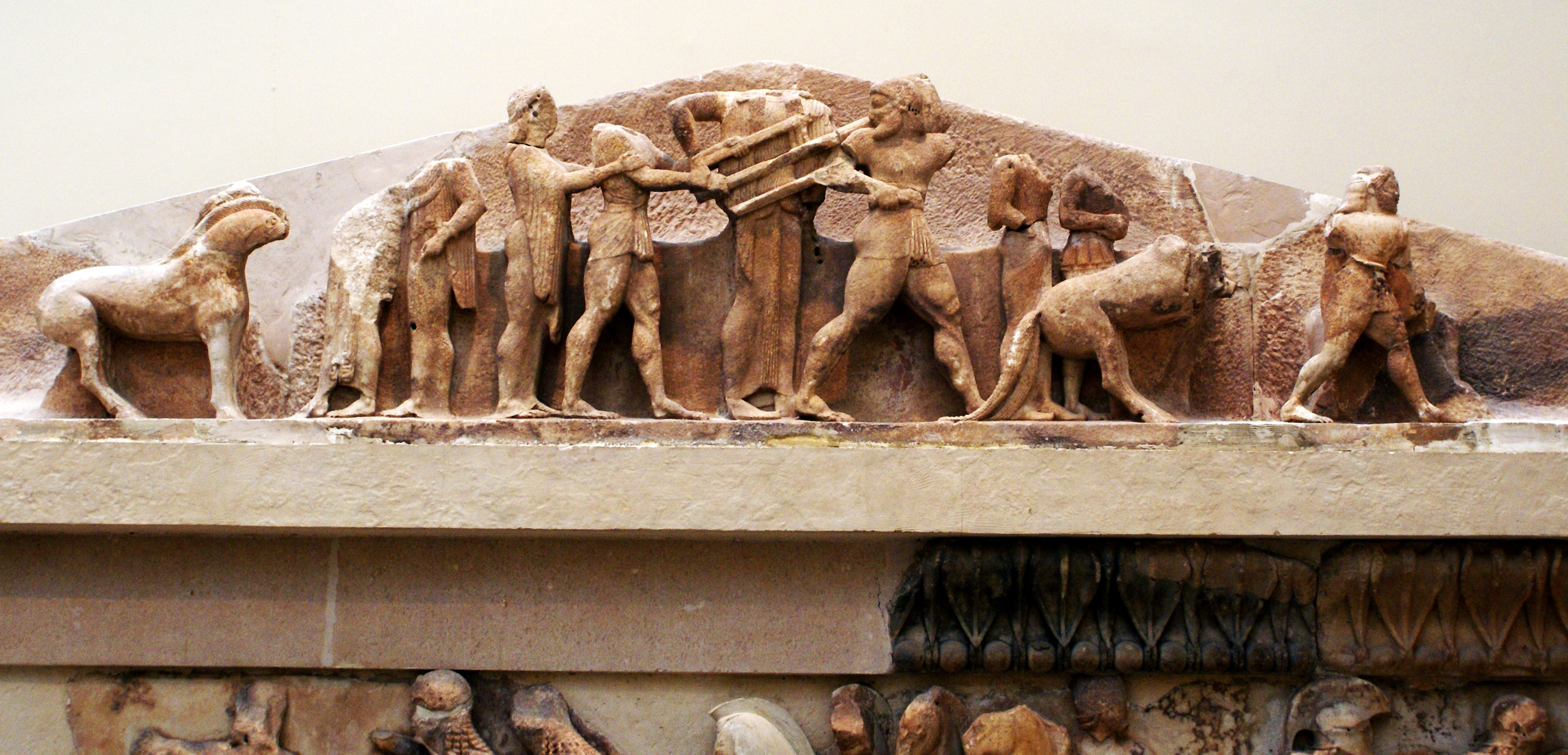
Apollo struggling with Heracles, Siphnian Treasury at Delphi (about 525 BCE)

Over the next decades refinements were made in the design and carving of pedimental sculpture, the small "Hydra pediment" in Athens (about 570 BCE), the "Bluebeard pediment from the 'old Athena temple' the Siphnian Treasury at Delphi (about 525 BCE), the Megarian Treasury at Olympia (about 520–510 BCE), the temple to Aphaia at Aigina (about 500–480 BCE), the Temple of Zeus at Olympia (about 465–460 BCE, the remains of the Eastern pediment of the Temple of Zeus at Olympia are in the site museum) and others, but "they did not satisfy the Greek sculptor for long." Finally, in the Parthenon pediments (about 438–432) "we reach the climax of Greek pedimental composition". After the Parthenon there is no outstanding pedimental composition, at least now known.

In the late or Hellenistic phase of Etruscan art, after about 300 BCE, Greek-style groups were introduced, but in terracotta rather than stone; some large fragments of these have survived. The Romans also used terracotta, but also stone for the grandest temples. An Amazonomachy in marble on the Temple of Apollo Sosianus in Rome, whose fragments were excavated in the 1930s, is thought to be a Greek work of the 5th century BCE, removed by the Romans from a temple there in the 1st century CE. Allusions to the recent Battle of Actium have been proposed. The group on the final rebuilding of the Capitoline Temple of Jupiter Optimus Maximus is known from literary descriptions and depictions in other works of art, but none of it is known to survive.

==== The Parthenon ====
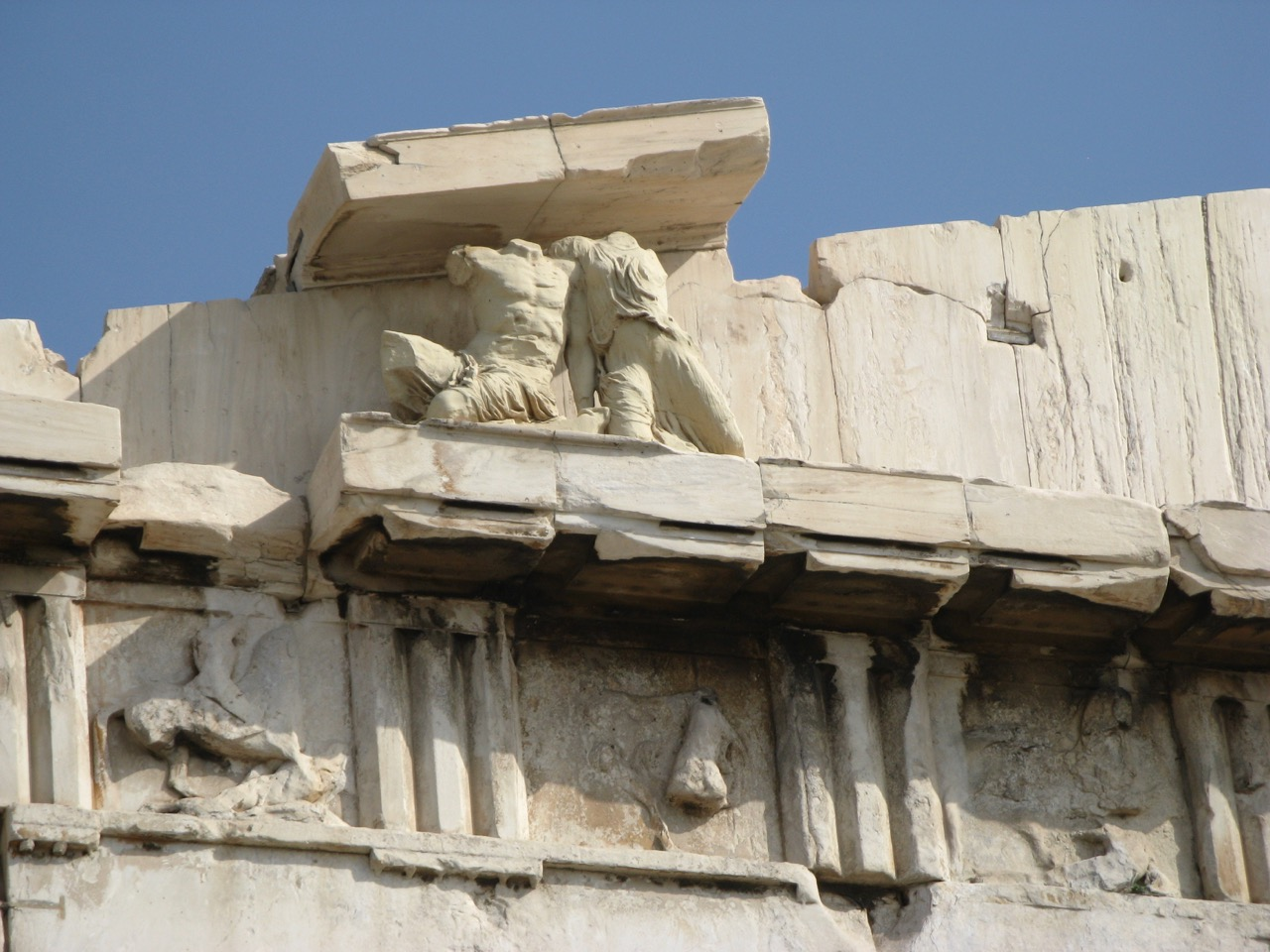
Triglyphs and metopes in place on the west pediment; the 3rd and 4th figures from the left below.

The Parthenon's west pediment depicted the contest between Athena and Poseidon over Attica and the east pediment the birth of Athena. Classical archeologists since Johann Joachim Winckelmann's Geschichte der Kunst des Alterthums (published 1764) have recognized Greek pediment sculpture, in particular the pediments of the Parthenon, as the standard of the highest-quality art in antiquity. For Martin Schede, writing in 1923, the remains of limestone pediments, although "badly shattered indeed," represented "the highest artistic achievement of two generations of a most artistic people," the value of which was impossible to overestimate. The travel writer Solomon Charles Kaines Smith specifically named the "Three Fates" of the east pediment the "highest surviving achievement of Greek sculpture," and for Wincklemann's contemporary Ennio Quirino Visconti the Parthenon pediments "met the criteria for the best artists of the best period." The Parthenon compositions are considered to be the magnum opus of Classical pedimental decoration.

Awareness of the Parthenon pediments, almost the only classical example to substantially survive in situ to the Renaissance, and eventually highly influential, increased only gradually in Western Europe. They were first drawn, not accurately, in 1436 by Ciriaco de' Pizzicolli. It grew significantly over the 17th century, especially as numerous careful drawings were made in Athens in 1674 by Jacques Carrey, a member of Charles Le Brun's workshop, who was sent in the suite of Charles Marie François Olier, marquis de Nointel, the French ambassador to Constantinople to make drawings. These were made before the sculptures were greatly damaged in an explosion in 1687. The drawings had all reached Paris by Carrey's return in 1679, and contain crucial evidence as to the original appearance of the portions that were destroyed.

The British Museum holds 17 figurative pedimental sculptures from the Parthenon, as part of the so-called Elgin Marbles, in their permanent collection. The rest of the pedimental sculpture from the Parthenon is now on display in the Acropolis Museum at Athens.

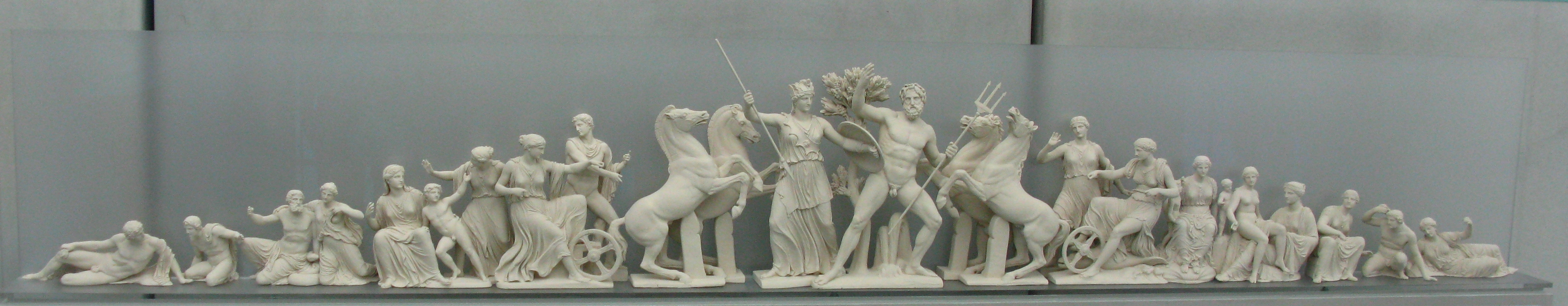
Reconstruction of the sculptures on the west pediment of the Parthenon; the quarrel between Athena and Poseidon to be the tutelary deity of Athens.

=== Post-classical ===
Sculptures above lintels continued to be produced, indeed became more common, in post-classical architectural styles, but in recent times the medieval examples tend not to be called "pedimental sculptures", although it is technically correct to do so. "Tympanum reliefs" is a more common term, as these are now mostly in a relatively low relief, and less than life-size, as they are lower down the building, over doorways, and so closer to the observer than on classical temples. They are typically framed by round tops in Romanesque architecture, and pointed Gothic arch shapes in Gothic architecture. In both cases the composition was often arranged in tiers, with many small figures making up a Christian scene, sometimes dominated by a much larger Christ in Majesty or a Virgin Mary. There are often supporting figures on the archivolts to the sides, and on the lintel below.

==== Renaissance and Baroque ====
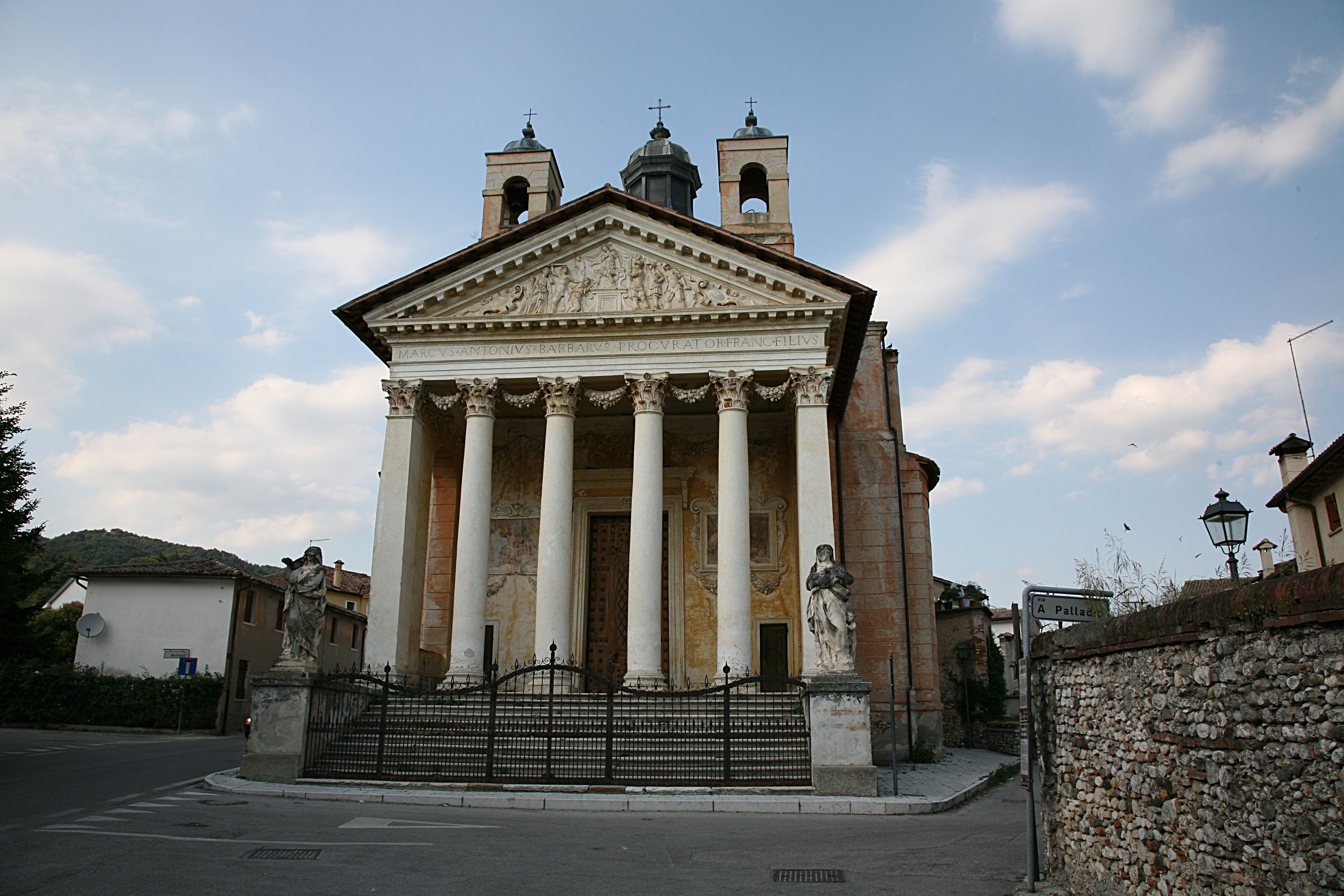
Andrea Palladio's Tempietto Barbaro (c. 1583)

The low triangular pediment was revived, initially mainly for the main facade of churches, in Renaissance architecture, but at first the triangular tympanum was left plain or only decorated with a round window, or sometimes a round motif such as a star. The cathedral at Pienza (c. 1460), with the coat of arms of Pope Pius II is one of the earliest examples to feature the arms of the donor of the church. This became common by the next century, as at Saint Peter's Basilica and the Church of the Gesù (completed 1584), both in Rome. Heraldic sculpture was to remain extremely common in tympani, especially as the triangular pediment spread to large houses.

Most buildings with pediments by Andrea Palladio followed the simpler formulae, but some of his villas around the Veneto feature large sprawling figures supporting the coat of arms, so that most of the tympanum is filled. Examples are the Villa Barbaro (completed c. 1558) and Villa Emo (by 1561). The small Tempietto Barbaro near the villa (c. 1583) has a composition in stucco with eight figures filling the space; like some other examples this seems to have been added after the rest of the building was finished, and the designer and sculptor are unknown.

Such compositions remained uncommon in Baroque architecture, even in the grandest buildings, and somewhat unexpectedly are found more often north of the Alps, with many in Protestant countries. Examples include crowded scenes, all in relief, at Saint Paul's Cathedral (Conversion of Saint Paul), the south front of Hampton Court Palace (Hercules Triumphing Over Envy, by Caius Cibber), both buildings by Christopher Wren, and the Royal Palace of Amsterdam (1655, built as the City Hall). The expansion of the Louvre Palace under Louis XIV included much pedimental sculpture filling various shapes of tympanum. Buildings with military connections could surround heraldic devices with trophies of arms and armour to fill the whole space, as at Blenheim Palace and many Central European palaces, such as Nieborów Palace (on both fronts, in stucco). Otherwise, flanking angels or winged Victory figures, strapwork or other ornamental motifs, could fill the rest of the triangle.

Heraldic sculptures

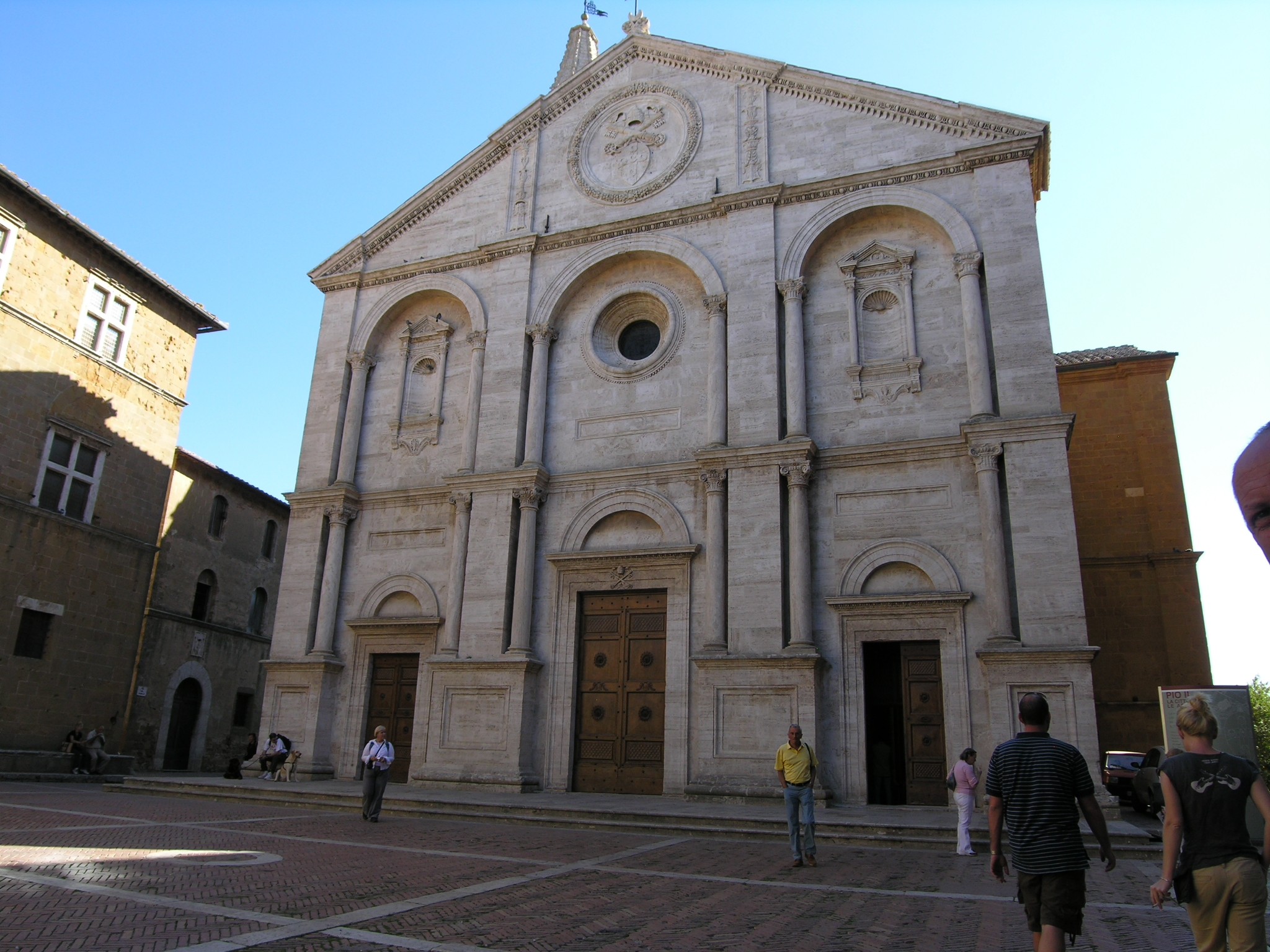
Cathedral at Pienza (c. 1460), with the coat of arms of Pope Pius II

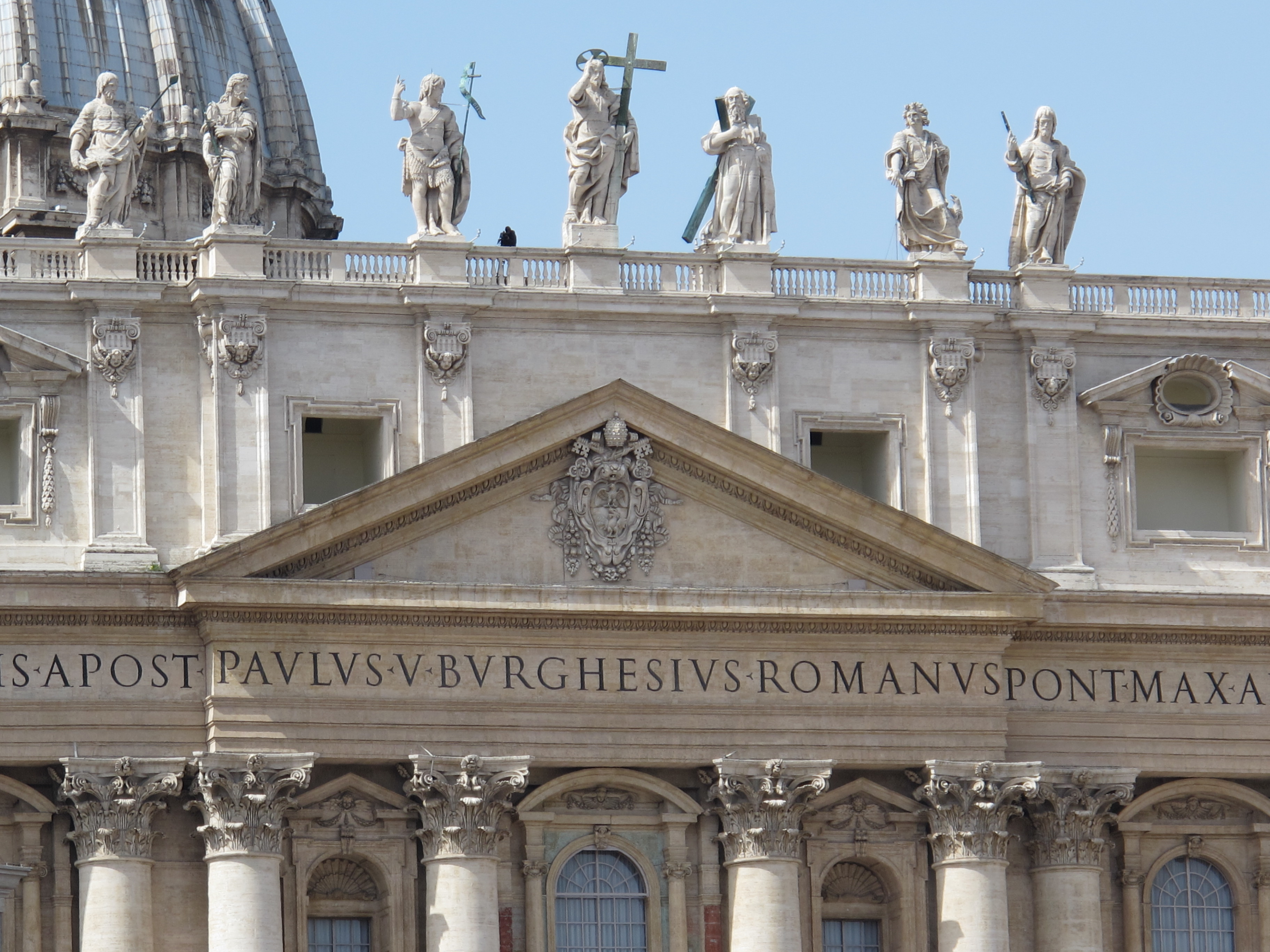
Saint Peter's Basilica, Borghese arms of Pope Paul IV, 1550s

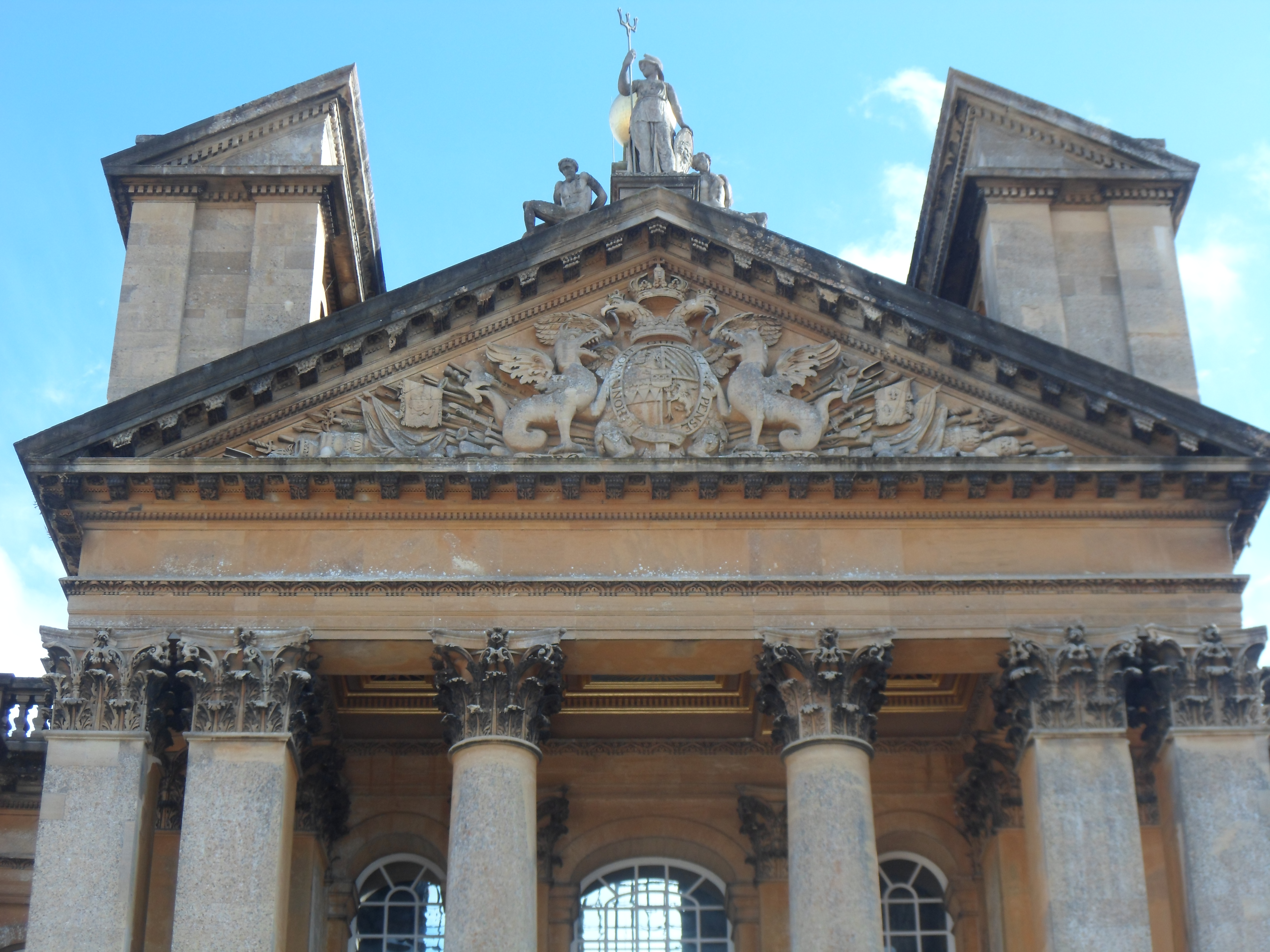
Blenheim Palace, 1710s, with trophies of arms.

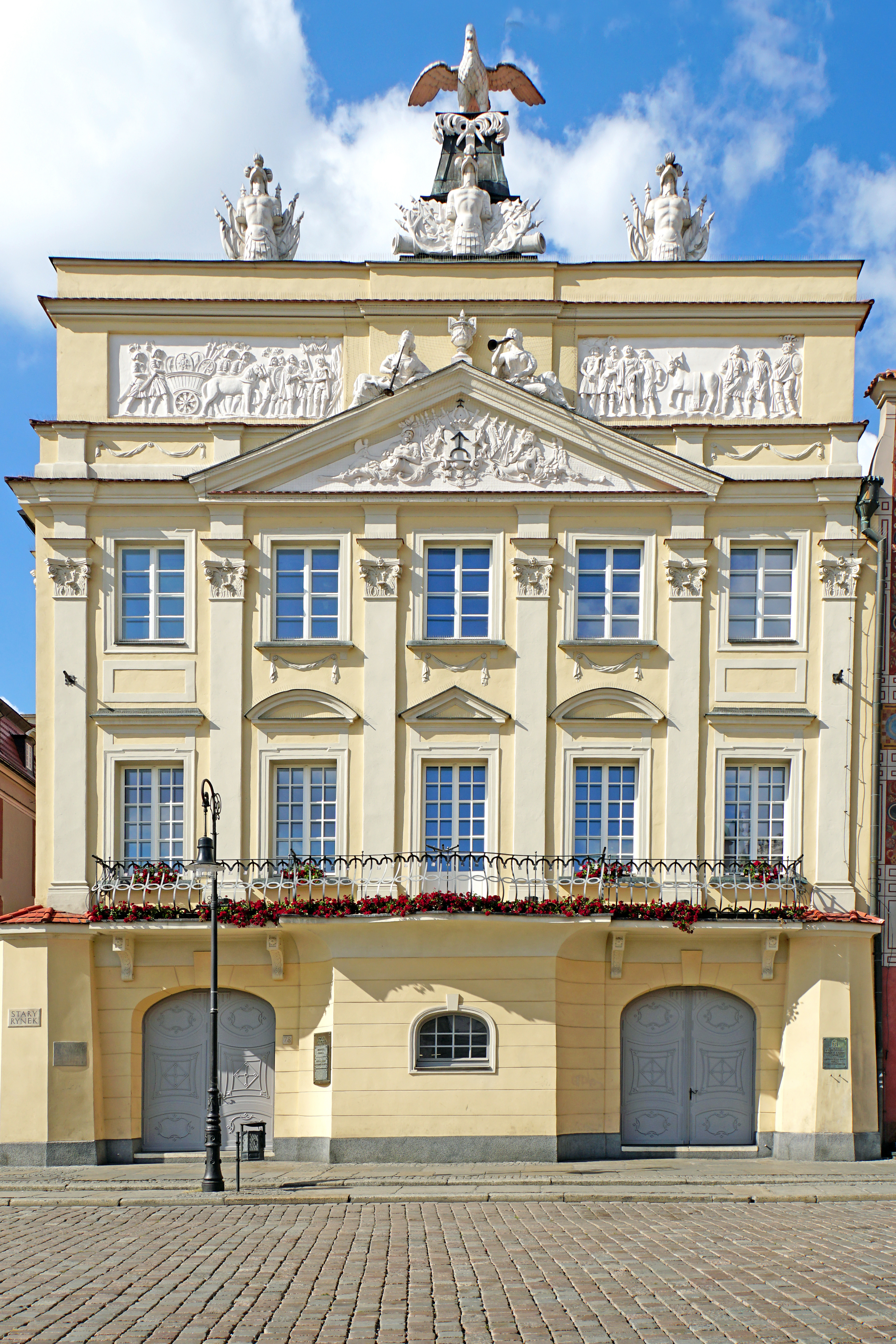
Działyński Palace, Poznań, Poland, 1773 - 1776

==== Neoclassicism ====
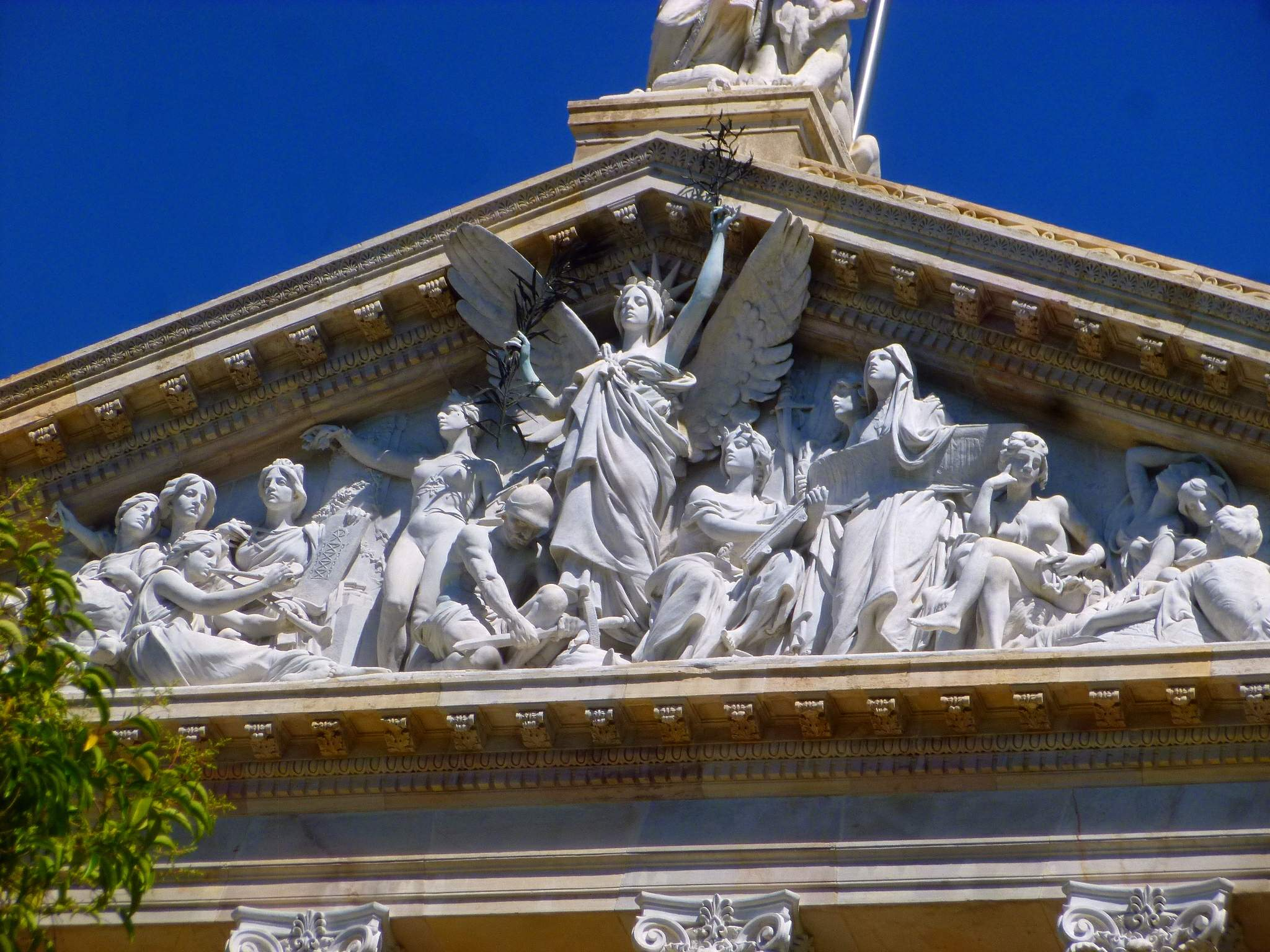
Facade of Biblioteca Nacional de España, Madrid, pediment sculpture by Agustí Querol Subirats, 1892–1903

The arrival of Neoclassical architecture favoured the return of large free-standing figure compositions in the pediments of important buildings, with Vilnius Cathedral (by 1783) one of the earliest in the style. They remained popular during the 19th century, now used for additional types of buildings such as museums, stock exchanges, legislature buildings, law courts, banks and town halls. Allegorical groups became typical on secular buildings. The pediment over the main entrance of the British Museum has The Progress of Civilisation by Sir Richard Westmacott, consisting of fifteen figures, installed in 1852, well after the main building. Westmacott's son sculpted the comparable pediment of the Royal Exchange, London; like the later New York Stock Exchange Building (1903), this featured an allegory of commerce. The group on the Panthéon in Paris was changed three times over its first 50 years, varying between religious and patriotic subjects as the political wind changed.

By 1874, perhaps the most ambitious example in size and in the number of figures was that by Philippe Joseph Henri Lemaire for the La Madeleine Church in Paris. It represents the Last Judgement, with Jesus Christ in the centre, and was completed between 1826 and 1834; it is 125 ft (38 m) in length, and 23 ft (7.0 m) tall at its apex.

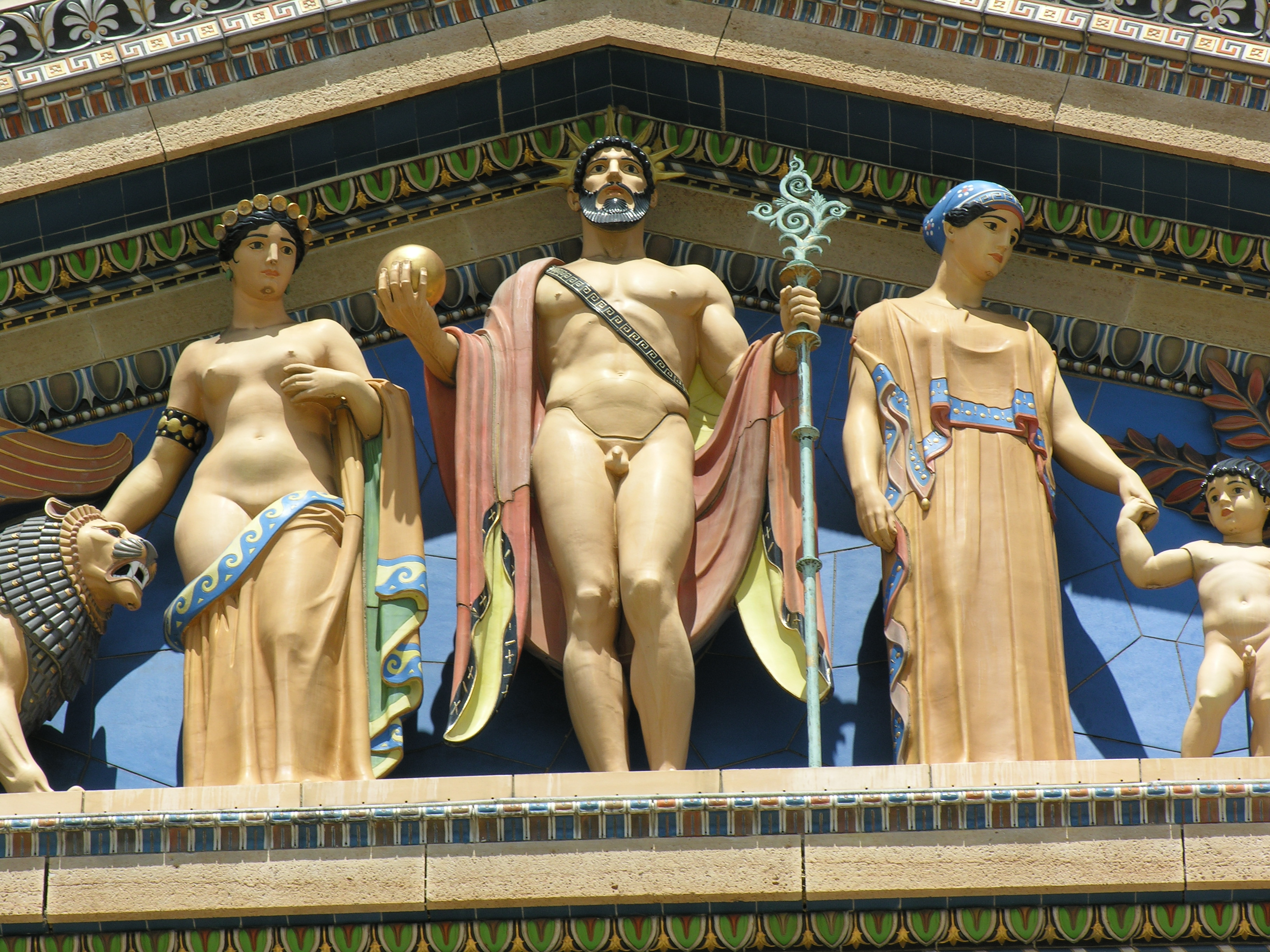
Group in polychrome terracotta, Philadelphia Museum of Art, sculptor C. Paul Jennewein, 1933

In the United States, many government buildings in Washington DC carry large groups, as well as numerous State Capitols and important courthouses. Drafting the Declaration of Independence on the Jefferson Memorial, by Adolph Alexander Weinman (1943) is an exception to the usual allegorical subject matter, showing the Committee of Five around a table. Since World War II relatively few new groups have been created.

Architectural terracotta was sometimes used, as at the department store Harrods in London (glazed, by Royal Doulton), and (in polychrome) at the Philadelphia Museum of Art in the 1930s. The Victoria and Albert Museum has a mosaic group, for which there are medieval Italian precedents.

== Format ==
Gisela Richter, in The Sculpture and Sculptors of the Greeks, states that, "pediment groups presented peculiar difficulties. The chief requirements were: to place in the center a prominent figure or group, since here comes the chief accent; to fill the awkward space of the angles; and to compose figures for the intervening parts of constantly diminishing heights. And the composition as a whole had to produce the needed variety of line and create a harmonious effect. The gradual evolution from primitive renderings to the wonderful solutions of the Parthenon are fascinating to watch."

The sculptures themselves may be freestanding, in-the-round statues that stand on the bed of the pediment, or they can be relief sculpture, attached to its back wall. As an additional physical restriction in the pediment format, a deeper recess will throw the triangular field into deeper shadow, which means the figures should be executed in deeper relief or fully in the round. Only the pediments from the temple of Aphaia at Aegina and the Parthenon compositions are fully finished in the round, other temples the back-side of the sculptures are summarily or roughly finished. Some statues from the pediments of the temple of Zeus at Olympia are even hollowed out, to relieve weight.

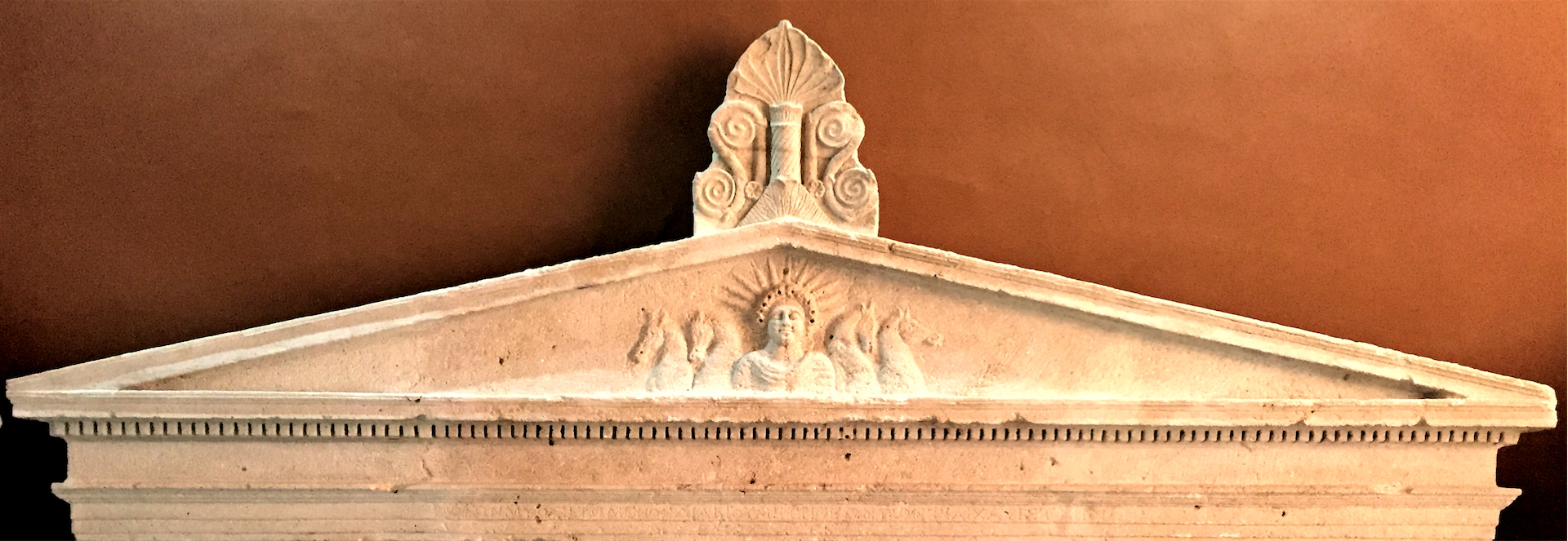
Pediment with acroterion

Aside from sculptural adornment of the tympanum, the triangular or sometimes curved area of a pediment, reclining figures were sometimes placed on the slanting sides above the pediment. Alternatively, the apex, or the apex and both corners, may be topped with vertical elements called acroteria taking the form of urns, palmettes, or figural sculpture.

Walter Copland Perry wrote that it was proof of the power of Greek art that the classical sculptors not only overcame the rigid restrictions of the pediment's shape, but turned them to their advantage. Compositionally, the restrictions imposed by both the physical triangular shape of a pediment, and the traditional themes that are usually employed for the subject matter, are, according to Ernest Arthur Gardner, "as exactly regulated as that of a sonnet or a Spenserian stanza: the artist has liberty only in certain directions and must not violate the laws of rhythm."

In all examples, classical and modern, the central area below the apex is inevitably the tallest, most spacious, the natural focus, and will contain the main figures and the focus of action. Secondary figures decrease in size and importance on both sides, as they approach the far angles at the base. The well-known classical examples all observe "unity of action", although the Greek geographer Pausanias describes a sculpture by Praxiteles in which Hercules appears several times in different sizes.

== See also ==
- Pedimental sculptures in the United States
- Pedimental sculptures in Canada
