= Nicolas Jacquin =

Canadian merchant trader

Nicolas Jacquin (or Nicolas Philibert; 1700 – 21 January 1748) was a merchant trader from New France and the hero of William Kirby's The Golden Dog.

He was born in Martigny-les-Bains which at the time was part of one of the small states that existed around the duchy of Lorraine along the eastern border of France. It is not known when he cane to New France but he was there by 1733.
