= Piccirilli Brothers =

Italian-American family, carved significant marble sculptures in the United States

The Piccirilli Brothers were an Italian-American family of renowned marble carvers and sculptors who carved many of the most significant marble sculptures in the United States, including Daniel Chester French’s colossal Abraham Lincoln (1920) in the Lincoln Memorial, Washington, D.C.

== History ==
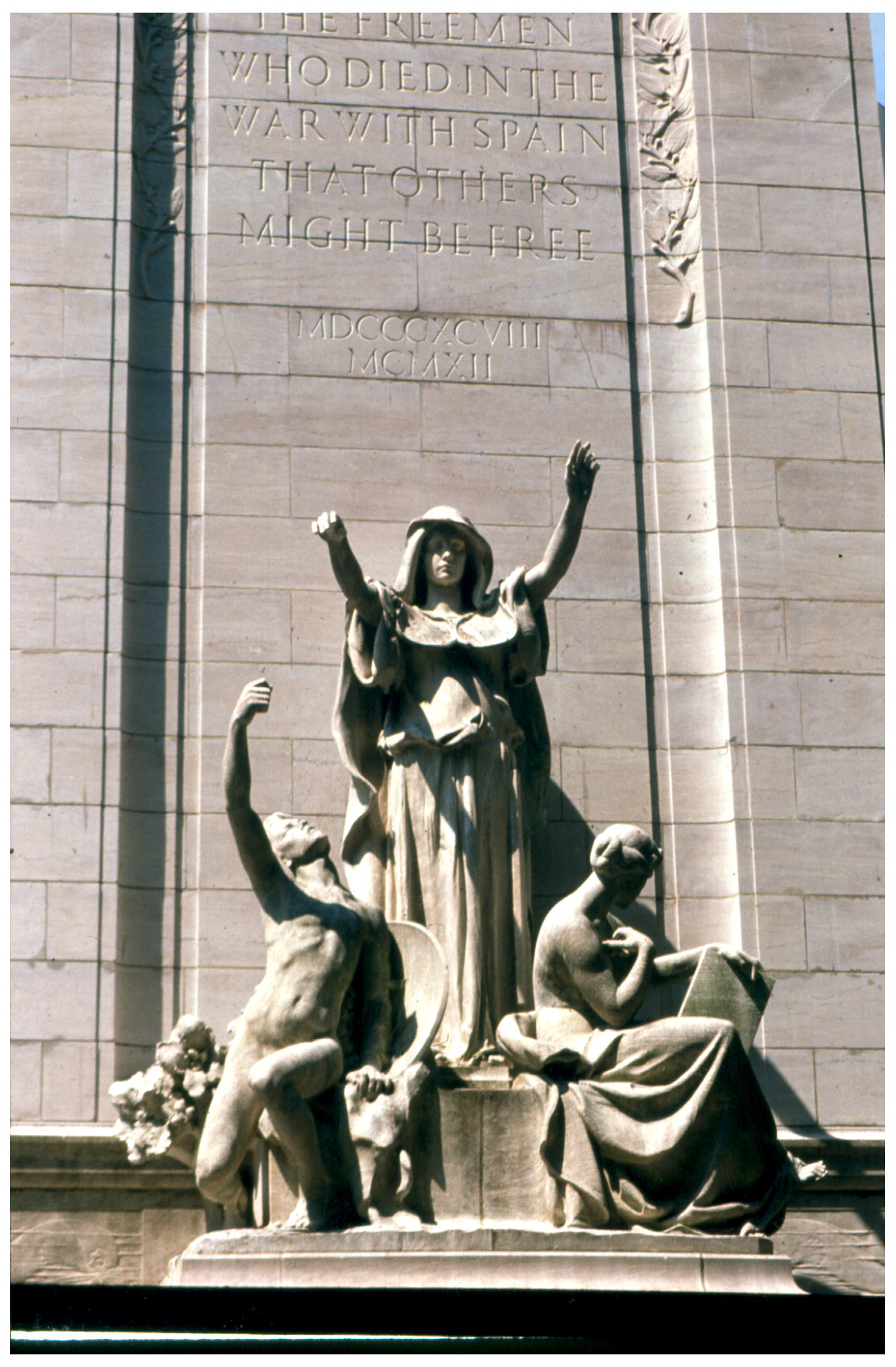
USS Maine National Monument, Central Park, NYC, Atillio Piccirilli, sculptor

In 1888, Giuseppe Piccirilli (1844–1910), a well-known stone carver in Massa and a veteran of Garibaldi's Unification war, brought his family to New York City. Giuseppe, who was born in Rome and received his early training in the atelier of Roman sculptor Stefano Galletti, came from a long line of stone carvers, unbroken since the days of the early Renaissance. All six of Giuseppe's sons—Ferruccio (1864–1945), Attilio (1866–1945), Furio (1868–1949), Masaniello (aka Thomas) (1870–1951), Orazio (aka Horatio, Horace) (1872–1954) and Getulio (1874–1945)—were trained as marble cutters and carvers.

Although the Piccirilli Brothers were known primarily as architectural modelers and the carvers of other sculptors' works, Attilio and Furio further distinguished themselves as sculptors in their own right.

The family lived in a brownstone on 142nd Street in the Mott Haven section of the Bronx and set up a workshop next to their home that eventually occupied an entire city block.

At that time most prominent sculptors created their original work in clay. From that clay model a caster generated a plaster model. The model was then sent to the Piccirilli Brothers who carved it from stone, typically marble, although limestone and granite were also used. The brothers became the carvers of choice for many American sculptors of the time including Daniel Chester French and Paul Wayland Bartlett.

Besides their work as carvers the Piccirilli Brothers also created architectural detailing and embellishments for many public and private buildings.

One of the great losses in American art history occurred when the Piccirilli Brothers studio quietly closed its doors in 1945 and no move was made to secure their records, so the accounts of much of what they had accomplished were lost.

== Original sculpture by the Piccirilli Brothers ==
- USS Maine National Monument, H. Van Buren Magonigle, architect, Atillio Piccirilli, sculptor 1913; Columbus Circle, New York City.
- Firemen's Memorial, H. Van Buren Magonigle, architect, Atillio Piccirilli, sculptor figures of Courage and Duty 1913: Riverside Park at 100th Street, New York City
- Much of the stonework on the California Building in San Diego’s Balboa Park and the attached buildings at the 1915 Panama–California Exposition.
- Manitoba Legislative Building, 1919, Simon and Boddington, architects, figures of Sieur de La Vérendrye and Lord Selkirk, plus many architectural figures and details, Winnipeg, Manitoba
- Stonework outside Riverside Church, Allen & Collens and Henry C. Pelton architects, Atillio Piccirilli, sculptor 1930; Riverside Drive, New York City
- Fiorello H. LaGuardia Grave Memorial. Woodlawn Cemetery, New York Lombardo, Joseph Vincent. Piccirilli: Life of an American Sculptor. Pitman Publishing Corporation, Chicago.

== Selected works carved for other sculptors ==
- Washington Square Arch (1895), Stanford White, architect, New York City.
  - Spandrel figures (1895), Frederick MacMonnies, sculptor.
  - George Washington as Commander-in-Chief, Accompanied by Fame and Valor (1916), Hermon Atkins MacNeil, sculptor.
  - George Washington as President, Accompanied by Wisdom and Justice (1918), Alexander Stirling Calder.
- New York Stock Exchange Building (1903), George B. Post, architect, New York City.
  - Pedimental sculpture: Integrity Protecting the Works of Man (1904), John Quincy Adams Ward and Paul Wayland Bartlett, sculptors
- U.S. Custom House, Cass Gilbert, architect, New York City.
  - The Four Continents (1907), Daniel Chester French, sculptor
  - 12 cornice statues (1907), Charles Grafly, Frederick Ruckstull, Augustus Lukeman, and other sculptors
- Civic Virtue Fountain (1909), Frederick MacMonnies, sculptor, Thomas Hastings, architect. Originally created for New York's City Hall Park, moved in 1941 to Queens Borough Hall, moved to Green-Wood Cemetery in 2012.
- Statue of Samuel Spencer, collaboration with Daniel Chester French and Henry Bacon (1910)
- Pennsylvania State Capitol sculpture groups (1911), George Grey Barnard, sculptor, Joseph Miller Huston, architect, Harrisburg, Pennsylvania.
- Brooklyn Museum, McKim, Mead, and White, architects, Brooklyn, New York City.
  - Pedimental sculpture: Science and Art (1913), Daniel Chester French and Adolph Alexander Weinman, sculptors
  - 30 cornice figures (1913), Augustus Lukeman, Karl Bitter, Charles Keck, Janet Scudder, Herbert Adams, Carl Heber and others, sculptors,
- Pedimental sculpture: Apotheosis of Democracy (1916), House of Representatives Wing, United States Capitol, Paul Bartlett, sculptor, Thomas U. Walter, architect, Washington, D.C.
- New York Public Library Main Branch, (1911) Carrère and Hastings, architects, New York City.
  - Pedimental sculptures: The Arts (1917) and History (1917), George Grey Barnard, sculptor
  - 6 cornice figures (1917), each 11-foot-tall (3.4 m), Paul Wayland Bartlett, sculptor
  - Patience and Fortitude (1911), 2 lions flanking the entrance, Edward Clark Potter, sculptor.
- Death and the Sculptor (1917), Daniel Chester French, sculptor, Metropolitan Museum of Art. Carved from French's 1893 plaster model.
- Abraham Lincoln (1920), Daniel Chester French, sculptor, Lincoln Memorial, Washington, D.C.
- DuPont Circle Fountain (1921), Daniel Chester French, sculptor, Henry Bacon, architect, Washington, D.C.
- Tomb of the Unknowns (Tomb of the Unknown Soldier) (1931), Thomas Hudson Jones, sculptor, Lorimer Rich, architect, Arlington National Cemetery, Arlington, Virginia
- Waldo Hutchins bench (1932), Eric Gugler, architect, Central Park, Manhattan, New York City
Washington Square Arch (1895-1918), New York City: architectural ornament and Washington statues

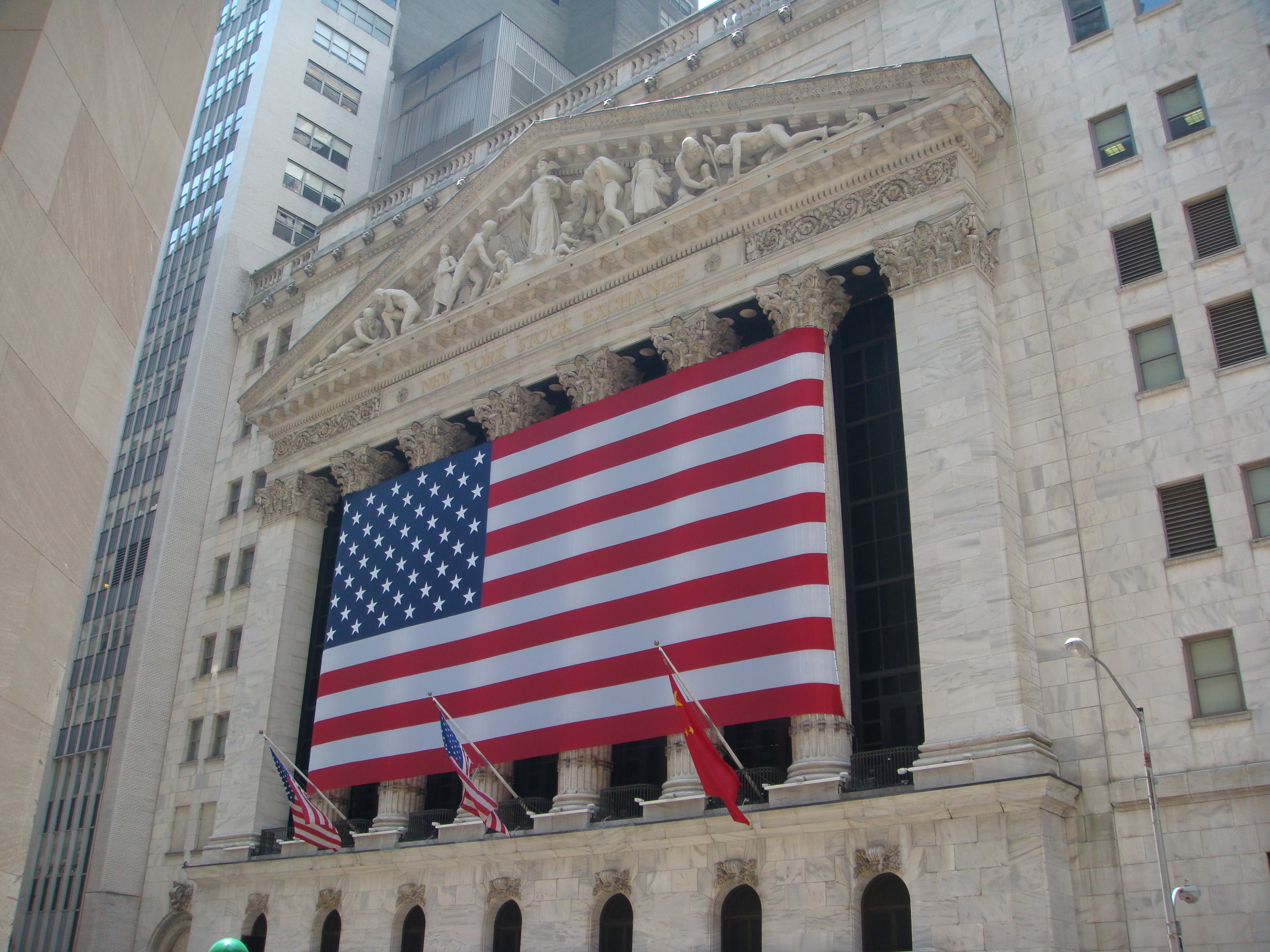
New York Stock Exchange Building (1903), New York City: pedimental sculpture

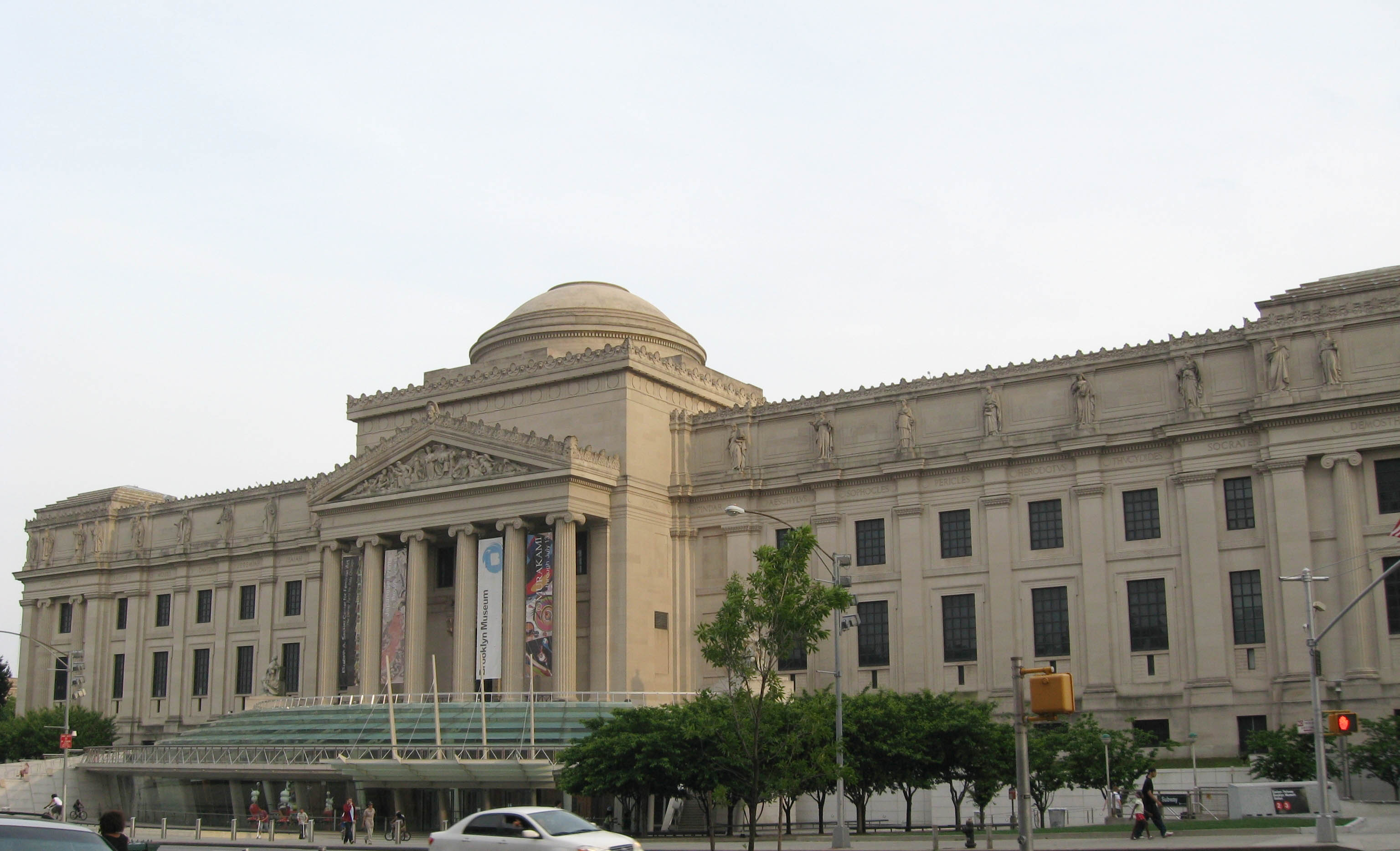
Brooklyn Museum (1913), Brooklyn, New York City: pedimental sculpture and cornice figures

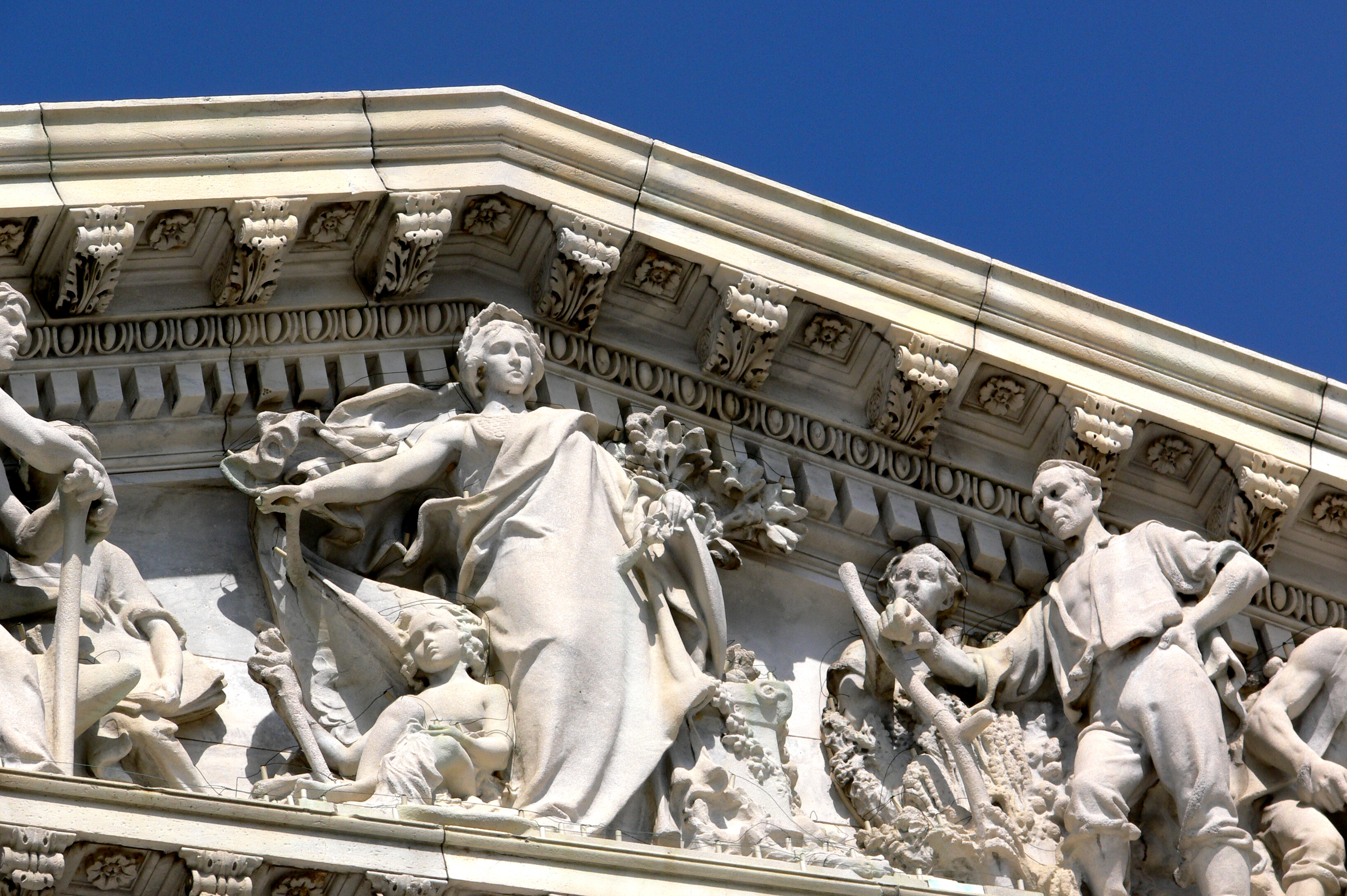
United States Capitol (1916), Washington, D.C.: House of Representatives pedimental sculpture

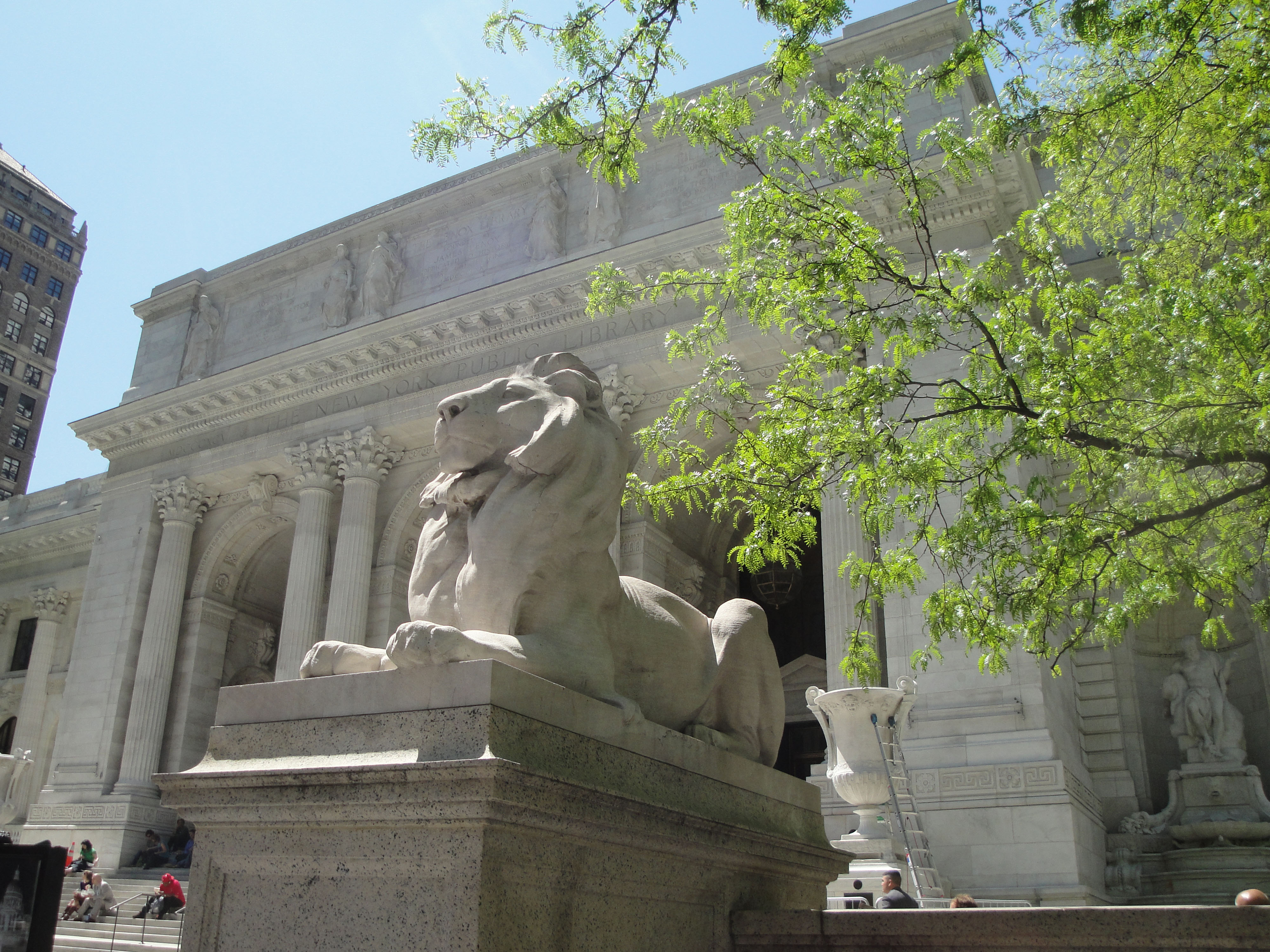
New York Public Library Main Branch (1916), New York City: Lions, cornice figures, pedimental sculpture

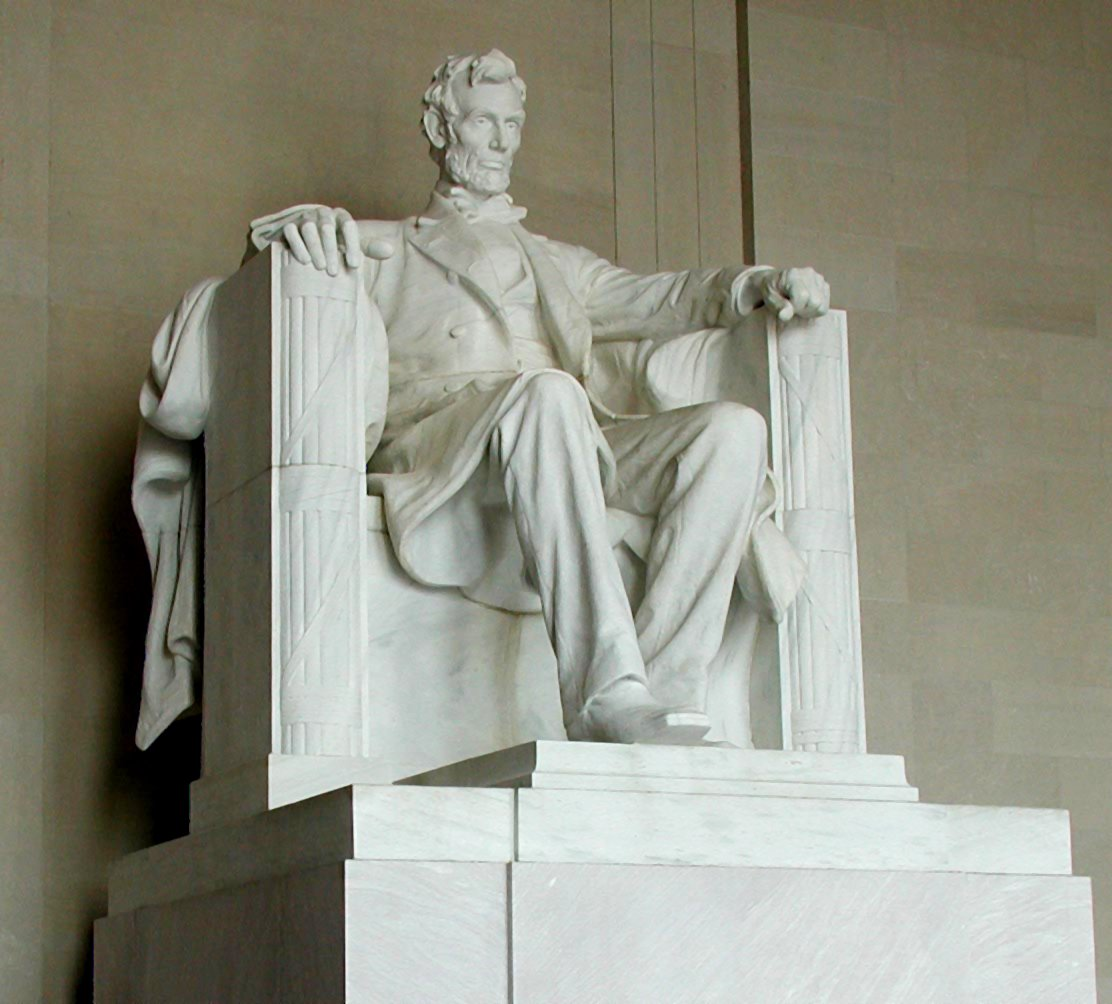
Abraham Lincoln (1920), Lincoln Memorial, Washington, D.C.

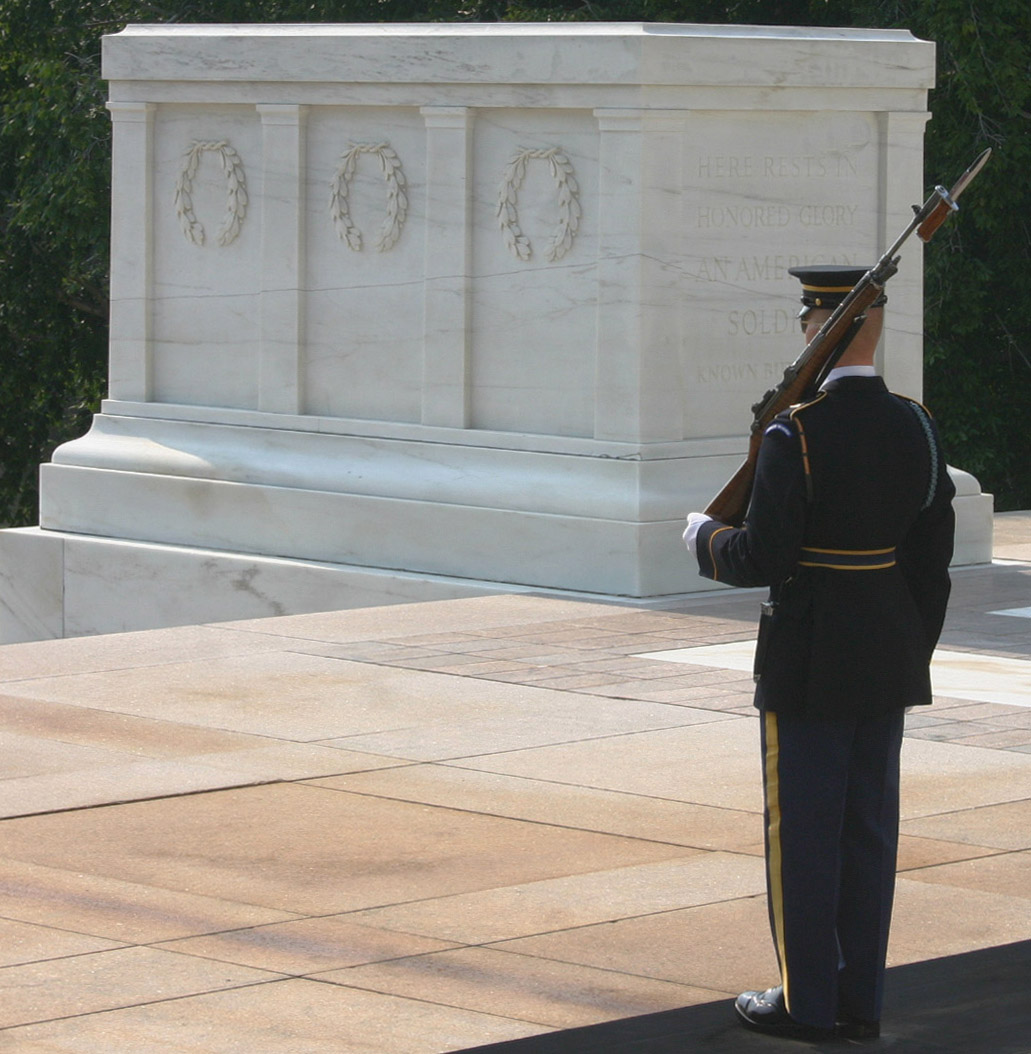
Tomb of the Unknowns (1931), Arlington National Cemetery

== See also ==
- Yule Marble
