= Statue of Christopher Columbus (Astoria, Queens) =

Statue in Astoria, New York City, by Angelo Racioppi

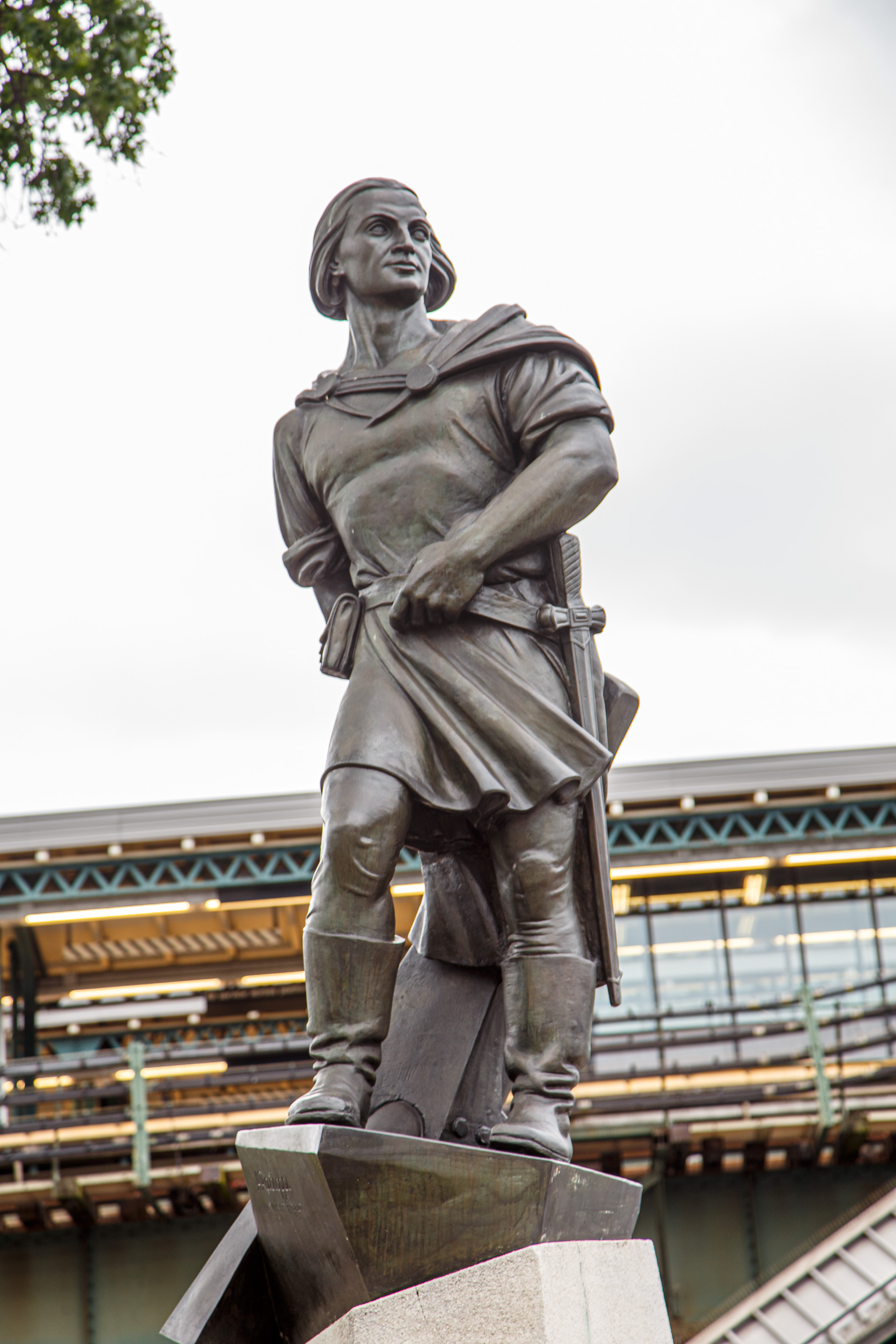

- Artist: Angelo Racioppi
- Year: 1941
- Medium: Bronze
- Subject: Christopher Columbus
- Location: Columbus Square park, Astoria, Queens
- 40°46′12.3″N 73°55′3.4″W

Columbus is a statue in Astoria, Queens created by Angelo Racioppi with funds from the New York City Works Progress Administration Art Project. It stands in Columbus Square park, near the Astoria Boulevard station of the New York City Subway. Dedicated in 1941, it is in bronze on a cast stone base. It depicts Christopher Columbus as a young, energetic explorer at the helm. The base the statue sits on suggests the prow of a ship.

== History ==
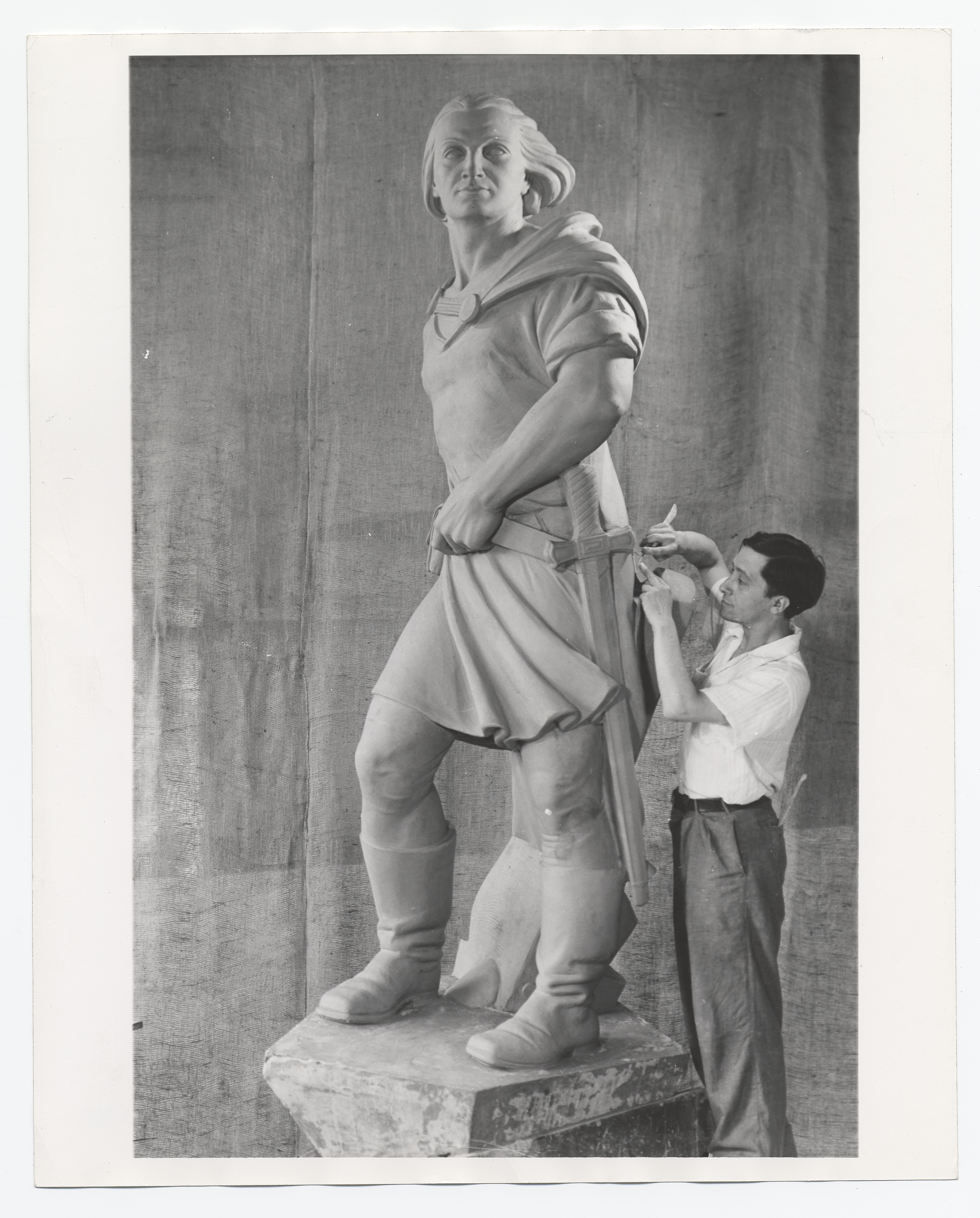
Racioppi working on the statue

The origins of the statue lie in the 1920s in the Italian-American community in Long Island and Astoria. It began raising money for the statue, but work stalled when the community couldn't afford a base. By 1930, the Board of Aldermen had renamed the park, on the east side of the Astoria Boulevard (BMT Astoria Line) station, Columbus Square. The statue was dedicated in 1941, but that year it provoked an argument between Queens Borough President George U. Harvey and Parks Commissioner Robert Moses. During World War II, the statue was removed and hidden on fears of being taken for war-use scrap metal. After some years in warehouses and the basement of Queens Borough Hall, it was reinstalled on its base.

== See also ==
- List of monuments and memorials to Christopher Columbus
