= Attilio Piccirilli =

American sculptor (1866–1945)

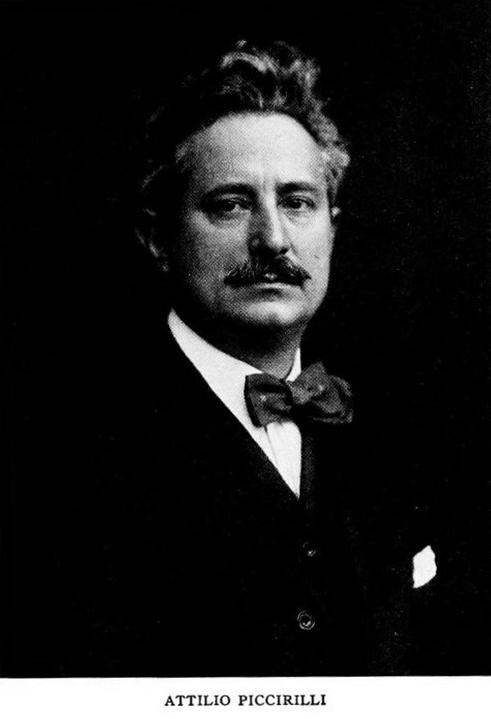
- Piccirilli, circa 1916
- Born: May 16, 1866; Massa, Italy
- Died: October 8, 1945 (aged 79); New York City, U.S.
- Resting place: Woodlawn Cemetery
- Education: Accademia di San Luca
- Known for: sculpture
- Relatives: Piccirilli Brothers

Attilio Piccirilli (May 16, 1866 – October 8, 1945) was an American sculptor. Born in Massa, Italy, he was educated at the Accademia di San Luca of Rome.

== Life and career ==
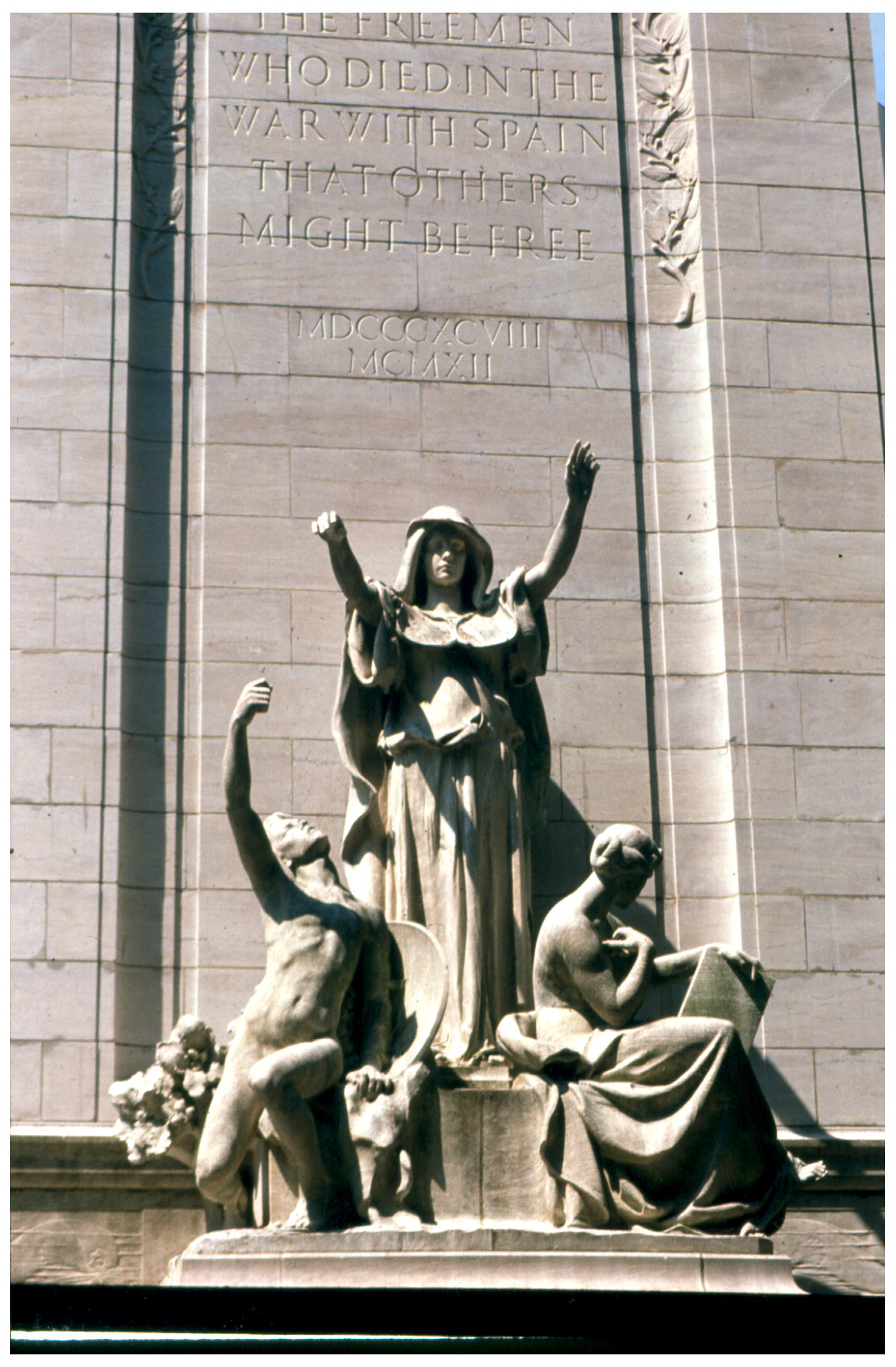
Maine Memorial, NYC, 1913

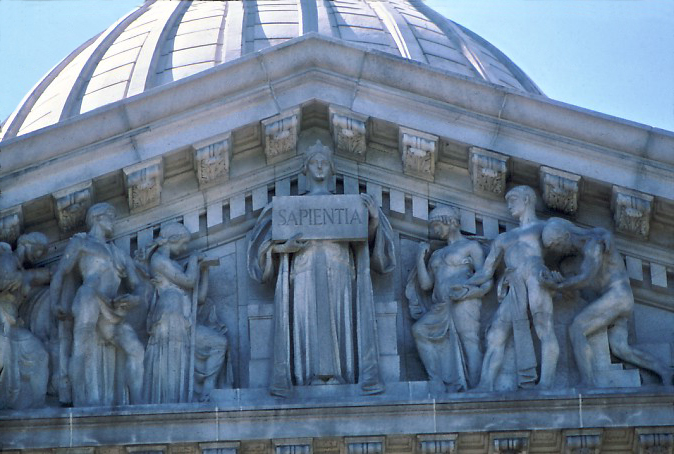
Wisconsin State Capitol

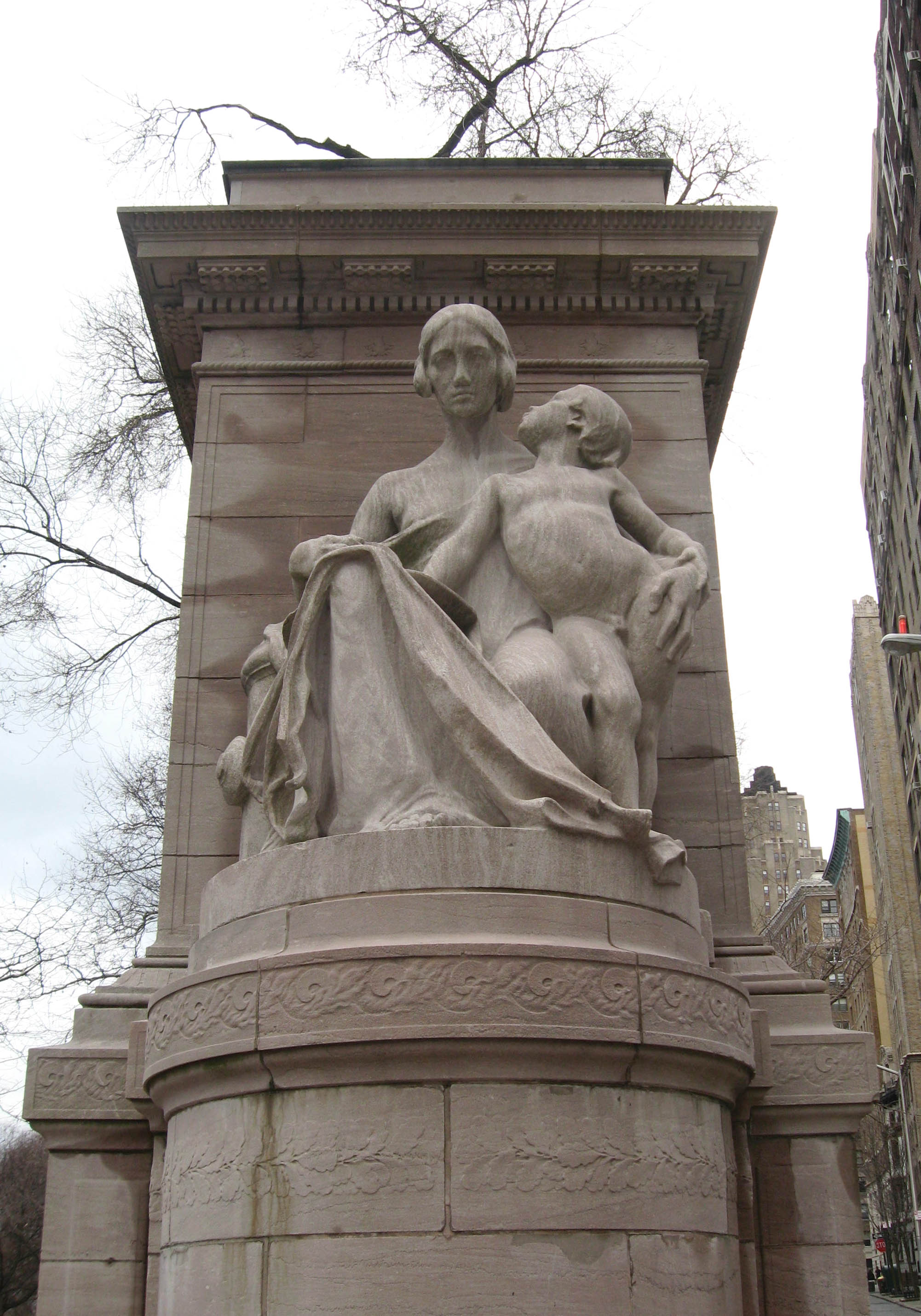
Allegorical figures at the Firemen's Memorial, 1913

Piccirilli came to the United States in 1888 and worked for his father and then with the Piccirilli Brothers as a sculptor, modeler, and stone carver at their studio in Mott Haven, Bronx, New York City, at 467 East 142nd Street. This location is now a vacant lot. As an artist in his own right, he is the author of the US Maine Memorial Group in Columbus Circle, at the entrance to Central Park in Manhattan. The group consists of the gilded Columbia Triumphant on top of the monument, Fortitude, Pacific, Atlantic, Justice, and History. One of the sculptures created for this monument was also used for his mother's memorial at Woodlawn Cemetery. Also, in New York, he created two pediments and other sculptural details for the Frick Mansion the Firemen's Memorial, a group of figures in Riverside Park which consists of two marble figures on the side known as Duty and Courage, and a bronze table of monumental proportions with the design of a fire engine pulled by galloping horses.

As Piccirilli gained fame, he became invaluable to many American sculptors. Before Piccirilli and his family arrived in America, many American artists were forced to travel to Italy to have their models carved into stone. In the case of Attilio, if an artist presented him with a small plaster model, Attilio could create a marble replica to any size. In fact, the vast majority of Attilio's works were designed by other artists. Fragilina is one of the view works that was designed and sculpted into marble by Attilio himself. Piccirilli's most famous work is the creation of the Lincoln statue for the Lincoln Memorial in Washington, which was originally designed by Daniel Chester French. Attilio and his family collaborated with Paul Bartlett, Frederick MacMonnies, Hermon MacNeil, Massey Rhind, Karl Bitter, Augustus Saint-Gaudens, Olin Warner, Lorado Taft, Charles Niehaus, and Andrew O'Connor. Piccirrili also did architectural work for Cass Gilbert, Henry Bacon, McKim, Mead, and White, Carrére, and Hastings. Attilio's most famous works that which he designed and sculpted are the Maine Monument in Central Park, New York and the Fireman's Monument on Riverside Drive, New York. He also designed a Monument to Guglielmo Marconi (1941) in Washington DC.

Piccirilli became a member of the National Academy of Design and the Architectural League. He won numerous prizes including a Gold Medal at the Panama Pacific Exposition in San Francisco in 1915. Attilio also helped create the Leonardo da Vinci Art School in New York City, New York. Its purpose was to give affordable training in art, like sculpture, to New York's poor.

Piccirilli's 1935 Pyrex glass relief sculpture Advance Forever, Eternal Youth over the entrance of the Palazzo d'Italia at Rockefeller Center was removed during World War Two when the Italian inscriptions were used by Mussolini, and it was associated with fascist iconography. It disappeared from storage some years afterwards.

Piccirilli is represented in the sculpture collection at Brookgreen Gardens. His work is also found in museums around the United States. White marble "Fragilina" now stands in the newly re-arranged American Wing of the Metropolitan Museum of Art in New York.

He died in New York City in 1945. He is interred at Woodlawn Cemetery in The Bronx, New York City. His half-length portrait by Edmond Thomas Quinn is in the collection of the National Academy of Design.

== Selected public commissions ==
- MacDonough Memorial, New Orleans, Louisiana, 1898
- Indian Literature and Indian Law Giver, facade of the Brooklyn Museum, Brooklyn, New York, 1909
- Maine Memorial, Columbus Circle, New York, 1913
- Firemen's Memorial, Riverside Drive, New York City. 1913
- North pediment, Wisconsin State Capitol, Madison, Wisconsin. 1915
- Mothers' War Memorial, Mater Christi Memorial Grove, South Lake and New Scotland Avenues, Albany, New York, 1923
- James Monroe Statue, Ash Lawn, Albemarle County, Virginia
- Thomas Jefferson Bust, Rotunda of Virginia State Capitol, Capitol Square, Richmond, Virginia, 1931.
- James Monroe Bust, Rotunda of Virginia State Capitol, Capitol Square, Richmond, Virginia, 1931
- Joy of Life (Young Faun), Governor's Mansion, Richmond, Virginia, 1931
- Advance Forever Eternal Youth (Sempre Avanti Eterna Giovinezza), The first of two glass sculptures, above Palazzo d'Italia entrance for Rockefeller Center, New York City, 1935, removed in 1940, destroyed 1968
- Youth Leading Industry, The second of two glass (Pyrex) sculptures (the first being 'Eternal Youth'), over the main entrance of the International Building 636 Fifth Avenue, Rockefeller Center, New York City, 1935
- Contemporary Postman, lobby, William Jefferson Clinton Federal Building, Washington D.C., 1936
- Joy of Life, frieze above doorway, One Rockefeller Plaza (48th Street Entrance), New York City, 1937
- Guglielmo Marconi Memorial, Washington D.C. 1941

== Fragilina ==
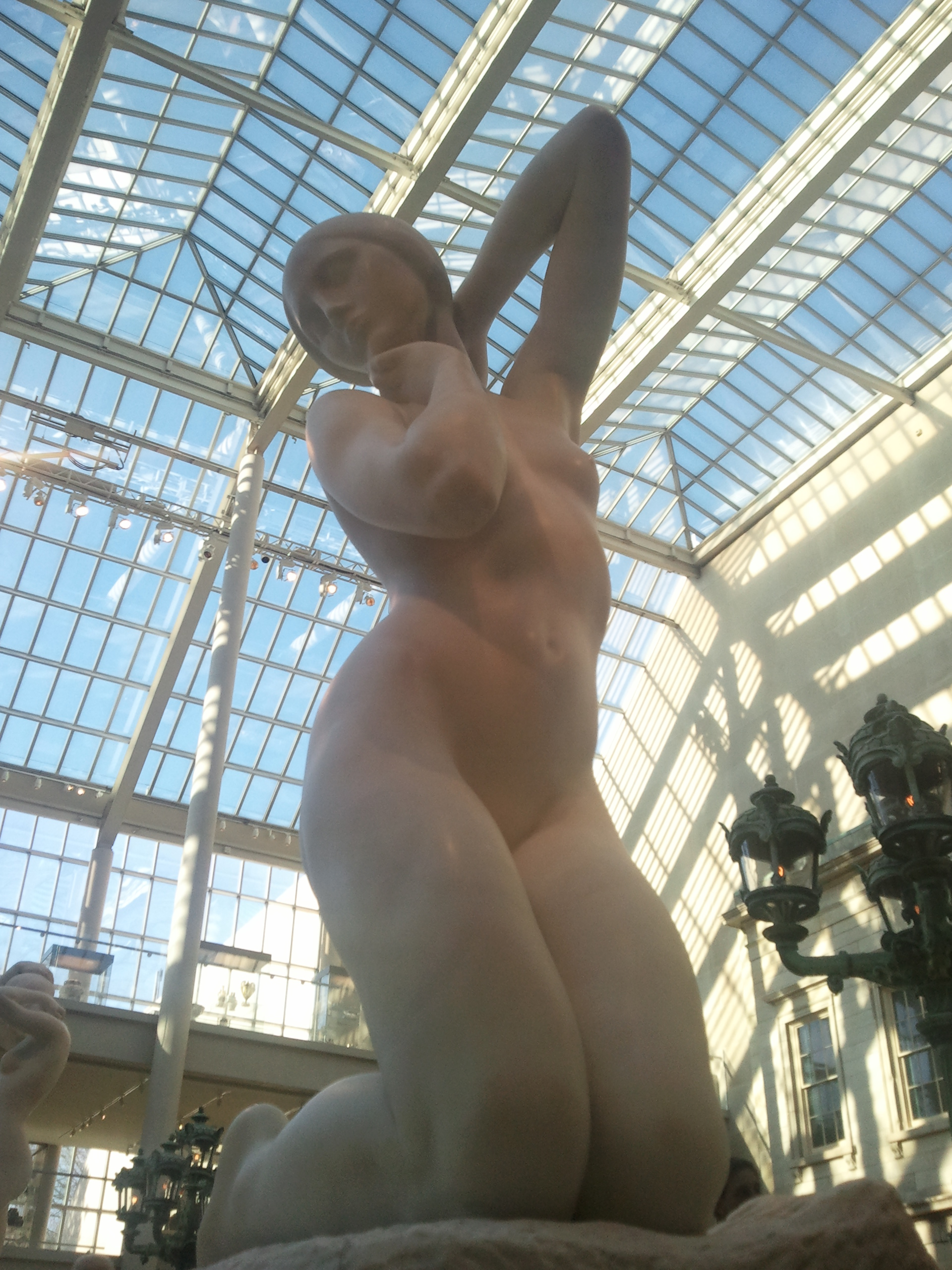
Fragilina in Metropolitan Museum of Art

Fragilina is the name given to a sculpture completed by Attilio Piccirilli in 1923. The original is now in the Metropolitan Museum of Art in New York City, New York. It is 48 ½ inches by 15 ½ inches by 25 inches. It is completely made of marble. Piccirilli also made five additional smaller copies, one of which is in the Muscarelle Museum of Art at the College of William and Mary.

"Fragilina" in Italian means "the little delicate one." Fragilina is part of a series of female nudes that Attilio sculpted, beginning with "A Soul" in 1909. The woman in Fragilina is almost identical in pose to the woman in "A Soul." Though, in Fragilina, more marble is cut away to leave a freer, fluid, and abstract work. Going with the theme of the work being abstract, many art critics criticize the oval-shaped head that gives less definition to the hair and face. Some say, "the eyes appear almost veiled in stone." When discussing Fragilina, Piccirilli said, "Every person has his own ideal of beauty stored away in his subconscious mind. When facial characteristics are precisely delineated, the observer is denied the opportunity of personally visualizing his ideal type. This reaction frequently takes place without full realization." So, as can be seen with Fragilina and his subsequent works, it can be said he was a minimalist. Piccirilli was described impeccably in the book, Attilio Piccirilli: Life of an American Sculptor, by Josef Vincent Lombardo. Lombardo writes, "Piccirilli's art stands out boldly for its discipline, simplicity, and dignity.... His sculpture was and is simply tailored, free from adventitious detail and superficiality... Piccirilli's style is distinctly personal and highly selective. Simplicity is his gospel, restraint his creed." Fragilina was one of five works Piccirilli showed at the exhibit at the National Sculpture Society in New York in 1923. It was also exhibited at the National Academy of Design commemorative exhibition in 1925. Piccirilli also made smaller versions of Fragilina, including two bronze casts. One of which is at the Museum of Fine Arts in Boston.
