= Firemen's Memorial (Manhattan) =

Historic monument in New York City

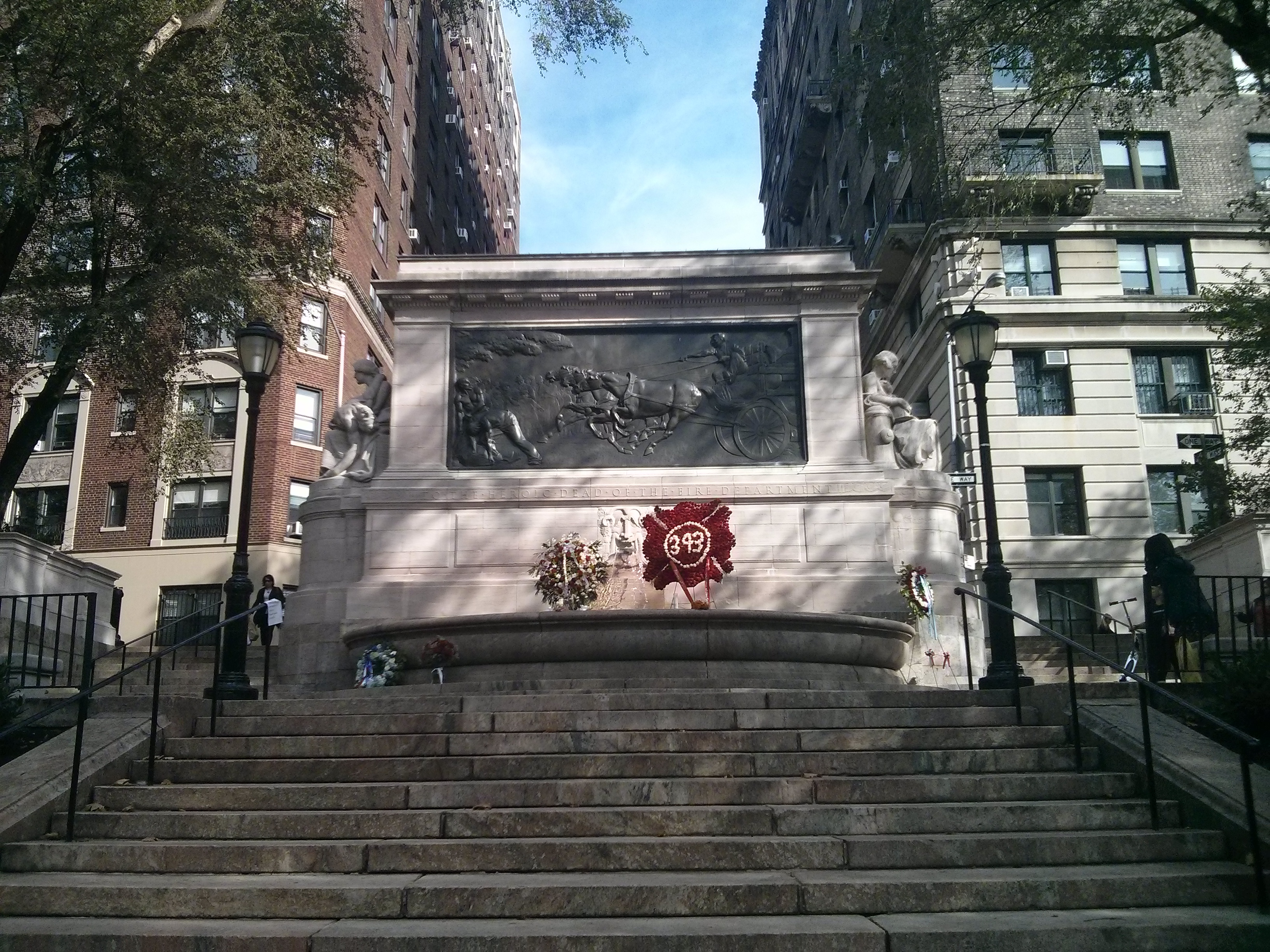
- The Firemen's Memorial in September 2014
- Year: 1913
- Type: Fountain, sculpture, bas relief
- Medium: Knoxville marble
- Dimensions: 3.8 m × 11 m × 3.0 m (12.5 ft × 37 ft × 10 ft)
- Location: New York City, New York, United States; 40.798637°N 73.973335°W
- Website: http://www.nycgovparks.org/parks/riverside-park/monuments/482

The Firemen's Memorial is a 1913 monument on Riverside Drive at 100th Street in Manhattan, New York.

== Context ==
Like other large cities, New York was devastated by fires in the 18th and 19th centuries. In 1776, in the midst of the American Revolutionary War, a great fire swept through the city, destroying 493 buildings. Two more great fires, in 1835 and 1845, together destroyed approximately 1000 buildings and killed 50 people, including a number of firefighters. Fire safety improved in the late 19th and early 20th century, but firefighting remained a dangerous task. Following the 1908 drowning death of Deputy Fire Chief Charles W. Kruger in a flooded Canal Street basement, Bishop Henry C. Potter proposed a memorial to firefighters who had died while performing their duties.

Potter established a committee to build a monument, and was its first chairman, being succeeded by Isidor Straus, co-owner of Macy's. The Board of Estimate and Apportionment granted $40,000 to the project on July 17, 1911, and an additional $50,500 was raised through a popular subscription.

Although originally planned for Union Square, the memorial eventually ended up being built on the fashionable Riverside Drive, alongside which ran Frederick Law Olmsted's English-style rustic Riverside Park. The monument was designed by architect Harold Van Buren Magonigle and its sculptures are by Attilio Piccirilli. The site consists of a grand staircase leading up from the west, a balustraded plaza, and the Knoxville marble monument. Above the fountain, which extends from the box-like structure of the monument, is a large bas-relief scene of a horse drawn engine rushing to a fire. The monument is flanked to the north and south with groups of sculptures representing "Duty" and "Sacrifice".

== Inscription ==
The inscription on the reverse of the monument reads:

To the men of the fire department
of the city of New York
who died at the call of duty
soldiers in a war that never ends
this memorial is dedicated
by the people of a grateful city
Erected MCMXII

== Architects ==
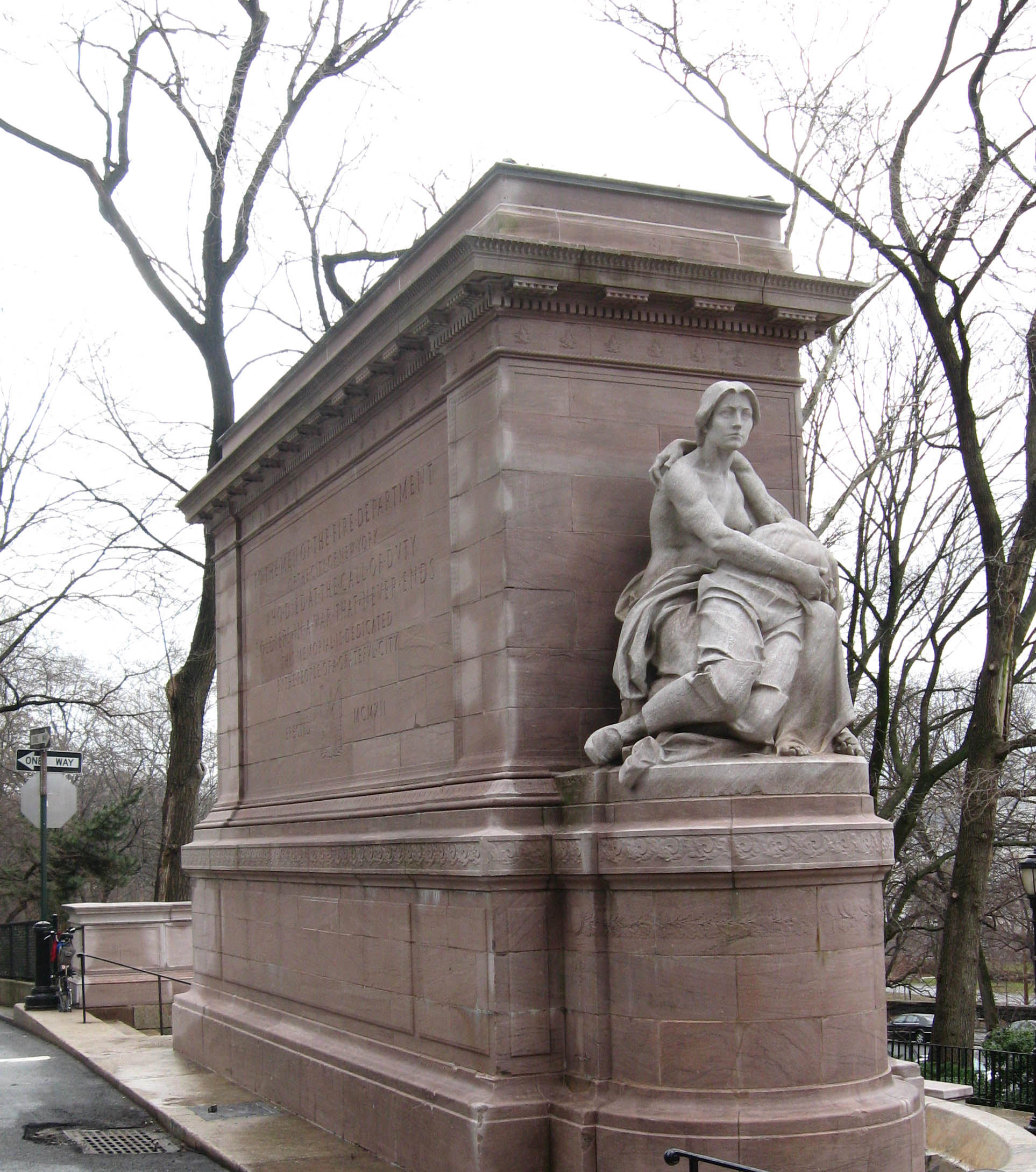
Northern figures

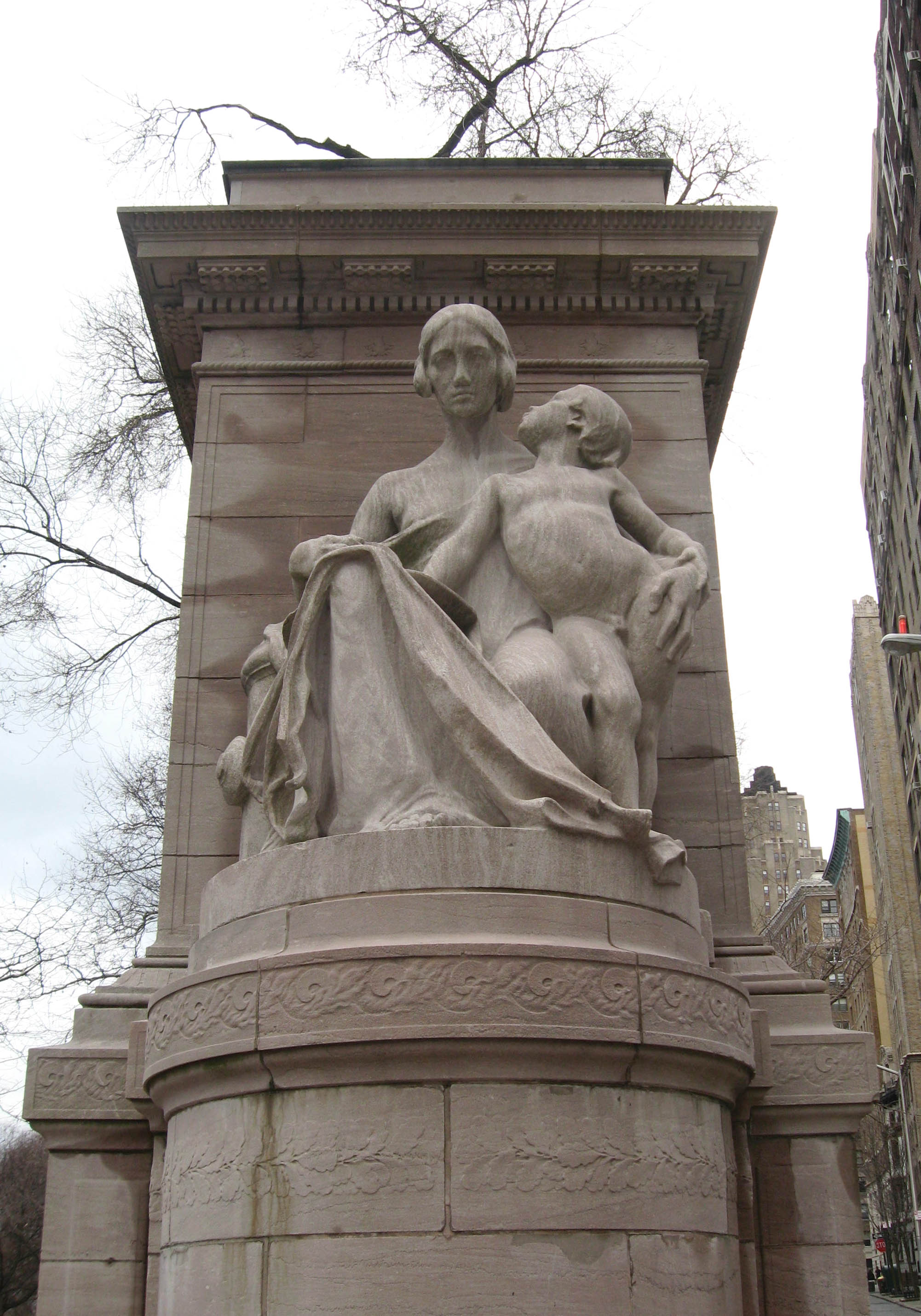
Southern figures

A New Jersey native, Magonigle was a successful architect of monuments, including the McKinley Memorial Mausoleum in Ohio and the Liberty Memorial in Missouri. Piccirilli studied marble carving at his father's studio in Italy, before moving to the United States in 1888. Magonigle and Piccirilli had collaborated previously on the USS Maine National Monument in Central Park, and Piccirilli used the same model (Audrey Munson) for the female figures of both. Piccirilli's independent fragment, Study of a Head, is derived from the Firemen's Memorial and is housed in the collection of the Metropolitan Museum of Art.

Dianne Durante compared Piccirilli's northern cluster of statues (a woman cradling the limp body of a firefighter) to Michelangelo's statue of a grieving Madonna. She also praised the southern cluster, the same woman holding a child (presumably the widow and child of the dead firefighter), a scene she describes as "wrenching." She attributes the power of the bas-relief to communicate the urgency and drama to the artist's decision to depict a horse-drawn engine, rather than an emotionless motorized engine, and she attributes the timelessness of the sculptures to the use of classical, simple drapery, rather than contemporary costume.

== Dedication and tablet ==
The monument was dedicated on September 5, 1913. Every autumn, a ceremony is held at the memorial to honor the memory of firefighters who have died protecting the city. Attended by the mayor, the fire commissioner and thousands of firefighters, the ceremony gained even greater significance after the September 11 attacks of 2001. 343 New York firefighters died responding to the attacks and collapse of the World Trade Center. In the weeks that followed, the memorial became a shrine for those firefighters, an annual ceremony at the memorial is now also held on September 11 each year.

In 1927 a bronze tablet was installed in the plaza beneath the memorial. The tablet, placed by the American Society for the Prevention of Cruelty to Animals, is dedicated to the horses which, in earlier years, pulled the fire department's engines.

== See also ==
- List of firefighting monuments and memorials
