= Civic Virtue =

Sculpture in New York City

- Civic Virtue Triumphant Over Unrighteousness
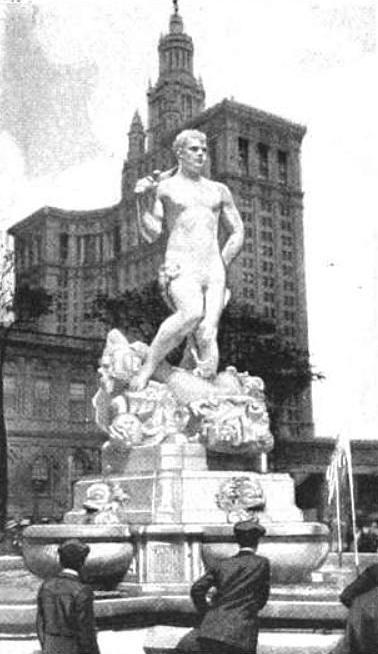
- The statue in front of New York City Hall, lower left, with the Manhattan Municipal Building behind it, 1922
- Artist: Frederick William MacMonnies
- Year: 1909–1922
- Medium: Marble
- Subject: Male nude
- Dimensions: 5.2 m (17 ft)
- Location: New York City; 40.714198°N 73.829788°W
- Owner: Green-Wood Cemetery

Civic Virtue Triumphant Over Unrighteousness (1909–1922) is a sculpture group and fountain in New York City, created by sculptor Frederick William MacMonnies and architect Thomas Hastings, and carved by the Piccirilli Brothers. The fountain was originally placed in front of New York City Hall in Manhattan, spent almost 72 years beside Queens Borough Hall in Queens, and the sculpture group is now located in Green-Wood Cemetery in Brooklyn.

== Description ==
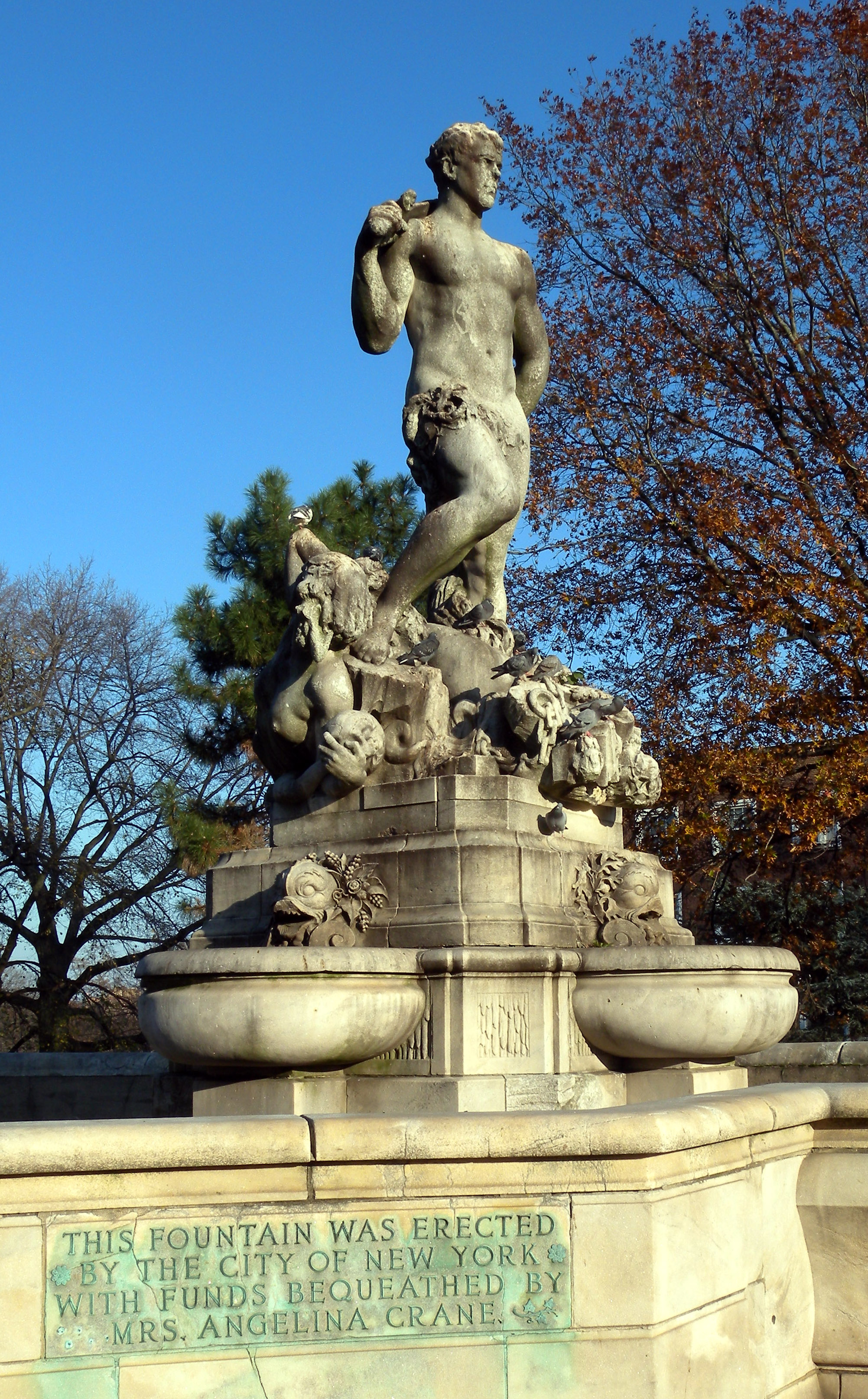
Dedication plaque

The marble fountain was commissioned in 1909 by Mayor George B. McClellan, Jr., with funds from a bequest by Angelina Crane, and cost US$90,000 to complete. The 17-foot sculpture group depicts a heroic-sized male nude, "Civic Virtue" (often mistaken for "Hercules"), with sword on shoulder, standing above two writhing female figures – the sirens of "Vice" and "Corruption." The sirens, with the heads and torsos of women and the tails of serpents, have failed in capturing the man, and are caught in their own nets. Although there is a legend that bodybuilder Charles Atlas posed for the male figure, a 1922 article identifies the model as Edward Raffo, an Italian-American bicyclist. The sculpture group was placed upon a square pedestal adorned with dolphin heads that spewed water into basins attached to its sides. The water spilled from the basins into a pool shaped like an irregular cross, set upon a 3-stepped plinth.

Even before its completion, the sculpture was controversial because of its treatment of the female figures: "[MacMonnies's] conflation of the public (municipal) and personal (psychological) disturbed many people." American women had just gotten the right to vote in 1920, and the sculpture group was seen as misogynistic.

== Manhattan ==
The Angelina Crane Fountain was installed in front of New York City Hall, and unveiled on April 20, 1922.

MacMonnies later answered the critics of his sculpture:

"What do I care if all the ignoramuses and quack politicians in New York, together with all the damn-fool women get together to talk about my statue? Let'em cackle. Let 'em babble. You can't change the eternal verities that way."

"Can it be, that the women are angry because some man finally found the strength to resist temptation? In most instances of romantic sculpture, we have the man succumbing to the temptress. I think women should be pleased when strength is found to withstand their wonderful wiles. Antiquity is all the other way."

"From Paris to Patagonia — universal allegory pictures sirens, temptresses, as woman. If you suppress allegory you suppress all intellectual effort. I gather that allegory has long been extinct in City Hall."

== Exile ==
Mayor Fiorello H. La Guardia, who was mayor from 1934 to 1945, hated the sculpture. He called it "Fat Boy", and resented being confronted with the male figure's naked buttocks each day as he left City Hall. When Queens erected a new Borough Hall in 1940, LaGuardia seized the opportunity and gave the fountain to Queens where it was removed to in February 1941.

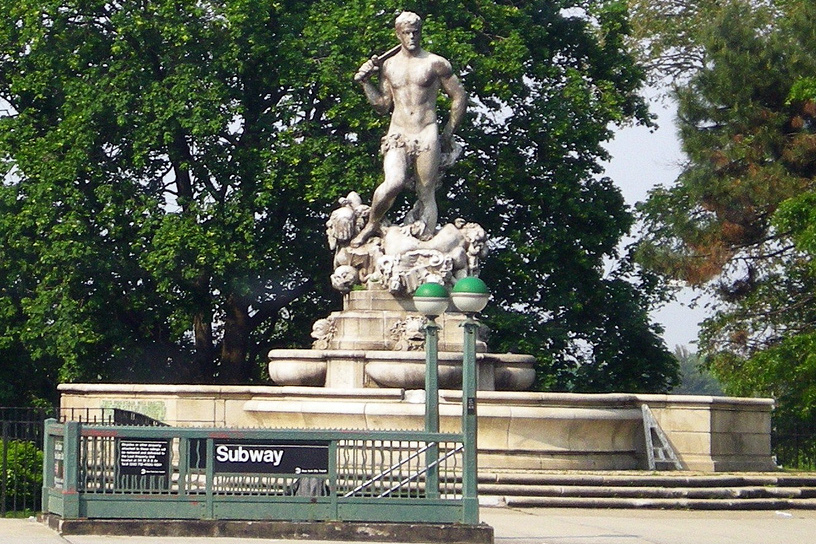
The statue beside Queens Borough Hall

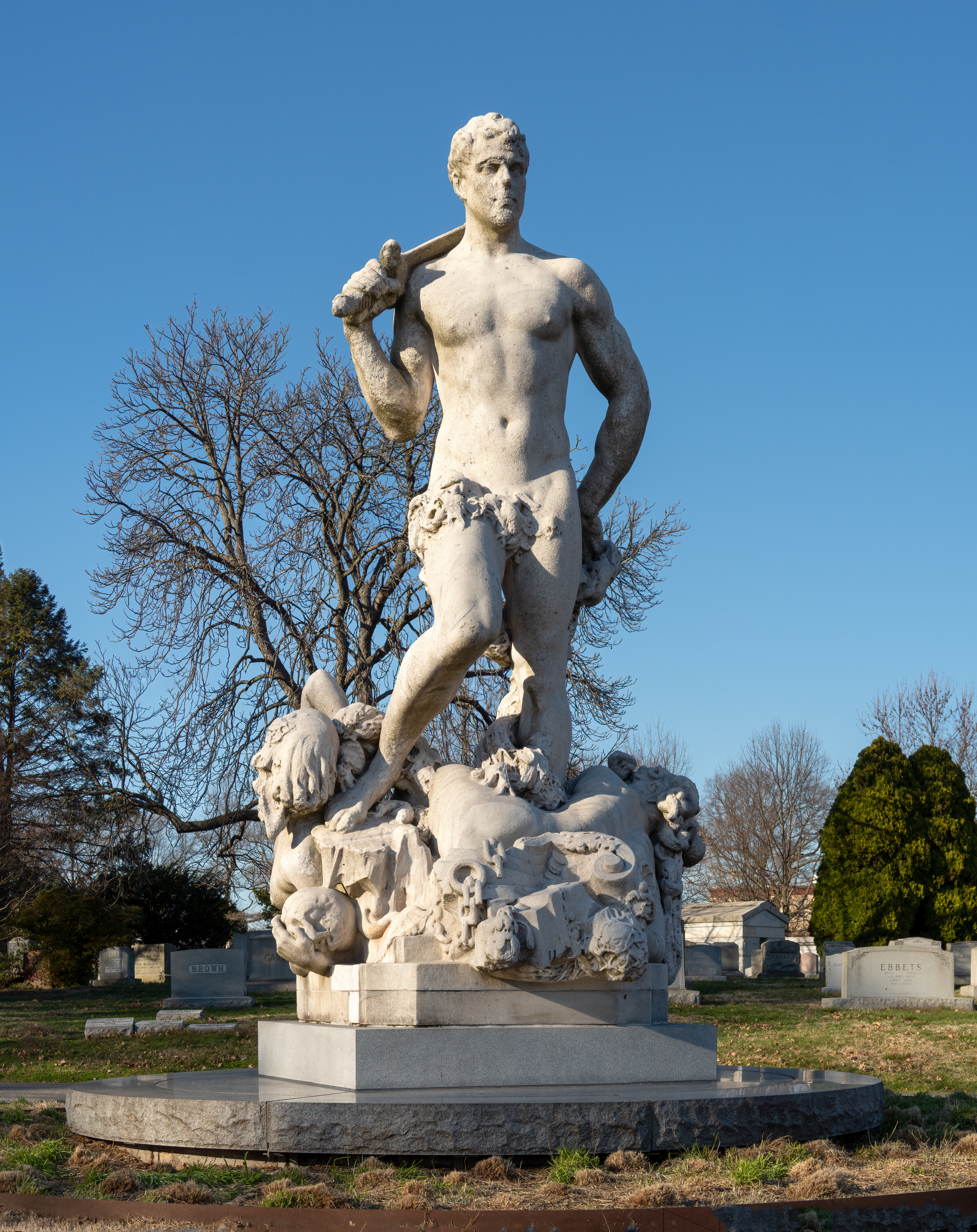
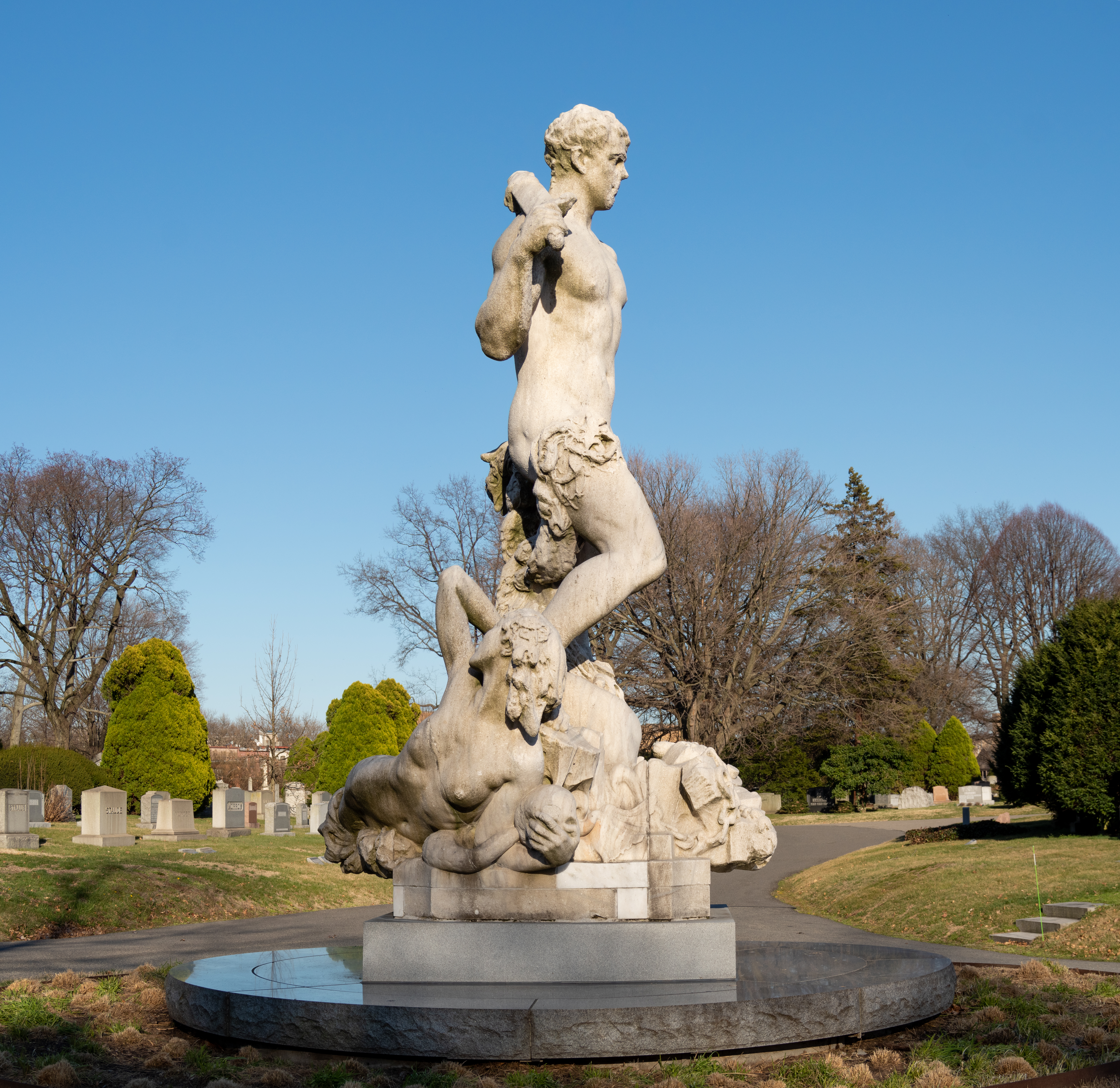
Civic Virtue front and side in Green-Wood Cemetery

The fountain was installed in Kew Gardens, at Queens Boulevard and Union Turnpike, beside the new Borough Hall. It was unveiled on May 29, 1941.

The fountain was the site of a 1972 feminist movement demonstration. In 1987, Queens's first woman president, Claire Shulman, proposed that the statue be moved: "A municipal building is not an appropriate place for a statue that portrays women as evil and treacherous."

The marble sculpture and fountain deteriorated markedly, but Queens did not have the money to restore it.

Former Congressman Anthony Weiner, in the first public event of his unsuccessful campaign for mayor of New York City, held a press conference at the fountain on February 25, 2011. He decried its depiction of women and demanded its removal, even its sale on Craigslist. Green-Wood Cemetery agreed to accept it. The sculpture group, without the pedestal and pool of the Angelina Crane Fountain, was removed from Queens Borough Hall on December 15, 2012, and relocated to the cemetery grounds in Brooklyn.

Some feminists have proposed "reversing" the statue, replacing the man with a woman, possibility with Liberty and with naked men representing a sex offender and a murderer.
