= USS Maine National Monument =

Monument in Manhattan, New York, U.S.

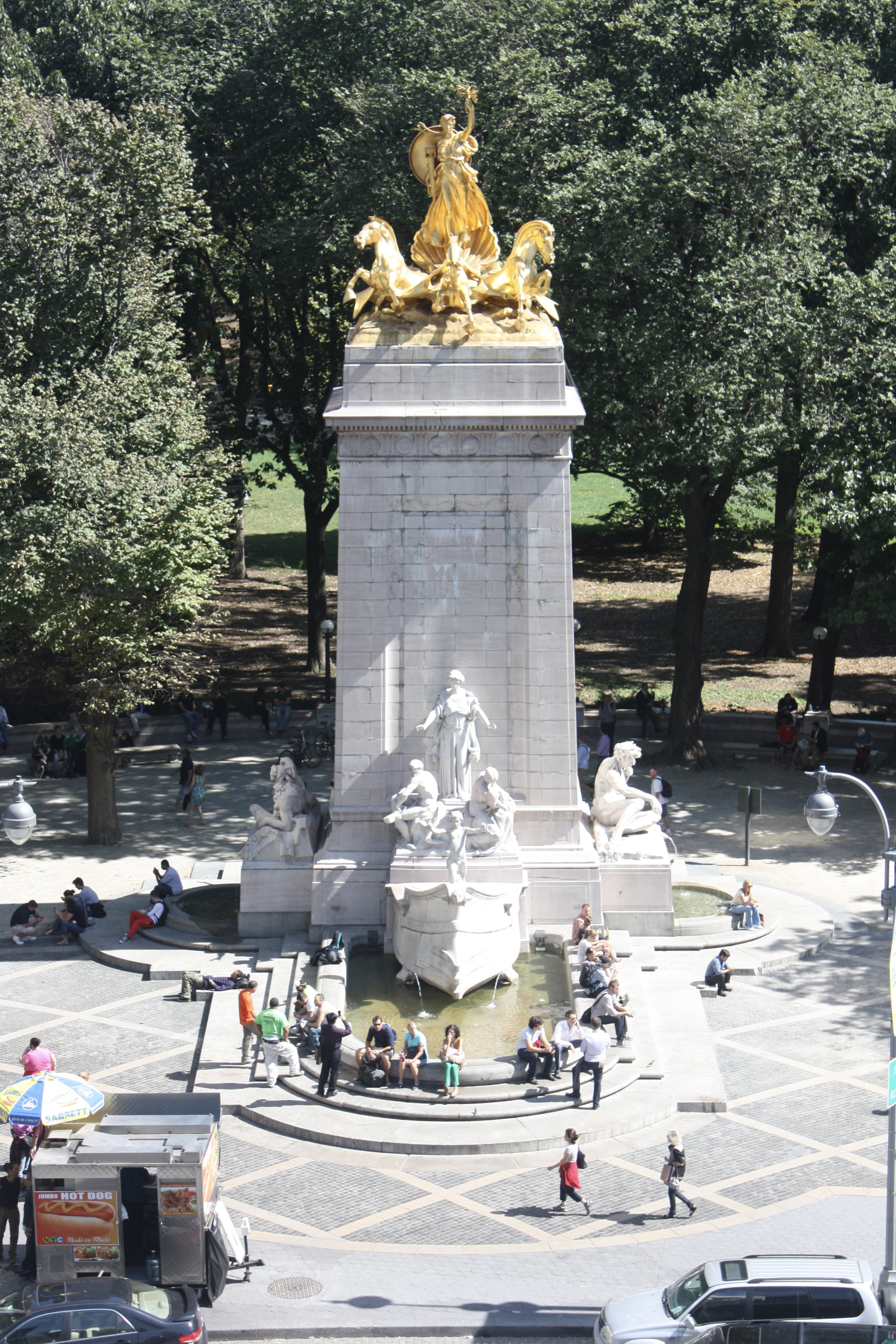
- The monument in 2012
- Location in New York City
- Year: 1912
- Type: Fountain; sculpture
- Location: New York City, New York, United States; 40.768242°N 73.981012°W

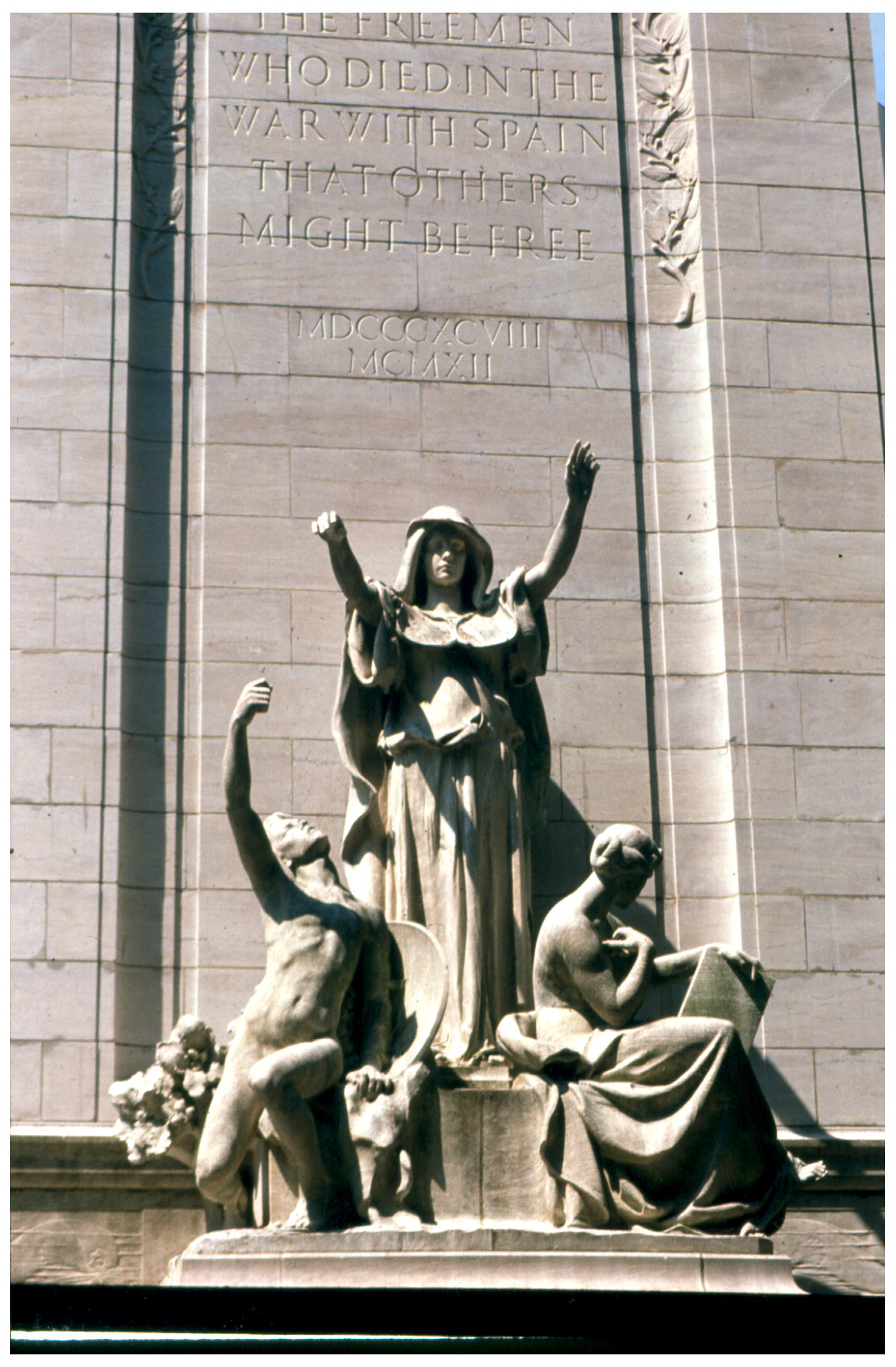
The group of three sculpted figures

The USS Maine National Monument is an outdoor monument located at the Merchants' Gate entrance to Central Park, at Columbus Circle, in Manhattan, New York City. It was cast on September 1, 1912 and dedicated on May 30, 1913 to the men killed aboard USS Maine (ACR-1) when the ship exploded in Havana Harbor.

In 1913, a USS Maine Monument designed by Harold Van Buren Magonigle was completed and dedicated in New York City. The monument consists of a pylon with a fountain at its base and sculptures by Attilio Piccirilli surrounding it. A sculpture group of gilded bronze figures atop the pylon represent Columbia Triumphant, her seashell chariot being drawn by three hippocampi, modeled by Audrey Munson. The bronze for this group reportedly came from metal recovered from the guns of the Maine. On the park side of the monument is fixed a memorial plaque that was cast in metal salvaged from the ship. It is not known how many of these plaques by sculptor Charles Keck were produced, but they can be found in many locations across the United States. They were cast by the Jno Williams Bronze Foundry and widely publicized.

On April 22, 2021, the memorial was vandalized during a protest in Columbus Circle. The memorial was sprayed with graffiti including "ACAB" (meaning all cops are bastards) and "Stonewall was a Riot" (in reference to the Stonewall Riots that occurred in Greenwich Village on June 28, 1969).
