= Tobacco barn =

Barn used for curing tobacco

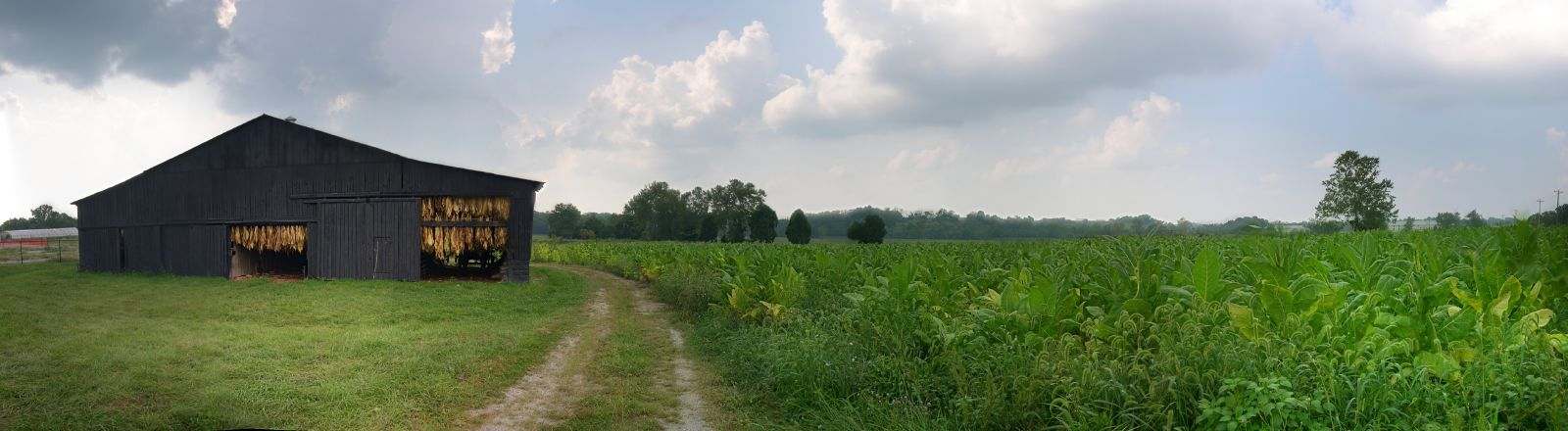

The tobacco barn, a type of functionally classified barn found in the USA, was once an essential ingredient in the process of air-curing tobacco. In the 21st century they are fast disappearing from the landscape in places where they were once ubiquitous. The barns have declined with the tobacco industry in general, and U.S. States such as Maryland actively discourage tobacco farming. When the US tobacco industry was at its height, tobacco barns were found everywhere the crop was grown. Tobacco barns were as unique as each area in which they were erected, and there is no one design that can be described as a tobacco barn.

== History ==
The terminology "tobacco barn" has been used to describe myriad structures in the USA. Buildings used for strictly tobacco curing, buildings that have multiple agricultural uses, and dilapidated barns, among others, have all been called tobacco barns at one time or another. In the Connecticut River Valley (Tobacco Valley) which extends through Connecticut, Massachusetts and up to Vermont, the curing "barns" are properly called "sheds" (tobacco sheds). The term "barn" is exclusively used to refer to structures that house livestock in this area (New England). When referring to any tobacco operation in this area, whether shade or broadleaf, the term "shed" is the proper term to use.

=== Design ===
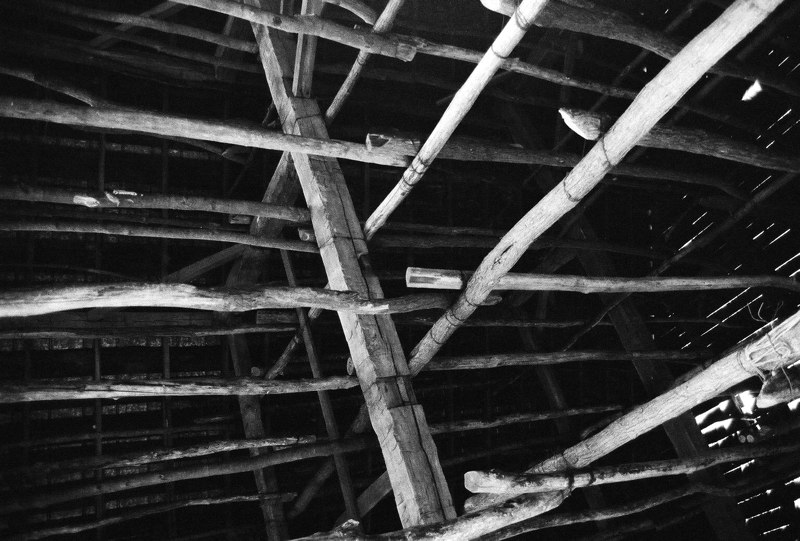
Interior of an aging tobacco barn in West Virginia

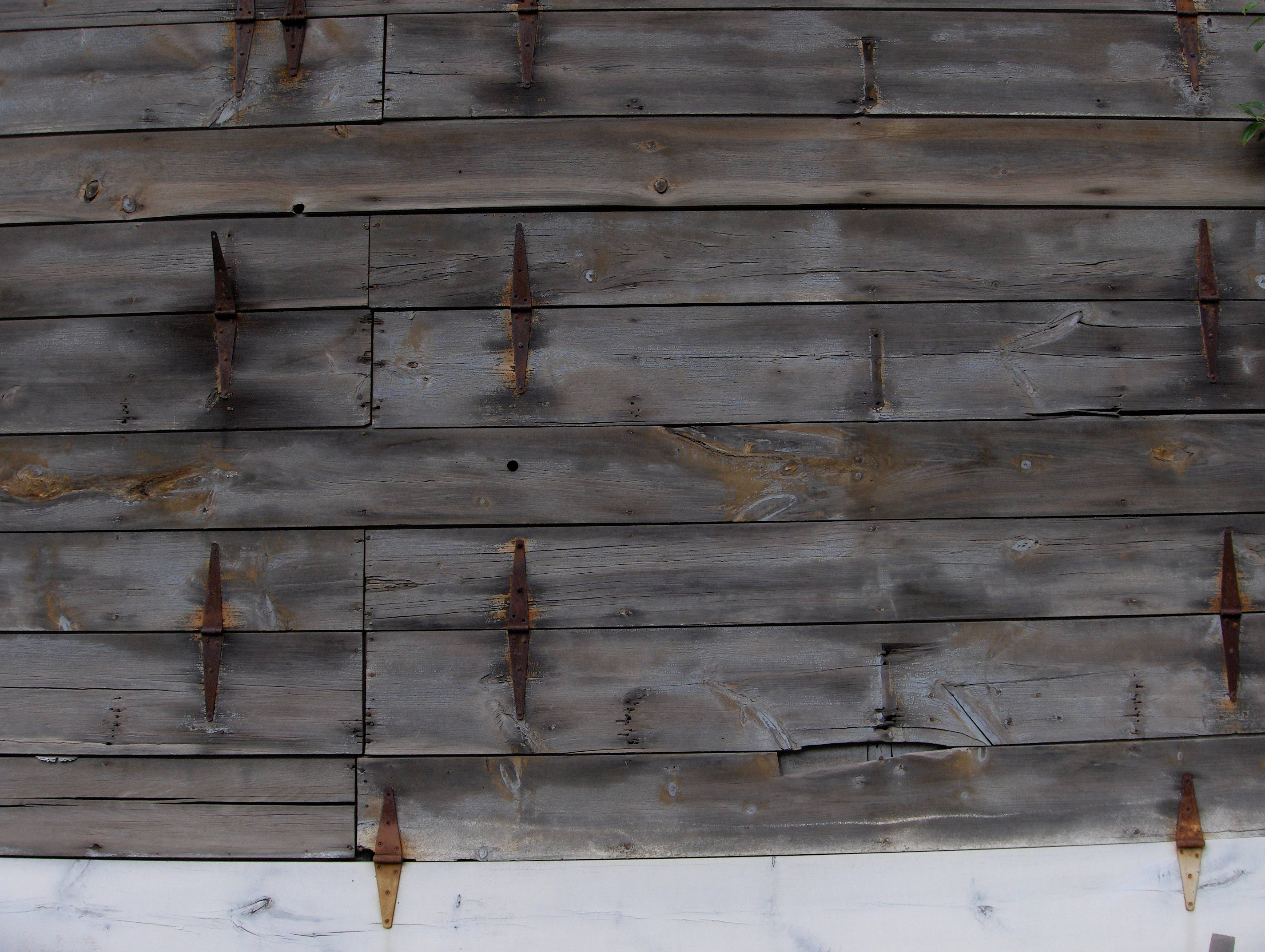
Tobacco barn hinge

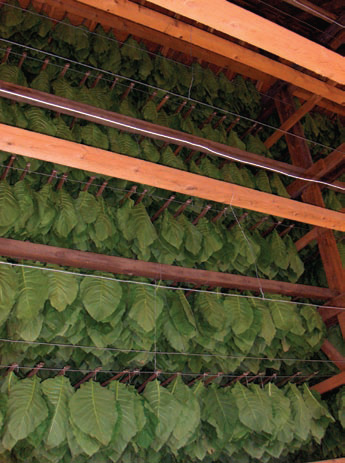
Tobacco leaves drying in a Connecticut barn

Though tobacco barn designs varied greatly there were elements that were found in many US tobacco barns. Design elements which were common include: gabled roofs, frame construction, and some system of ventilation. The venting can appear in different incarnations but commonly hinges would be attached to some of the cladding boards, so that they could be opened. Often the venting system would be more elaborate, including a roof ventilation system. In addition, tobacco barns do cross over into other barn styles of their day. Some common types of barn designs integrated into tobacco barns include, English barns and bank barns.

Each farmer has his favorite venting systems that are built not only for the winds but for efficiency. Right after the tobacco is hung, the vents are opened during the day in an effort to begin the important process of shedding water from the tobacco known as the curing of tobacco. Tobacco is often cured at specific temperatures and humidities, depending on where the tobacco is being cured, and also what the finished tobacco leaf is supposed to taste like. Cigar companies each have their own curing "recipes." Each leaf loses approximately eighty percent of its own weight by the time the curing process has successfully finished. In the first two weeks of the curing process, about an acre of hanging tobacco loses about five tons of water.

The vents are used to slow the drying process down which allows for a critical chemical break down to occur, turning the leaf from green to yellow to brown. To maintain ideal curing temperatures over the course of the curing process, farmers not only rely on the vents but on heat. While charcoal fires have been replaced in many barns with propane heaters, both methods help reduce moisture. With all of the variables that can impact the curing process, it is no wonder that the unique design of the tobacco barn has remained constant as a time-tested method for drying tobacco.

The interior framing would be set up in bents up ten feet, but more often about four feet apart horizontally, so that laths (also called "tobacco sticks") with tobacco attached to them could be hung for drying. The tier poles were often supported by posts and cross beams, the space in between known as the "bents." The bents ranged in vertical spacing from 20 inches to five feet wide. The bent itself became an important earmarker in determining crop volume. Farmers would commonly refer to barn size in terms of bents and the rule of thumb was one bent will hang half an acre of tobacco. In some areas, bents were called "rooms," even though this just defined a narrow and tall division of the inside of the barn by the tier poles. In North Carolina, for instance, bents were called rooms, and a typical barn for curing flue cured tobacco was four rooms in size.

== Current state ==
U.S. states, such as Maryland, have sponsored programs which discourage the cultivation of tobacco. In 2001 Maryland's state-sponsored program offered cash payments as buyouts to tobacco farmers. A majority of the farmers took the buyout, and hundreds of historic tobacco barns were rendered instantly obsolete. As tobacco barns disappear, farmers have been forced to change their methods for curing the crop. In Kentucky, instead of curing tobacco attached to laths in vented tobacco barns as they once did, farmers are increasingly curing tobacco on "scaffolds" in the fields. The 1805 Tracy's Landing Tobacco House No. 2 located at Tracy's Landing, Maryland, was listed on the National Register of Historic Places in 1982.

== See also ==
- Category:Agricultural buildings and structures on the National Register of Historic Places
- Tobacco in the United States
