= St. Anne's Church (Annapolis, Maryland) =

Historic church in Maryland, US

Coordinates: 38°58′42.4″N 76°29′34″W

St. Anne's Episcopal Church
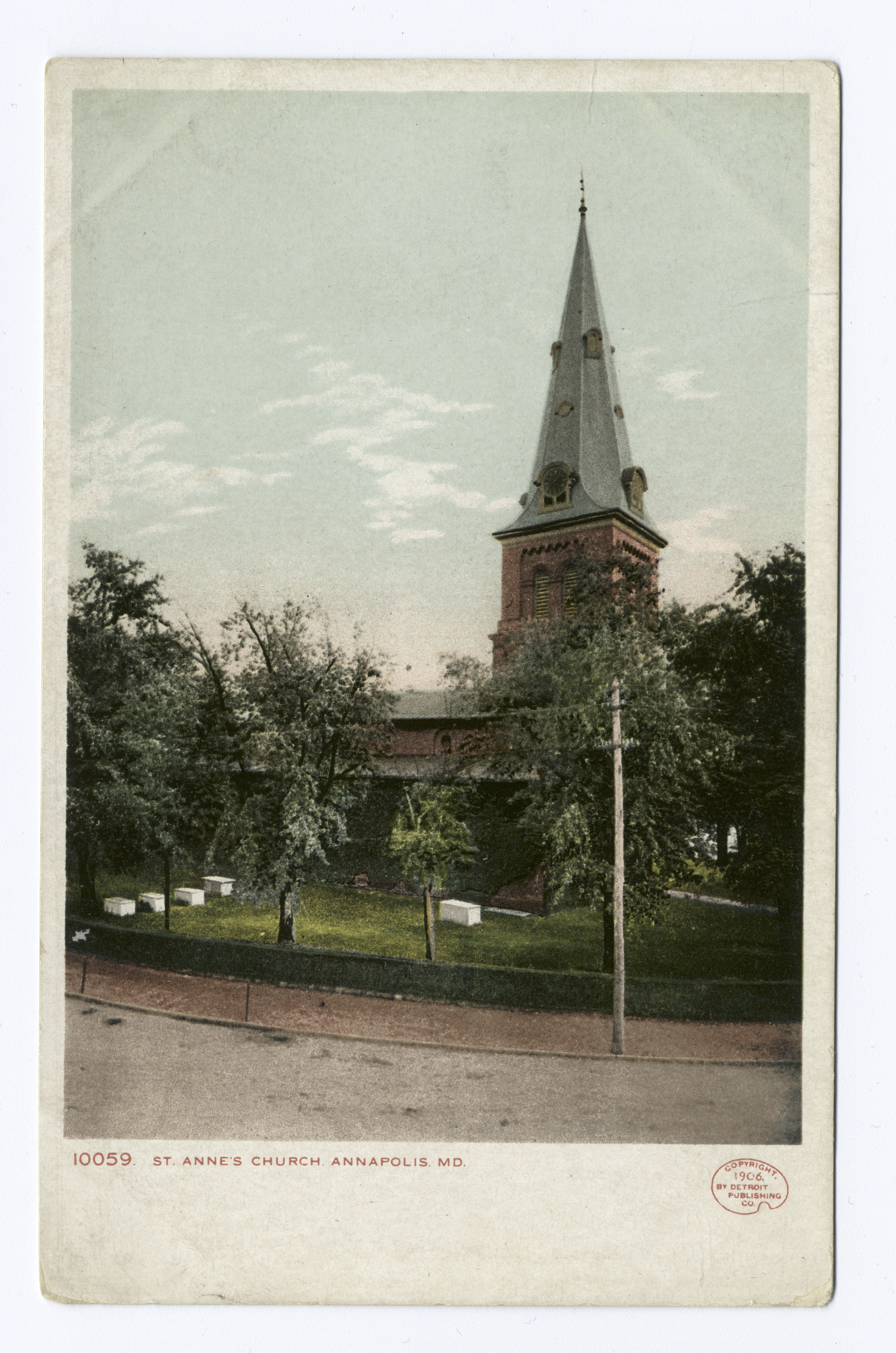
- St. Anne's Church in 1906
- St. Anne's Episcopal Church
- Location: 199 Duke Of Gloucester St, Annapolis, MD 21401
- Country: United States
- Denomination: Episcopal
- Website: Official Website

History
- Founded: 1692

Architecture
- Years built: First Church- 1704; Second Church- 1792; Third Church- 1858

Administration
- Diocese: Maryland

Clergy
- Rector: The Rev. Canon Manoj Mathew Zacharia, Ph.D.

St. Anne's Episcopal Church is a historic Episcopal church located in Church Circle, Annapolis. The first church in Annapolis, it was founded in 1692 to serve as the parish church for the newly created Middle Neck Parish, one of the original 30 Anglican parishes in the Province of Maryland. It remains in use by the Parish of St. Anne, part of the Episcopal Diocese of Maryland.

== History ==
=== First church, colonial era: 1704-1775 ===
St. Anne's was founded in 1692 after the passing of the Establishment Act. The Act allowed for the construction of the State House, King William's School, and St. Anne's, though due to the limited work force and insufficient funds, all of the projects were finished much later than expected. In 1694 the capital of Maryland was moved to Annapolis and the royal governor, Francis Nicholson, laid out a street plan centered on two circles, the larger for the State House and the smaller for the church, where St. Anne's is situated to this day.

Work started out slowly. The General Assembly did not allocate funds until 1695 and 1696. In 1699 specified that the dimensions of the church were to be 65 ft wide (20 m) and 30 ft long (9.1 m) with a porch and a tower that would hang a bell. The contractor, Edward Dorsey, was fired however, and fined 333 pounds for failure to work on the building. The building was not completed until some time after 1700, though in use by 1704, with some changes made to the structure in later years. It served Chapel Royal until 1715, when the Province of Maryland was returned to Lord Baltimore. A bell, which would call parishioners to services until it was destroyed by fire in 1858, was donated to St. Anne's by Queen Anne.

In 1758, Benedict Swingate Calvert (c.1730-1788), the illegitimate son of Charles Calvert, 5th Baron Baltimore, the third Proprietor Governor of Maryland, was married to his cousin, Elizabeth Calvert, in St Anne's Church, by the Reverend John Gordon. Elizabeth was the daughter of Maryland Governor Captain Charles Calvert Butler. The parish also became the focus of a dual patronage scandal in 1776-68, under its 17th rector, Bennet Allen and Governor Horatio Sharpe. Allen also acquired the living at St. James Herring Bay and attempted to hire it out, contrary to Maryland law and the vestry's instructions. Allen ultimately gave up St. Anne's (but not St. James) upon securing the most lucrative parish in the Colony, All Saints Church in Frederick, Maryland, although that vestry locked him out shortly after his arrival and forced him to flee to Philadelphia and hire a curate, before returning to England during the American Revolutionary War.

Nearly half of St. Anne's rectors, 21, served in the pre-Revolutionary period; many evidently left for better pay at other parishes in the region. Additionally, St. Anne's was often referred to by writers of the time as a "barn" rather than a "proper place of worship." Many locals asked the government for a new church in 1775. Their wish was granted, and in late 1775, the church was razed.

=== Second church: 1792-1858 ===
After the original church was razed, the local government made plans to build a new church which was to be designed by Joseph Horatio Anderson, who was the architect of the State House. Unfortunately, construction had to be cancelled since it was planned at the beginning of the Revolutionary War. The bricks and timber that were to be used to build to new church were sent to the Severn River to build a fort, and most of the work force went off to fight. During the War, St. Anne's parishioners worshiped at St. William's School, but as that began to become inadequate, a building was built on West Street as a temporary place for worship.

After the War officially ended with the Treaty of Paris in 1783, the newly founded United States went into economic depression due to severe war debts and dislocation of accustomed trading patterns. This cause a further delay on the new church building's construction. Finally, in 1792, the new St. Anne's church was finished. It was much larger and more structurally secure than its predecessor. It was consecrated in 1792 by Bishop of Maryland Thomas John Claggett, the first Bishop of Maryland and a curate in the old church.

On February 14, 1858, a furnace fire practically destroyed the interior of the building. Most of the original documents from the old church burned, and a new church building was requested.

=== Third church: 1858-present ===
The third and present church was built in 1858. It was designed in a Romanesque Revival style and incorporated a portion of the old tower. Most of the church was built in that year, apart from the steeple which was finished in 1866 due to the Civil War. At the request of the city, a town clock was housed in the tower, and continues to be maintained by the city.

== Burials in the churchyard ==
- Nicholas Greenberry
- Thomas Lynch
