= Bennet Allen =

English priest (1761–1792)

Bennet Allen (fl. 1761–1792) was an English priest and writer.

== Early life ==
He was born to a family with many clerics and educated at Wadham College, Oxford, where he took the degree of B.A. 16 November 1757, and that of M.A. 12 July 1760. Although he subsequently took holy orders (ordained Deacon by the Bishop of Oxford in 1759 and priest by the same bishop in 1761) and settled in London, his writings and conduct proved him singularly unfitted.

== Career ==
Patronised by leaders of society of doubtful reputation, Allen apparently obtained a livelihood for some time by pandering in the press to the fashionable vices of the age. His first work, a 'Poem inscribed to his Britannic Majesty,’ published in 1761, shortly after the accession of George III of Great Britain, is unobjectionable; but circa 1768 he is generally credited with aiding the son of the Marquis of Granby to defend Lord Baltimore, who was awaiting his trial in Newgate on a charge of rape, by the publication of an anonymous pamphlet entitled 'Modern Chastity; or the Agreeable Rape, a poem by a young gentleman of sixteen in vindication of the Right Hon. Lord B——e.' The production chiefly consists of a coarse attack on the Methodist sect, to which the prosecutrix in the case against Lord Baltimore belonged. It is attributed to Allen on the fairly certain ground of a contemporary manuscript note in the copy at the British Museum, stating it to be 'undoubtedly by the well-known Rev. Bennet Allen.' Horace Walpole is believed to refer to this work and to another on a kindred topic, of which Allen is also assumed to be the author, in a letter to the Countess of Ossory, dated 5 January 1774. 'The present Lord Granby (who had succeeded to the title in 1770),’ he writes, 'is an author, and has written a poem on "Charity" (i.e. a probable misreading for 'Chastity'), and in prose a "Modest Apology for Adultery". . . . They say his lordship writes in concert with a very clever young man, whose name I have forgotten.' A shilling pamphlet, entitled 'A Modest Apology for the prevailing Practice of Adultery,’ was announced for publication in August 1773 in the 'Gentleman's Magazine' (p. 398), but nothing further is known of it, and it may possibly have been suppressed.

Rev. Allen traveled to Maryland in 1767, arriving with a letter from Lord Baltimore directing the governor to give him whatever he wished in the province. An arranged change of rectorships allowed Allen to obtain the living of St. Anne's parish in Annapolis, and he became the chaplain for and a drinking buddy of Governor Horatio Sharpe. Rev. Allen also soon secured the living at St. James Herring Bay, although having such dual positions was illegal in the colony at the time, his plan to rent out the glebe flouted the vestry's conditional acceptance, and his remark that the £300/yr living could barely pay his alcohol budget inflamed many. Allen gave up the position at St. Anne's (but not St. James) when he secured the most lucrative parish in the colony, All Saints Church in Frederick, Maryland (worth £1000 sterling annually), after the early death of the scholarly incumbent, Rev. Thomas Bacon. Rev. Allen technically served for seven years until the American Revolutionary War, but the vestry locked him out of the church almost immediately after learning of the ongoing St. James situation, causing him to flee to Philadelphia and hire a curate long before he fled back to England.

== Return to England ==
In subsequent years Allen contributed largely to the ‘Morning Post’ In an anonymous article, called 'Characters of Principal Men of the [American] Rebellion,’ which appeared there on 29 June 1779, he vehemently attacked the character of (American rebel) Daniel Dulany, formerly secretary of Maryland and a parishioner at St. Anne's who had publicly chastised Allen in the street and a series of articles in the 'Maryland Gazette' (to which Allen had disingenuously replied as "Bystander"). On 1 July the 'Morning Post' withdrew the charges against Dulany, but Lloyd Dulany, a brother of the subject of the alleged libel, publicly challenged its anonymous author in the newspaper. Allen did not appear declare himself the article's writer immediately, but after a long interval a duel was arranged. On 18 June 1782, Dulany was killed in the duel. Allen and his second, Robert Morris, surrendered themselves on 5 July of the same year, to answer a charge of murder at the Old Bailey sessions. After a trial, which attracted general public attention, Allen, in spite of his plea for benefit of clergy and the evidence as to his character adduced by Lords Bateman, Mountnorris, and many fashionable ladies, was convicted of manslaughter (but Morris acquitted), and sentenced to a fine of one shilling and six months' imprisonment.

== Death ==
Allen's death is not recorded, although a Maryland scholar whose lifetime overlapped his wrote that he died in poverty, intemperate and degraded, in London.
