= St. James' Parish (Lothian, Maryland) =

Historic church in Maryland, US

- St. James Church
- U.S. National Register of Historic Places
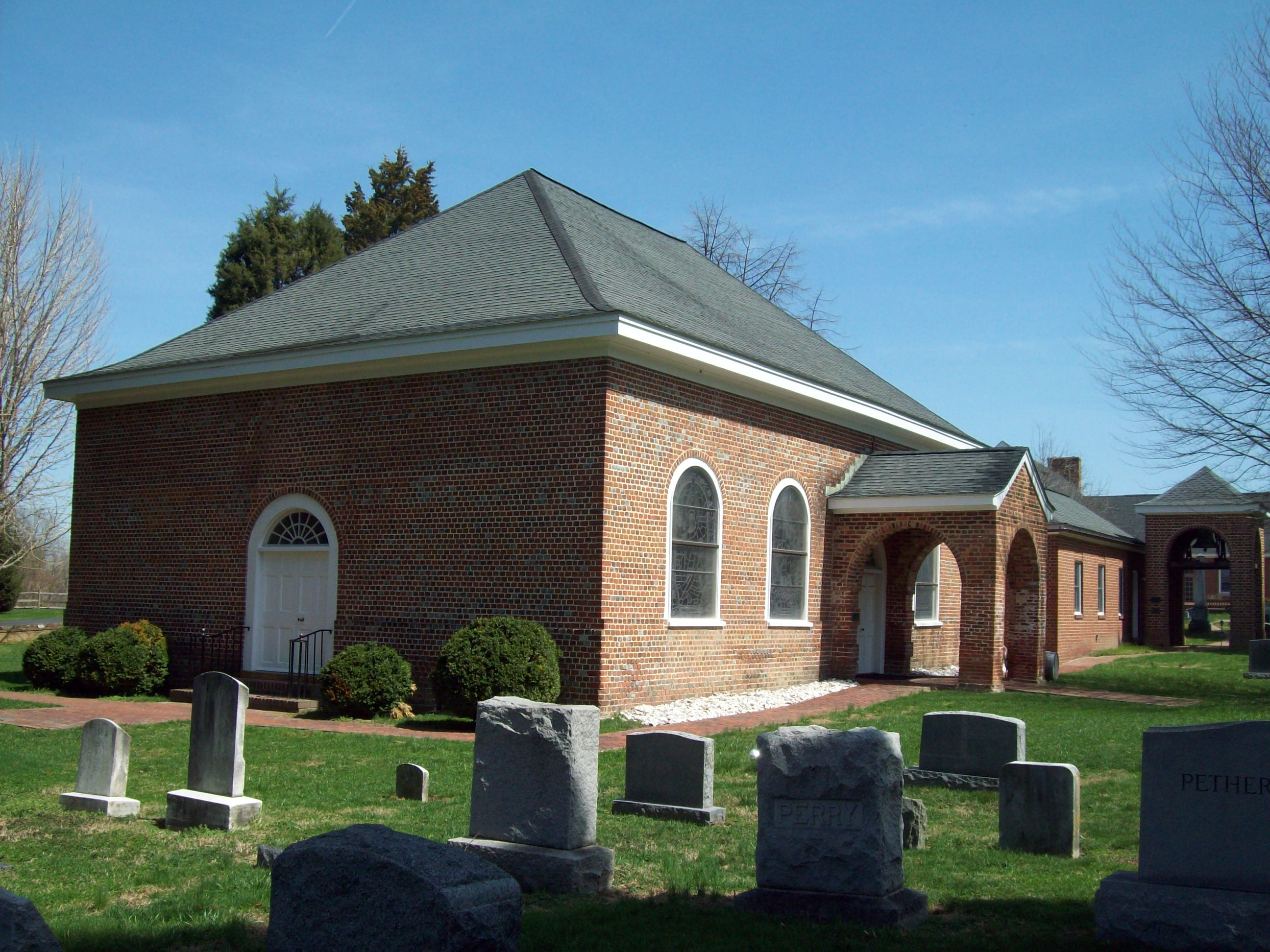
- St. James' Parish, March 2010

- Location within Maryland Location within the United States
- Nearest city: Bristol, Maryland
- Coordinates: 38°47′23″N 76°35′55″W
- Built: 1763
- NRHP reference No.: 72000565
- Added to NRHP: May 7, 1972

St. James' Parish is a historic church located on Solomons Island Road in the hamlet of Tracys Landing, Anne Arundel County, Maryland, United States.

== History ==
In 1692, St. James' Parish, Old Herring Creeke, was officially established when the Maryland General Assembly, acting on the orders of Sir Lionel Copley, Royal Governor of Maryland, enacted the Act of Establishment. That Act divided the Province of Maryland into 30 Anglican parishes. There were, however, people worshiping in the area before that time. The exact location of that church is unknown. In 1695, the vestry ordered a church built on the present site in Lothian.

In 1698, St. James' Parish opened the first parochial lending library of the American parishes of the Church of England. The Rev. Dr. Thomas Bray donated 118 books for the library that year.

The Reverend Henry Hall was called as the first rector, and remained at St. James' until his death in 1722. When the old church became inadequate for the parish's needs in 1763, the vestry ordered that a new church be built. It was completed in 1765, and continues to serve the congregation today. However, the politically connected curate appointed in 1768, Rev. Bennet Allen, caused a scandal by refusing to live in the parish and instead proposing to rent out the glebe and combine the salary (which he insisted insufficient even for his bar tab) with that of another parish (at first St. Anne' Church, then even further away All Saints Church (Frederick, Maryland)). The next incumbent, Rev. Walter Magowan, installed later that year, was a friend of George Washington and served until 1784.

In 1792, his successor and the seventh rector of St. James', the Rev. Dr. Thomas John Claggett, resigned to become the first Bishop of Maryland. Rt.Rev. Claggett was the first Episcopal bishop to be consecrated on American soil.

The parish founded several chapels: St. Mark's Chapel at Friendship, consecrated in 1850 and sold in 1915; The Chapel of St. James the Less in Owensville in 1853 (now Christ Church, West River); St. James' Chapel in Tracys Landing in 1876; and St. Mark's Chapel built in 1924.

The church was listed on the National Register of Historic Places in 1972. The property includes a cemetery which includes what is believed to be the oldest dated grave in the state (1655).

== Gallery ==
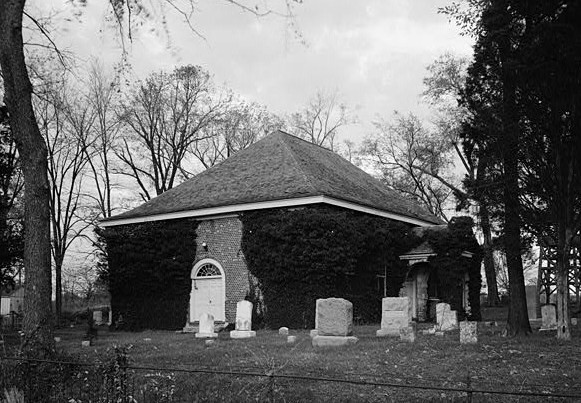
St. James Parish Episcopal Church in 1936

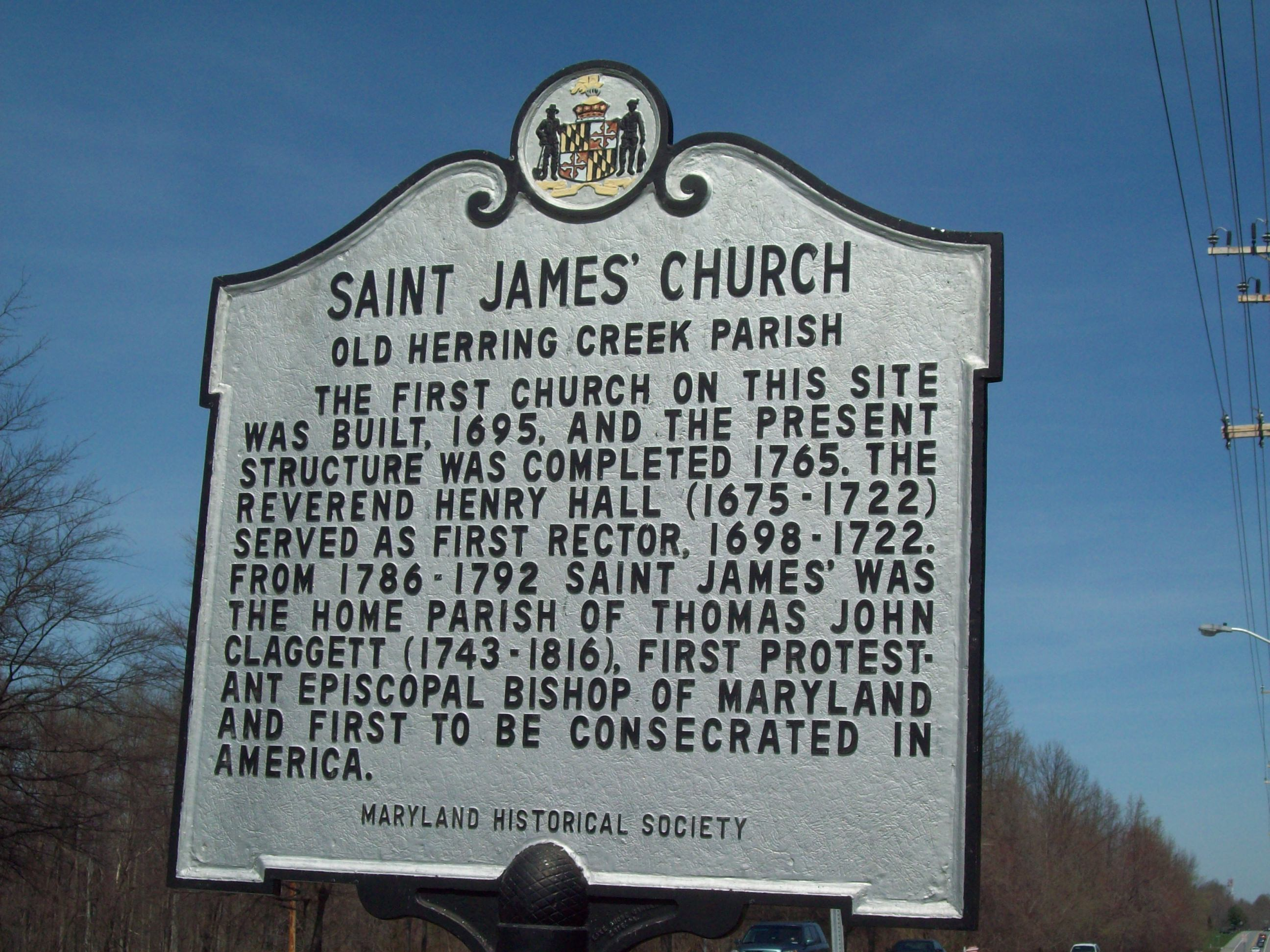
St. James' Parish Historic Marker, March 2010

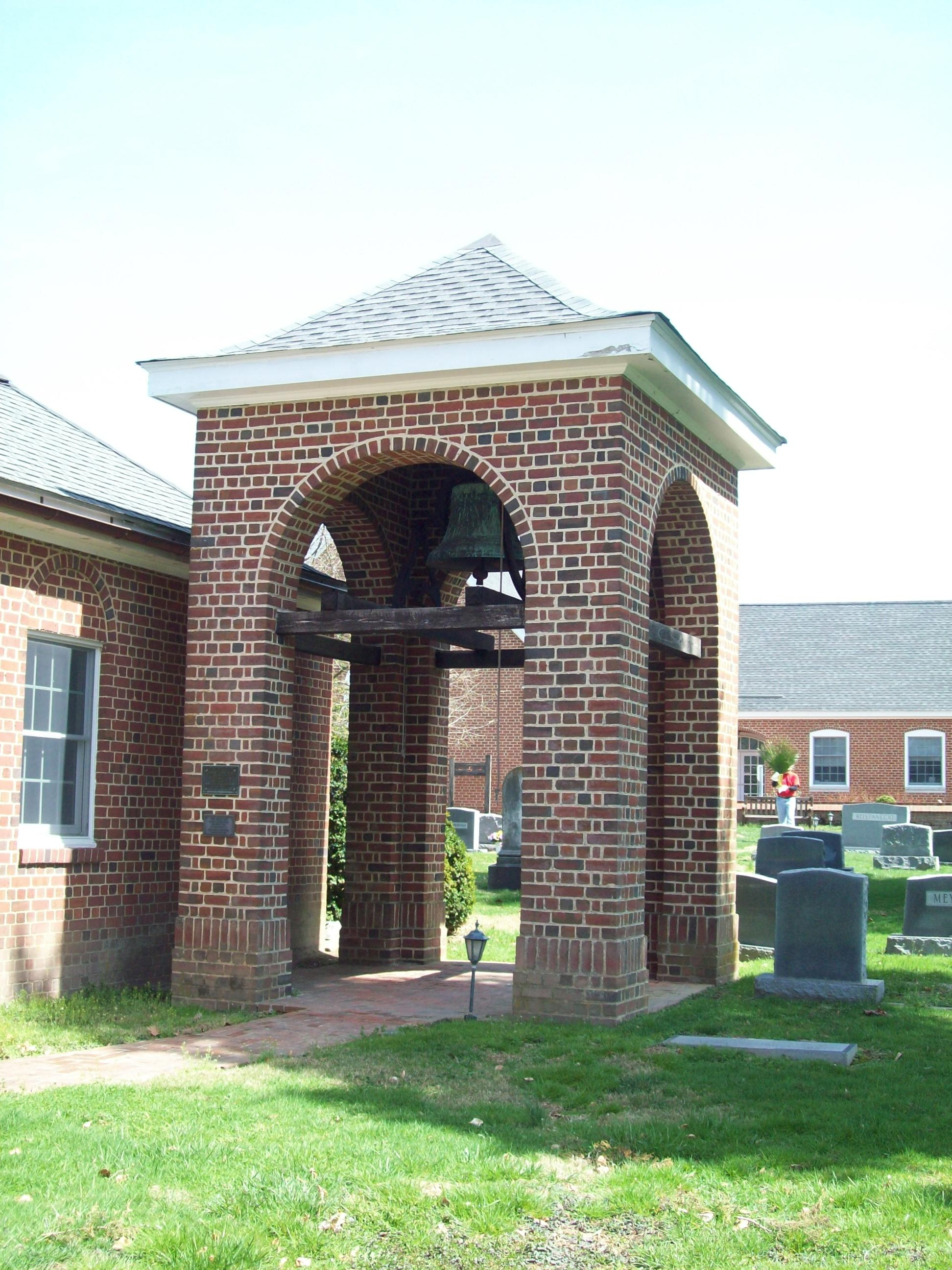
St. James' Parish Belfry Detail, March 2010

== See also ==
- National Register of Historic Places listings in Anne Arundel County, Maryland
