= Tracy's Landing Tobacco House No. 2 =

- U.S. National Register of Historic Places
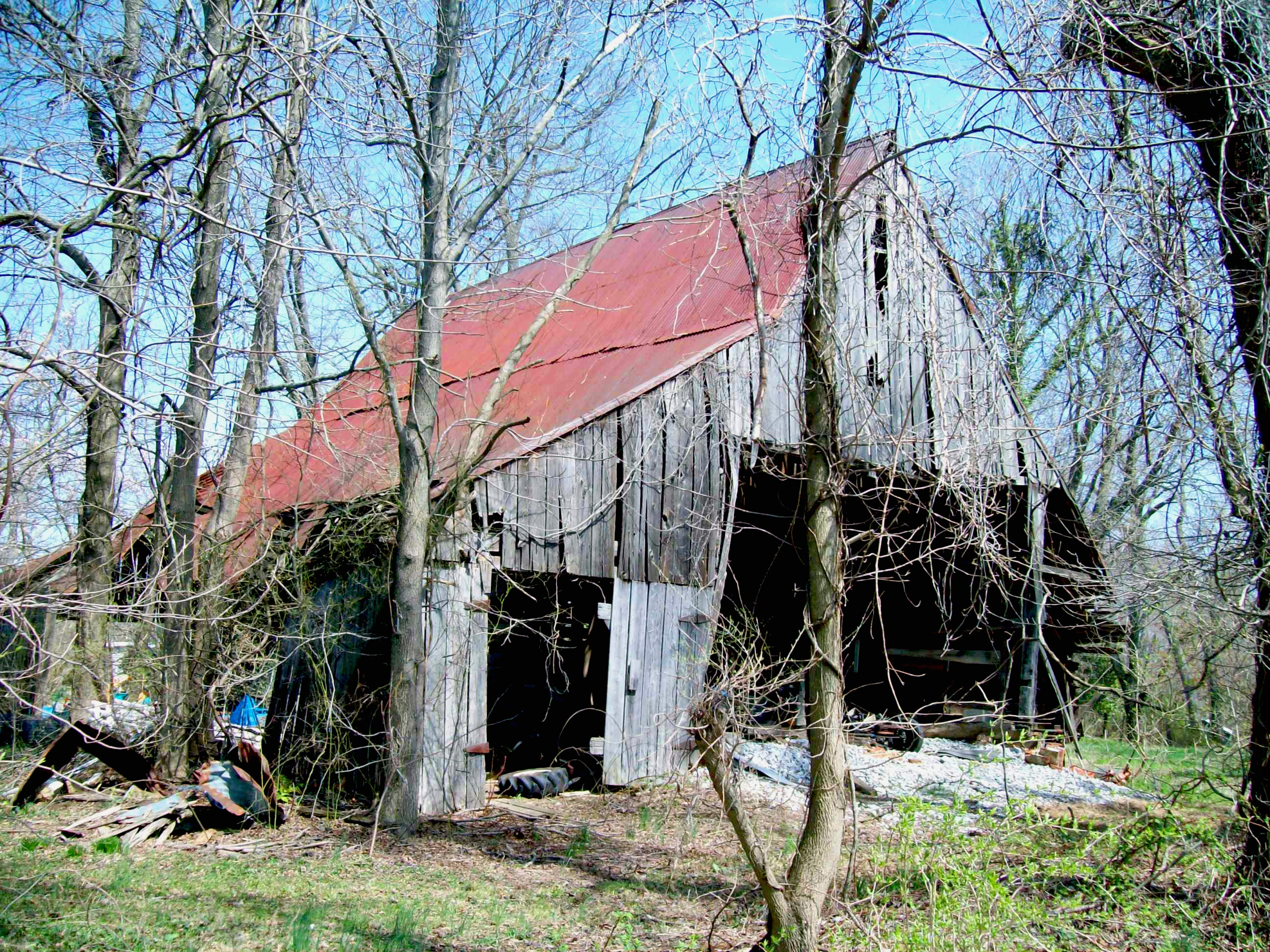
- Tracy's Landing Tobacco House #2, March 2010

- Location within Maryland Location within the United States
- Nearest city: Tracy's Landing, Maryland
- Coordinates: 38°46′55″N 76°35′29″W
- Built: 1805
- NRHP reference No.: 82001580
- Added to NRHP: November 30, 1982

Tracy's Landing Tobacco House No. 2 is a historic tobacco barn at Tracy's Landing, Anne Arundel County, Maryland. It is a 24’3" by 45’2" heavy timber framed tobacco barn with a construction date of 1805. It is the earliest identified tobacco house extant in Anne Arundel County, and is one of the earliest recorded examples of this type of agricultural building in Tidewater Maryland.

It was listed on the National Register of Historic Places in 1982.
