= All Saints Church (Frederick, Maryland) =

Coordinates: 39°24′55″N 77°24′46″W

All Saints Episcopal Church Frederick
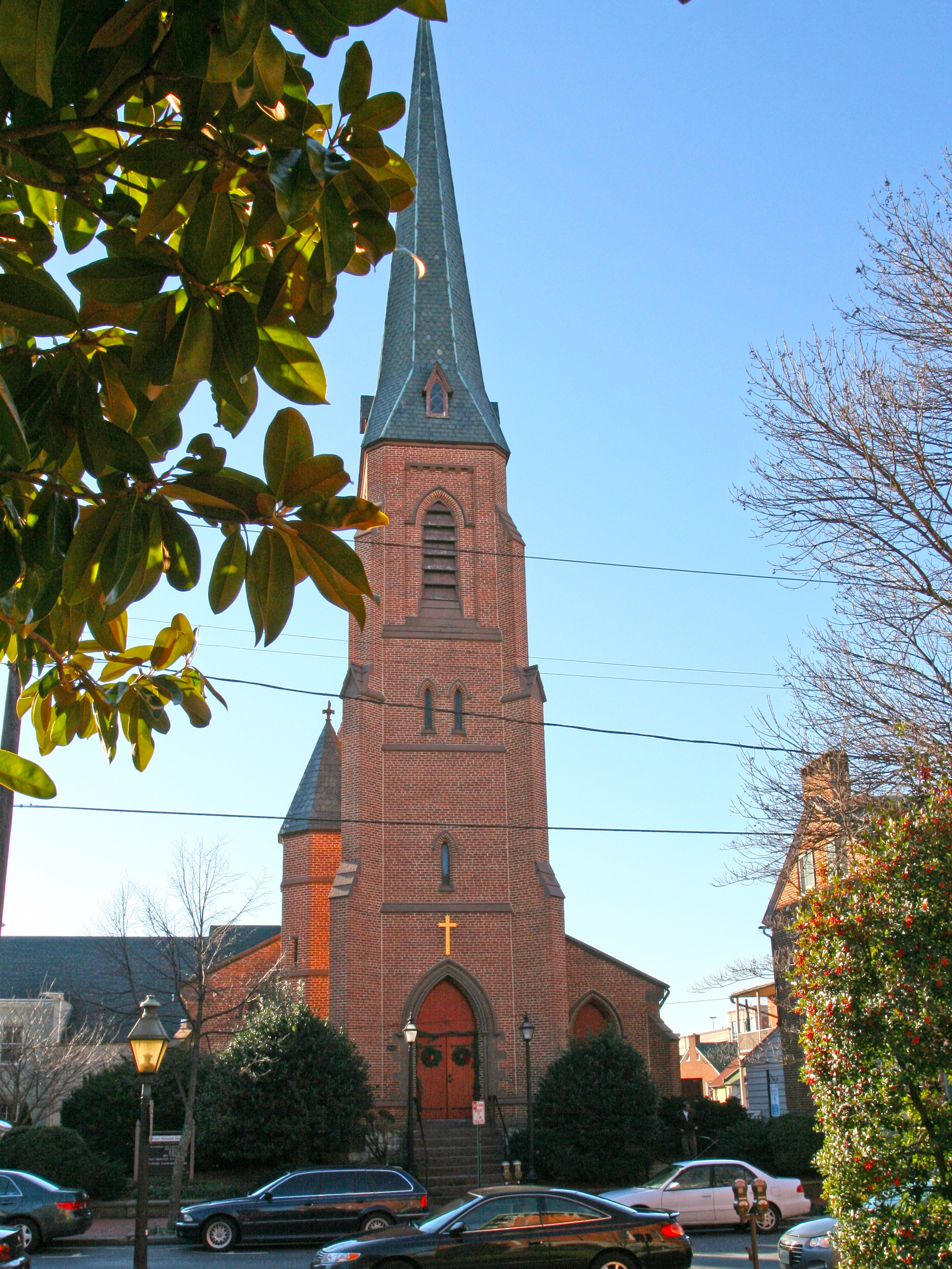
- All Saints Episcopal Church; Frederick
- Location: Frederick, Maryland, United States
- Denomination: Episcopal
- Churchmanship: Broad church

History
- Status: Parish church
- Founded: 1742
- Founder: Maryland General Assembly
- Dedication: All Saints

Architecture
- Functional status: Active
- Architect: Richard Upjohn
- Architectural type: Church
- Style: Gothic Revival
- Groundbreaking: 1855
- Completed: 1860
- Construction cost: $28,800

Specifications
- Capacity: 300

Administration
- Province: Third
- Diocese: Maryland
- Parish: All Saints Parish

All Saints Church, or All Saints Episcopal Church, founded in 1742, is a historic Episcopal church now located at 106 West Church Street in the Historic District of Frederick, Maryland. It is the seat of All Saints Parish, Diocese of Maryland, which covers most of Frederick County, Maryland and once covered most of Western Maryland.

== History ==
=== Founding and Colonial Era ===
In 1742, Maryland's General Assembly separated the westernmost parts of the vast Piscataway (Broad Creek Church) parish to form the large "All Saints Parish". In 1747, Maryland's Assembly provided for buying land and constructing the parish church on Carroll's Creek, as well as chapels of ease between the Monocacy and Seneca Creeks (which ultimately became Poolesville) and another between the Antietam and Cannogocheague Creeks (which became Hagerstown). In 1770, legislation provided for separating Eden (or Zion or St. Peter's) parishes as well as St. John's Parish, Hagerstown, but such never became effective before the American Revolution. In 1786, Maryland's General Assembly separated the westernmost parts of the congregation to create a new "Frederick Parish" named for Frederick Calvert, the last colonial governor of Maryland, and elevated the former chapel at Hagerstown, Maryland to the parish church.

The original All Saints building, built in 1750, was about four blocks away from the buildings constructed in the next century. In 1759, Rev. Thomas Bacon, former rector of St. Peter's Church in Talbot County, was appointed third "reader" of the parish, which by then was the colony's richest with an income of £400 sterling, but he was expected to first compile the laws of Maryland in Annapolis. This caused local consternation such that Rev. Bacon agreed to hire a priest to help him in the 100 mile by 30 mile parish, and moved to Frederick in 1762 upon receiving Governor Sharpe's assent to his appointment, which proved to be his last (he died in 1768).

Bacon's successor, Bennet Allen, the black sheep of a noted clerical family in England, technically served for seven years, but caused a scandal for his lack of learning as well as insistence upon holding another living (St. James Herring Bay) at the same time, contrary to colonial legislation but supposedly authorized by the Lord Proprietor. The vestry almost immediately locked Allen out of the church. Though he climbed in a window to claim the living, Allen soon fled to Philadelphia, hiring a curate to handle the lucrative parish long before the American Revolutionary War (during which he fled to England and was ultimately convicted of killing Lord Dulany in a duel).

During the rectorship of the Rev. George Bower on March 24, 1793, Bishop Thomas John Claggett administered his first confirmation on ten members of All Saints Church. Bishop Claggett being the first Episcopal bishop consecrated on American soil, these ten were the first to be confirmed by an American bishop.

=== 19th Century ===
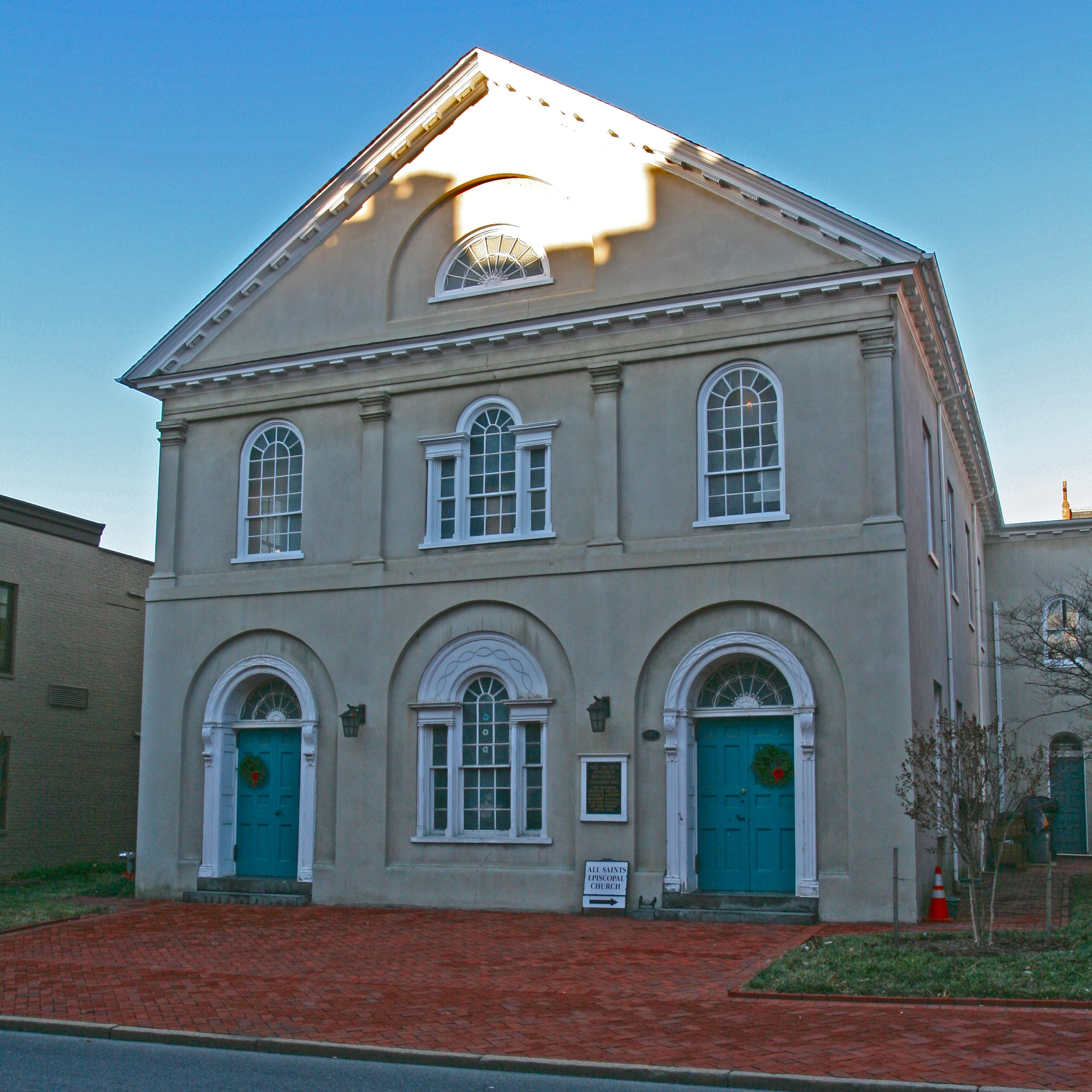
The second All Saints' Church on Court Street, completed in 1814.

As the population of Frederick grew in the late-18th and early-19th centuries, the need for a larger, more accessible church led the vestry of All Saints Parish to call for the construction of a new building on a lot purchased from Dr. Philip Thomas and Richard Potts on Court Street. The vestry raised subscriptions and held a lottery to obtain the funds to build the new church which was completed in 1814. Designed by Henry McCleery, the second All Saints' Church is an example of Federal design with Palladian influences. The first floor doors and window display a unique inter-woven design carved into their architraves. The second-floor windows are separated by stuccoed pilasters and a fanlight is centered in the pediment above. This new building was consecrated by Bishop Claggett on November 12, 1814.

The 1830s, 40s, and 50s were a tumultuous period for the parish, reflecting the social and political tensions which impacted the United States in this era. Successive pastorates waivered from traditional Low Church worship styles to more High Church preferences. On a more secular note, rectors of the parish in this period also held political views in favor of and against the institution of slavery, causing occasional controversy in the church. One of the rectors who served All Saints' during this time period was the Rev. William N. Pendleton who served as rector from 1847 to 1853 and later became a Brigadier General in the Confederate Army during the American Civil War.

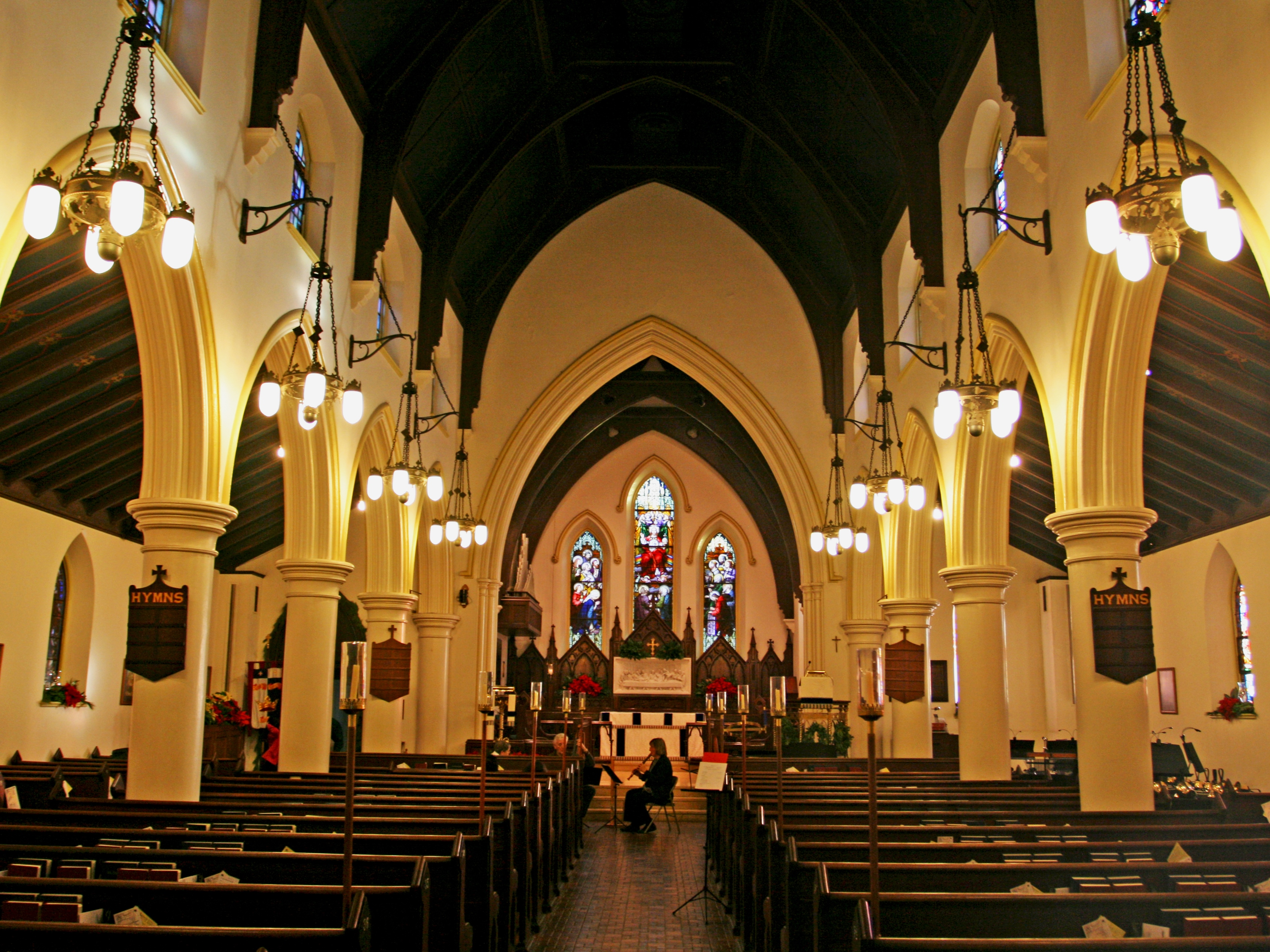
The interior of the 1855 church.

In 1853, the vestry of All Saints' Parish appointed a building committee to oversee the construction of a third, larger church. After corresponding with the firm of Richard Upjohn and Company of New York, plans for the new Gothic Revival-styled church were procured and the cornerstone was laid in 1855. The form of the new church incorporated a long nave with side aisles leading to a recessed chancel. A tall bell tower and spire was centered on the front facade, becoming a part of Frederick's famed "Clustered Spires." The construction was completed in 1856 and this church has been in continuous use by the parish since then. The 1814 building, which sits perpendicular to the third building, was converted for use as a parish hall.

During the American Civil War, All Saints Parish was led by Rev. Marmaduke M. Dillon, a Unionist who had served as an army officer. His pastorate was marked with friction among some of the parish's southern-sympathizing members. In the fall and winter of 1862-1863, the church was used as a field hospital during the Maryland Campaign, housing wounded soldiers from the Battles of South Mountain and Antietam. After the resignation of Rev. Dillon in 1866, the parish settled into a prolonged period of stability and growth under the leadership of Rev. Dr. Osbourne Ingle. He served as rector of All Saints' Parish from 1866 until his death in 1906, a span of 40 years. Dr. Ingles' eldest son, the Rev. James Addison Ingle, served as a missionary to China and as bishop in the Missionary District of Hankow.

== Architecture ==
The brickwork of the current seven-bay by three bay, two storey church is common bond, with brownstone trim and a high exposed fieldstone foundation. The sharp four storey tower at the front is one of the seven ecclesiastical towers for which Frederick was known in the Civil war. The quire windows were made in 1910 and imported from Munich. The east side clearstory windows were made in the style of Tiffany, and those on the western side in medieval style.

== See also ==
- Evangelical Lutheran Church (Frederick, Maryland)
