= Tracys Landing, Maryland =

Unincorporated community in Maryland, United States

- Unincorporated community
- Location within the state of Maryland Tracys Landing, Maryland (the United States)
- Coordinates: 38°46′48″N 76°35′45″W
- Country: United States
- State: Maryland
- County: Anne Arundel
- Elevation: 50 ft (15 m)
- Time zone: UTC-5 (Eastern (EST))
  - Summer (DST): UTC-4 (EDT)
- ZIP code: 20779
- Area codes: 410,443 and 667

Tracys Landing is an unincorporated community in Anne Arundel County, Maryland, United States. Tracy's Landing Tobacco House No. 2 was listed on the National Register of Historic Places in 1982. The St. James Church was listed on the National Register of Historic Places in 1972.

== Geography ==
Tracys Landing is adjacent to the waterfront town of Deale.
