= Thomas Bacon (priest) =

Anglican clergyman (c. 1711 - 1768)

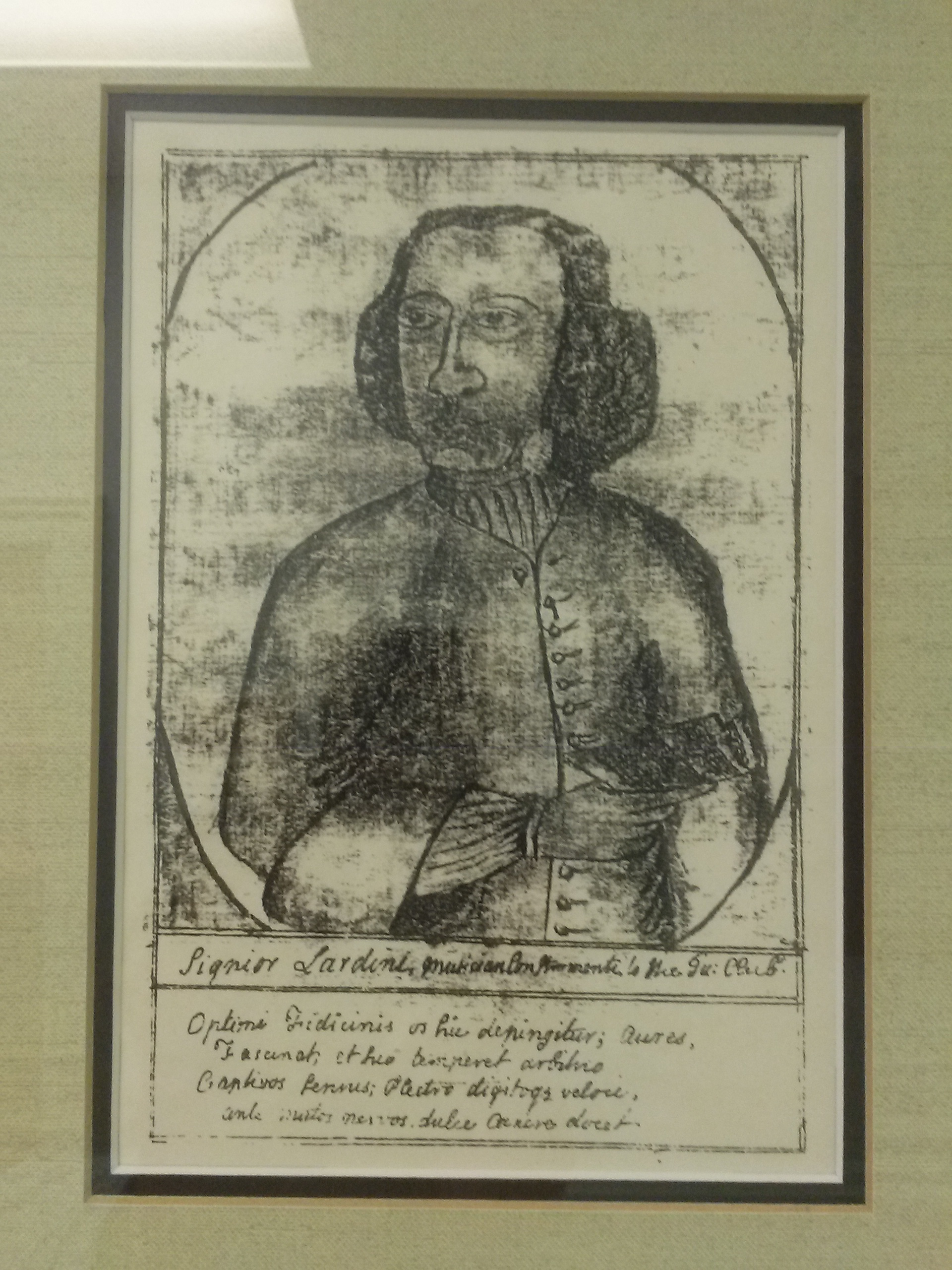
- Bacon when rector at All Saints' Church, Frederick
- Born: 1711/1712; Isle of Man
- Died: May 24, 1768 (aged 57); Frederick, Maryland, U.S.
- Resting place: Mount Olivet Cemetery; Frederick, Maryland, U.S.
- Occupations: Educator, priest
- Spouses: Unnamed first wife (m. 1741; died 1750) Elizabeth Bozman Belchier (m. 1756)
- Children: 5

Thomas Bacon (1711/1712 – 1768) was an Episcopal priest, musician, poet, publisher and author. Considered the most learned man in Maryland of his day, Bacon is still known as the first compiler of Maryland statutes.

== Early years ==
The eldest child of mariner William Bacon and his second wife, Elizabeth Richardson, Bacon was probably born a year or so after their 1710 marriage. He had an elder half-brother, William, and a younger brother, Anthony (baptised in 1716). Bacon was either born on the Isle of Man or at his parents' earlier home in Whitehaven, a port town in Cumberland, after which they moved to the island.

He probably received a very good education for his time, because by the mid-1730s, Bacon lived in Dublin and worked in the royal customs service. He had previously managed vessels in the coal trade between Whitehaven and Dublin. In 1737, Bacon published his first book, A Compleat System of the Revenue of Ireland, in its Branches of Import, Export, and Inland Duties, Containing I. An Abridgement of English and Irish Statutes Relating to the Revenue of Ireland II. The Former and Additional Book of Rates Inwards and Outwards, etc. III. A View of the Duties which Compose the Revenue of Ireland, etc. IV. The Method of Making Entries, etc. This earned an invitation for him to become a free citizen of Dublin, with associated privileges.

By 1741, Bacon had married and was publishing the biweekly Dublin Mercury, possibly with the help of his wife or his elder half-brother William, as well as auctioning goods and operating a coffeehouse. In addition to private pamphlets and handbills, Bacon also published the official Irish newspaper, the Dublin Gazette in 1642 and 1643, but abruptly ceased publication in July, after which Augustus Long resumed publication on August 23, 1743. In the interim, a copyright dispute between author Samuel Richardson and other Irish publishers of his controversial novel Pamela, may have caused problems for Bacon, as some characterized him as an agent for the English publisher for selling imported copies after an Irish publisher had printed the first page required under Irish copyright law at the time (which changed as a result of the dispute).

== Ministry ==
Rather than continue his various businesses or pursue a civil service career, Bacon decided to study for the ministry. He returned to the Isle of Man and studied under Thomas Wilson, Bishop of Sodor and Man. At Kirk Michael, Wilson ordained Bacon as a deacon on 23 September 1744, and on 10 March 1745 as a priest "in order to go into the Plantations".

Bacon's brother Anthony had moved to Maryland by 1733, and was working for his uncle, merchant Anthony Richardson until the latter's death in 1741, after which he continued in Maryland for a while, but circa 1749 moved to London to continue his mercantile career, which included the transatlantic slave trade. A 1744 letter mentioned Thomas's prospective missionary career in the colony. The new priest sailed for the colony shortly after his ordination, arriving in Talbot County and assisting the aging priest of St. Peter's parish, Daniel Maynadier, until the latter's death in 1746, when the vestry selected Bacon his successor and he accepted Governor Thomas Bladen's appointment.

Bacon became well known in the local area and in the colonial capital, Annapolis, for his musical abilities (as member of the Music of Annapolis#Tuesday Club in the capital and the Eastern Shore Triumvirate), as well as his learning. His masterwork was a compilation of Maryland's laws, begun circa 1753 and published in three volumes in 1765. Bacon also wrote and published his colony's response to Benjamin Franklin's publication in London concerning a border dispute between the colonies (ultimately resolved by the Mason–Dixon line).

Bacon also became known for his concerns with the education of children in his parish, and especially the religious education of African Americans. Himself a slaveowner, beginning in 1749, Bacon published several sermons lecturing masters about the benefits of extending religion to their slaves, and grave consequences should they fail to fulfill their duties. Like Alexander Garden and George Whitefield, Bacon reassured slaveowners that religious principles upheld their earthly authority over their slaves. Bacon started a school to instruct African Americans, and received books from the Anglican organization of Thomas Bray. Two collections of his sermons were republished in London: Two Sermons Preached to a Congregation of Black Slaves at the Parish of S.P. In the Province of Maryland, By an American Pastor (London, 1749), and Four Sermons upon the Great and Indispensable Duty of All Christian Masters and Mistresses to Bring up Their Negro Slaves in the Knowledge and Fear of God (London, Society for the Propagation of the Gospel 1750).

In 1750, Bacon published a pamphlet and began a subscription to provide a school for free, manual training for children without regard to race, sex, or status. He solicited subscribers from other colonies, giving several concerts in Maryland and Delaware and even traveling to Williamsburg, Virginia the following year to raise funds. The Charity Working School was built in 1755 and operated for a time, including under Rev. Bacon's successor as rector, but Talbot County officials ultimately converted it into a poorhouse.

In 1753, Bacon served as clerk for the gathering of Maryland clergy, and during the following years acted as a moderating influence in several political disputes involving the Rev. Samuel Chase. In 1758, after the French and Indian War, Bacon received the most lucrative and extensive parish in the colony, the newly organized All Saints' Parish in Frederick County, which included most of Western Maryland. However, in that war, Bacon lost his only son, John, who as a lieutenant commanding troops from Annapolis, was killed and scalped near Fort Cumberland. Bacon hired a curate to help him with the large parish, which was split after his death. Three years after his relocation to Frederick, Bacon opened another charity school.

Bacon was elected to the American Philosophical Society in 1768.

== Personal life ==
Bacon was married twice. He sailed from England with his first wife and son John, probably born in the early 1730s. After her death, in the mid-1750s, the widower clergyman was involved in a scandal, with a spinster mulatto woman named Beck, who accused him of being the father of her child. That was not proven, and he filed a lawsuit for defamation, which plodded through the courts. In 1756, Bacon remarried, to Elizabeth Bozman, daughter of Col. Thomas Bozman, a prominent Talbot County resident. However, that too caused scandal, for Bacon had earlier married her to the Rev. John Belchier, and after the couple moved to Philadelphia, Elizabeth learned that her husband was an adventurer and bigamist (having left a wife in England) so she returned home and married the widower Bacon. Bacon was fined for not properly reading the marriage bans beforehand, but could not pay, so that legal action dogged him for years

== Death and legacy ==
Bacon died in Frederick on 24 May 1768, leaving his widow Elizabeth and three daughters (Rachel, Elizabeth, and Mary). His three slaves (a boy, woman and child), were together valued by the probate court at 100 pounds. His daughter Elizabeth moved to England to become a servant to his brother Anthony's wife, and both Rachel and Mary ultimately married and remained in the colony.

Bacon's abridgement of the Laws of Maryland, begun in Talbot county in 1753, became celebrated. The Lord Proprietor, who originally subscribed to 100 pounds, gave the cleric a gold snuff box, which was noted in the inventory of his estate.

His clerical successor, Bennet Allen became the subject of scandal, and locked out of the parish, so he, like Bacon, hired a curate to handle spiritual duties in the huge parish, which was divided after the American Revolutionary War.

In 1813, Virginian William Meade (who would become the Episcopal Bishop of Virginia) published a collection of pro-slavery essays, including some by Bacon. Like Bacon, Meade attempted to justify both the education of African Americans to slaveowners (who preferred illiteracy) as well as slavery (emphasizing the "organic ties" between rich and poor, powerful and powerless who all were to fulfill the responsibilities associated with their particular station in life).

While both St. Peter's parish and All Saints' Church still exist today, Bacon's gravesite was lost as Frederick grew, although it may be under the present city hall and surrounding park, for All Saints' graveyard was moved to the outskirts and consolidated in Mount Olivet cemetery in 1852.
