= Urn of Life =

Sculptures by George Grey Barnard

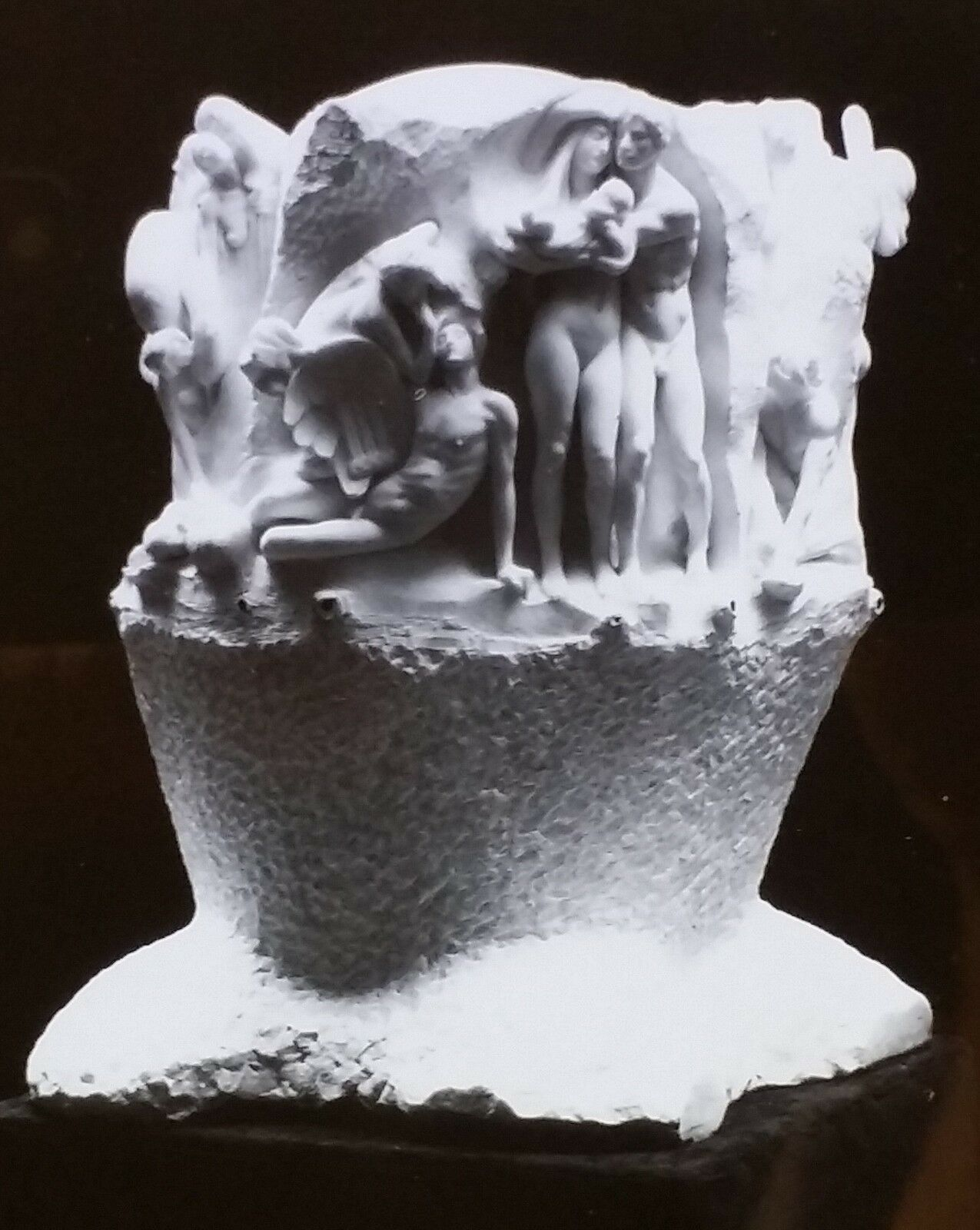
Musician Dying and The Birth

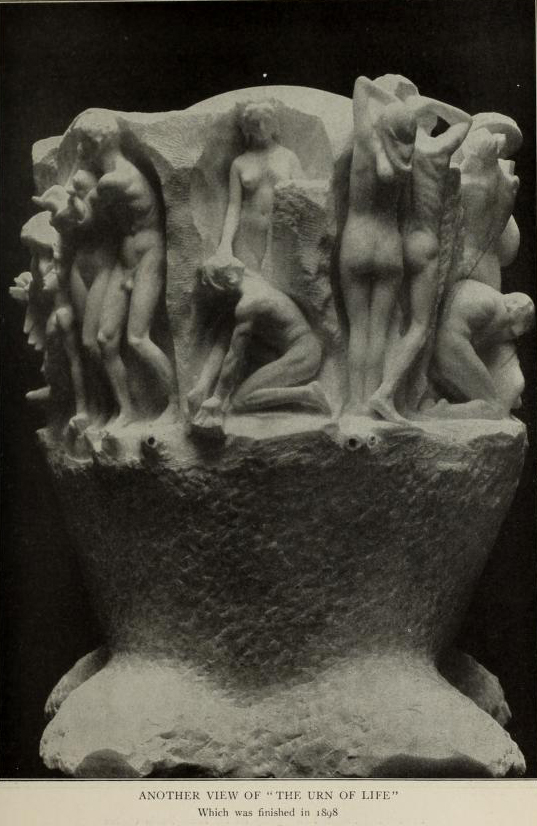
Labor and Love and Solitude

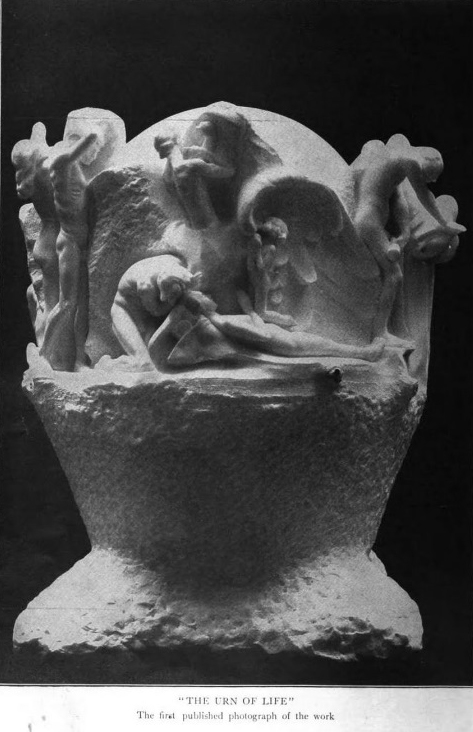
The Visitation

The Urn of Life (modeled 1898-1900, carved 1905-1906) is an allegorical sculpture by George Grey Barnard in the collection of the Carnegie Museum of Art in Pittsburgh, Pennsylvania, United States. Carved from white Carrara marble, it is 37.875 in (96.20 cm) in height, 32.25 in (81.9 cm) in diameter, and weighs approximately 1,650 lb (750 kg).

Following years in storage, the museum thoroughly cleaned the urn and returned it to public exhibition in 2012.

== History ==
Anton Seidl, the 47-year-old Hungarian-born musical director of the New York Philharmonic and conductor of the Metropolitan Opera, died unexpectedly in 1898. A group of Seidl's friends and colleagues commissioned Barnard to create a burial urn to hold Seidl's ashes.

Barnard had made a spectacular debut at the 1894 Paris Salon, and his Struggle of the Two Natures in Man had entered the collection of the Metropolitan Museum of Art in 1896. In 1891, he had modeled a 15 ft (4.6 m) chimneypiece decorated with high bas-relief figure groups illustrating Scandinavian myths. For the new commission, he modeled a series of clay sketches on the themes of life, death and religion, and incorporated these into what became The Urn of Life. Seidl's family initially declined the proposed urn because of its heroic size.

Barnard carved The Urn of Life in marble, 1905–1906. He developed five of its figure groups—The Mystery of Life, The Visitation, The Birth, Solitude, Musician Dying—into independent works.

The Urn of Life, Musician Dying, The Visitation, and The Birth were shown in the 1908 one-man exhibition of Barnard's work, at the Museum of Fine Arts, Boston.

The Mystery of Life, Musician Dying, The Birth, and Solitude were exhibited at the 1913 Armory Show in New York City, along with The Prodigal Son, from Barnard's Pennsylvania State Capitol sculpture groups.

Barnard reworked the urn in 1918, about the time of America's entry into World War I. He sold the unfinished sculpture to the Carnegie Museum of Art in 1919.

Barnard later wrote that his work on The Urn of Life influenced the choices he made for the Pennsylvania State Capitol sculpture groups. (Note: "I found the seed which, when planted, grew into the two compositions known as 'Labor' and 'Love' on either side of the Capitol at Harrisburg.")

== Figure groups ==
Nineteen figures in seven groups encircle The Urn of Life, depicting life events and allegories. Barnard's descriptions of the figure groups come from his papers at the Archives of American Art, Smithsonian Institution:

- The Mystery of Life. The shrouded figure of Mystery holds an egg-shaped urn, while flanked by a man holding a tool and a woman holding flowers. (Note: Barnard: "The starting point is the veiled figure holding a small urn in her hand. This figure represents the Mystery of Life—a veiled mystery. Beneath the urn, held in the hands of Mystery, twines a lily which symbolizes life, and beneath it is a poppy which symbolizes death. The figure of the woman to the right represents Woman as understanding the mystery of life better than the man, and through motherhood in a way that Man cannot. Her attitude, with her fingers to her lips, suggests inquiry with reference to this mystery. In her right hand she holds the flowers that symbolize beauty and eternity—they are falling at the feet of Death. The man to the left, in the midst of his labor, reaches forth in an effort to understand or touch the Mystery of Life.)
- The End of Life. As a grieving couple surveys the recumbent body of an old man, an angel appears. (Note: Barnard: "The Angel of Death closes with his right hand the lips of the aged man, while, as a benediction, he kisses the clasped hands of those who have been faithful unto death.")
- Musician Dying (also called The Dying Poet). A collapsed young man comforted by a female figure. (Note: Barnard: "[T]he group represents the silent, inward voice which inspires us to nobler efforts. The winged harp symbolizes the music of the soul.")
- The Birth (also called Family Group). (Note: Barnard: This "is a group representing the complete family—the father, mother, and child.")
- Labor and Love. A standing woman rests her hand on the head of a kneeling and toiling man. (Note: Barnard:"[T]he group represents a man at labor, and the figure represents the love and sympathy of the wife.)
- Solitude. (Note: Barnard: This "is a group composed of a man and a woman expressing the thought that while they are one in love and spirit, nevertheless they are separate souls.") Depicts the estrangement of Adam and Eve after the Fall of Man—"They are man and woman, together yet alone, divided by that same barrier that even the closest of earthly love is powerless to break down entirely."
- The Visitation. (Note: Barnard: "The group … represents life and the birth of a child. The winged Angel of Life holds in her arms the bambino, or child. The father kneels by the head of the mother expressing his love and sympathy by the touch of a kiss. The figure above the kneeling father represents man carving the wing of the Angel of Life.") A kneeling man kisses the brow of a recumbent woman who has just given birth, while a guardian angel holds their newborn babe. Above them is a sculptor, "hewing out [the angel's] wing from the solid rock,—which is the only way we ever get our wings!"

Marble versions of Solitude are at the Taft Museum of Art in Cincinnati, Ohio; Vassar College in Poughkeepsie, New York; and the Chrysler Museum of Art in Norfolk, Virginia. A marble version of The Mystery of Life is at the Smithsonian American Art Museum in Washington, D.C. Marble versions of The Birth, The Visitation, and Musician Dying were shown in the 1963 centenary exhibition of Barnard's work, but are currently unlocated.

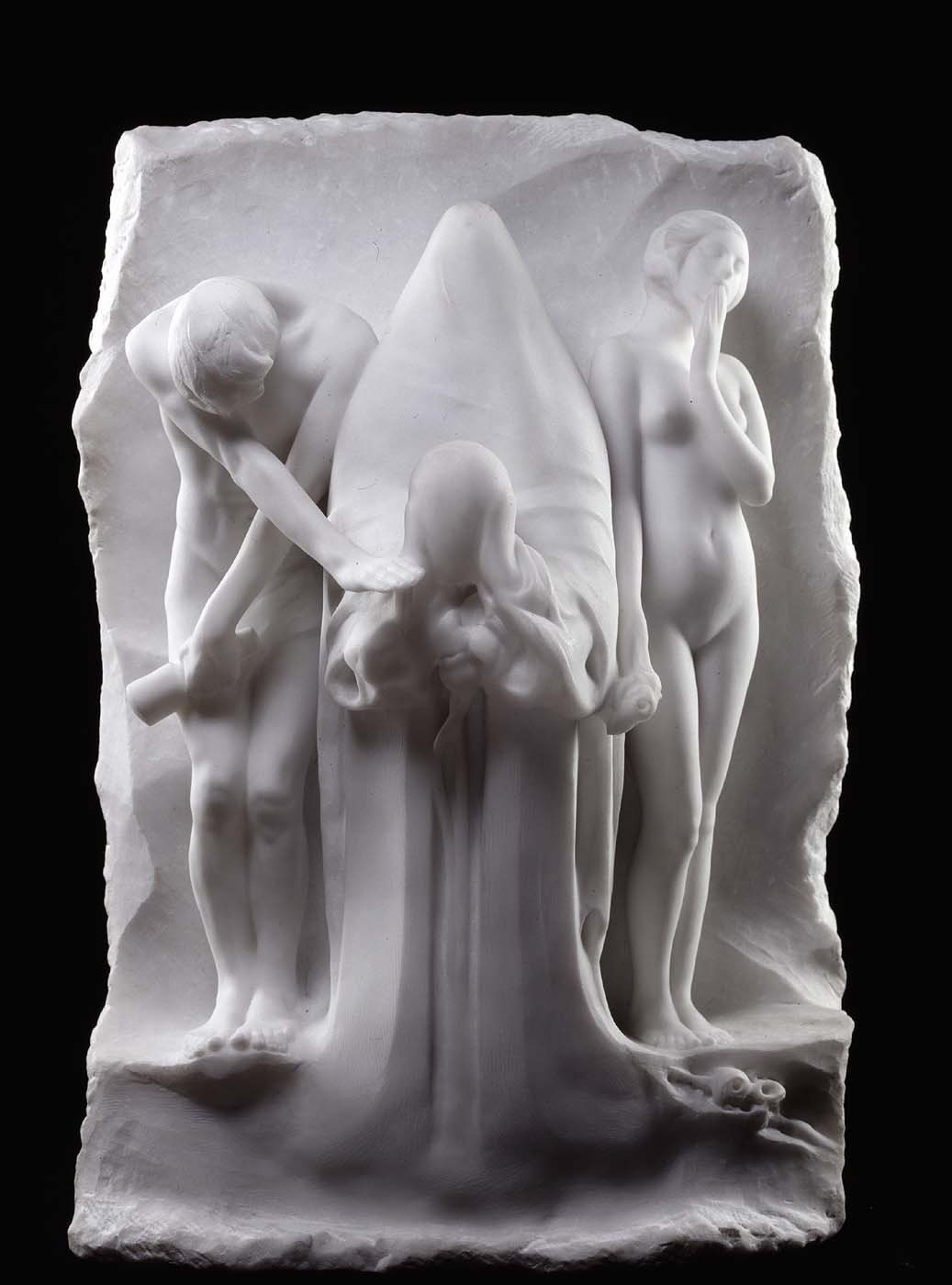
The Mystery of Life (modeled 1898-1900), (Note: "The unfinished urn remained in Barnard's studio, and in 1908 it was included in the exhibition of his work at the Museum of Fine Arts, Boston, where it was mistakenly assigned 1895–97 as its date.") Smithsonian American Art Museum

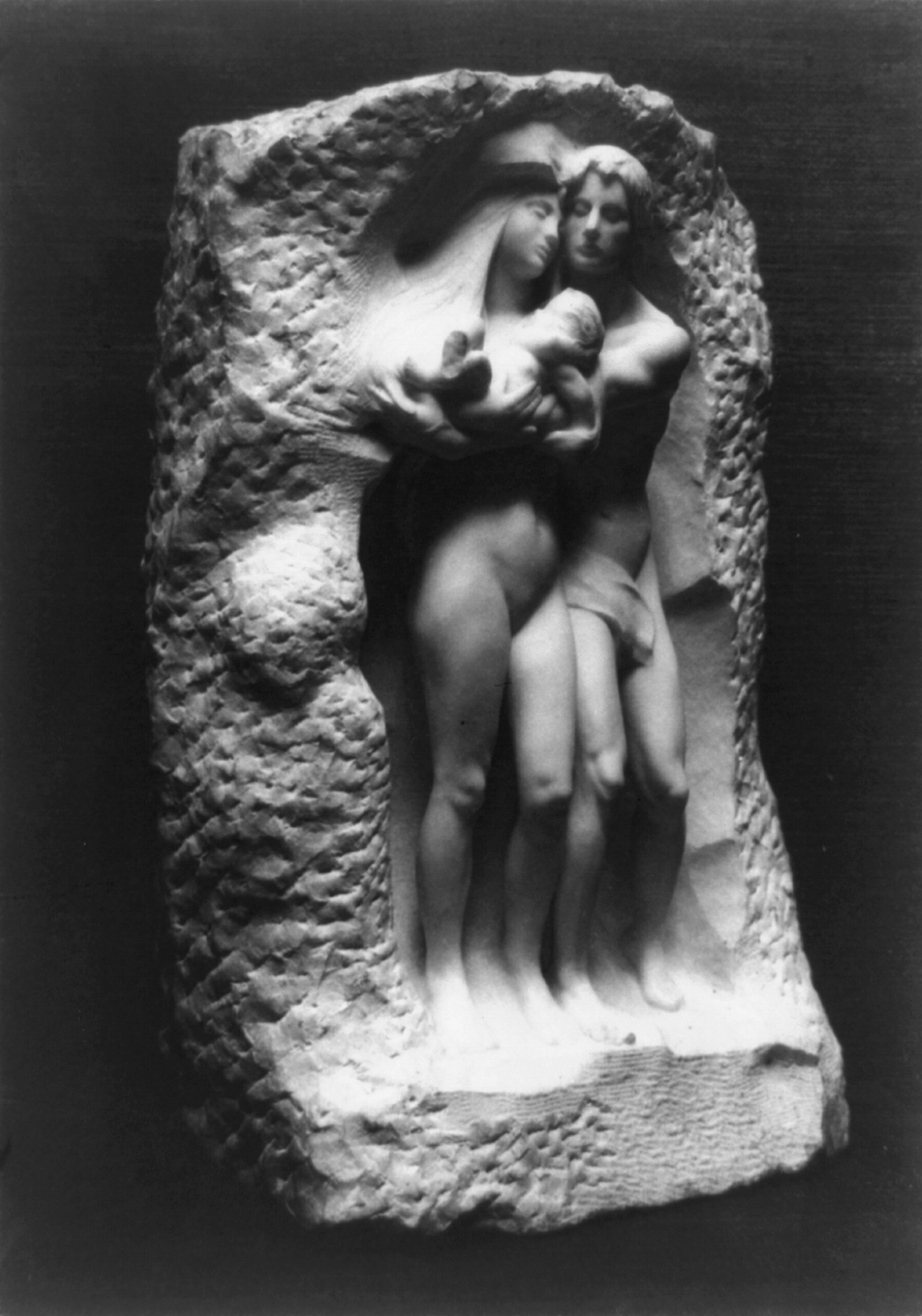
The Birth (modeled 1899-1900), unlocated

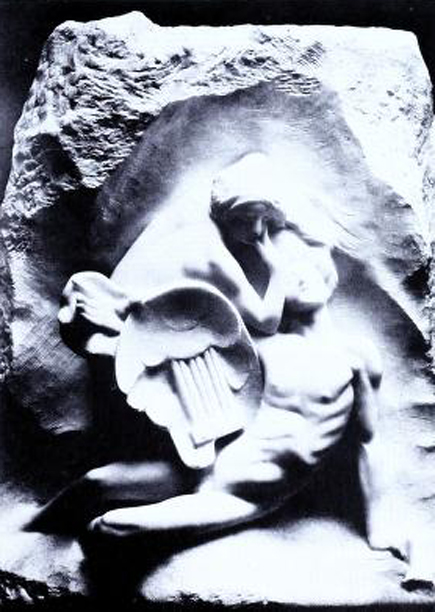
Musician Dying (modeled 1898-1900), unlocated

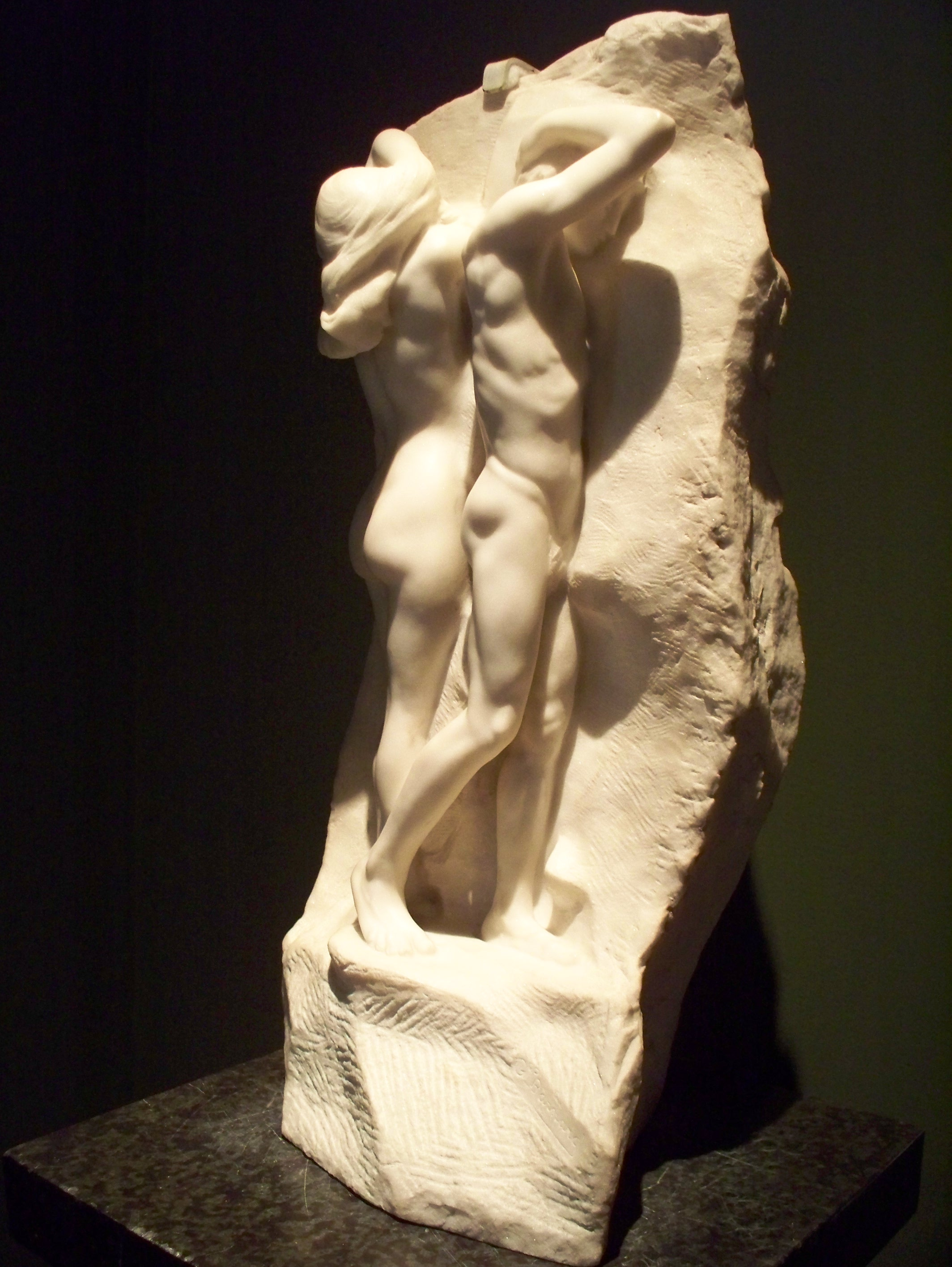
Solitude (Adam and Eve) (carved 1905-1906), Taft Museum of Art

== Burial urn ==
Following the rejection of a heroic size urn, Barnard carved a smaller and simplified version for Seidl's widow:

Urn for Siedl's Ashes: A memorial subscribed for by his friends on view at Steinways.
A memorial urn to contain the ashes of Anton Seidl has been placed, temporarily, in the Steinway
Building in East Fourteenth street, and Thursday [December 27, 1905] there was a private view
of the urn for subscribers.
Former associates and friends of Herr Seidl may see it by applying to Steinway & Sons until
January 6. The urn was designed and carved by George Grey Barnard. It bears sculptured
figures of a dying youth with a harp and of Mystery bearing a small urn of Life.

The egg-shaped burial urn is carved from white marble, and features two figure groups—Musician Dying and The Mystery of Life. It holds the ashes of Anton and Auguste Seidl, and is housed in the Fresh Pond Crematory and Columbarium in Queens, New York City.
