= The Prodigal Son (Barnard) =

Public sculpture by George Grey Barnard

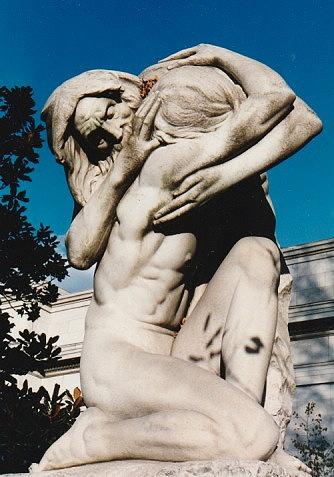
- Outside the Speed Art Museum, Louisville, Kentucky
- Artist: George Grey Barnard
- Year: modeled 1904 carved 1906, 1909
- Type: Carrara marble
- Location: Harrisburg, Pennsylvania; Louisville, Kentucky (replica); Pittsburgh, Pennsylvania (reduced size replica)

The Prodigal Son (modeled 1904) is a sculpture group by George Grey Barnard that depicts the loving reunion of the father and son from the New Testament "Parable of the Prodigal Son."

Three examples exist in marble:

- Original: Pennsylvania State Capitol, Harrisburg, Pennsylvania, marble, 81.25 in (206.4 cm) x 54 in (140 cm) x 60.5 in (154 cm), carved by Florio Piccirilli in New York City, 1909. One of Barnard's sixteen twice-life-size figures in the sculpture groups that flank the Capitol's main entrance.
- Replica: Speed Art Museum, Louisville, Kentucky, marble, 81.25 in (206.4 cm) x 54 in (140 cm) x 60.5 in (154 cm), carved by Furio Piccirilli in New York City, 1909. Exhibited outside the museum.
- Reduced-size replica: Carnegie Museum of Art, Pittsburgh, Pennsylvania, marble, 37 in (94 cm) x 24.5 in (62 cm) x 18 in (46 cm), carved by Barnard outside Paris, 1906. Exhibited inside the museum.

A plaster example of The Prodigal Son was shown in the 1963 centenary exhibition of Barnard's work, but is currently unlocated.

== History ==
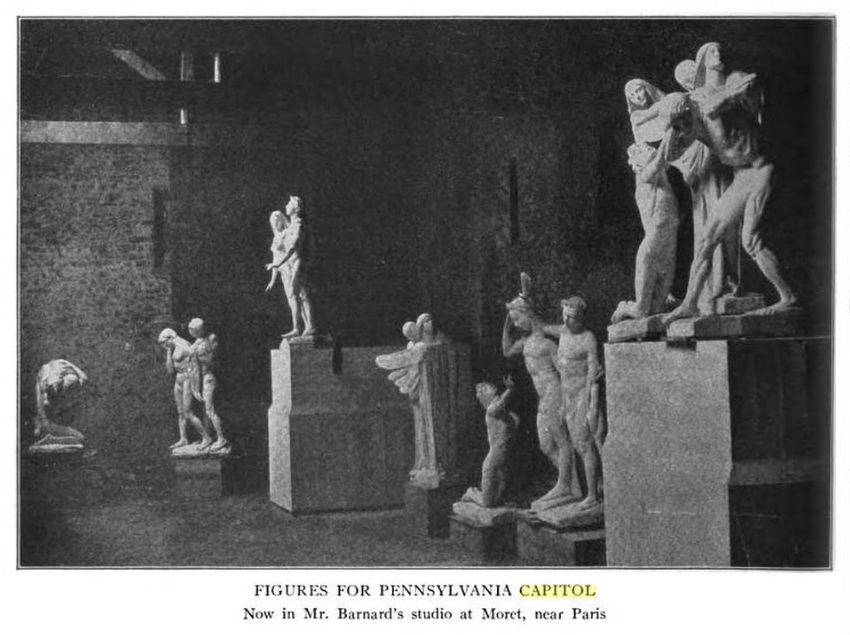
The Prodigal Son (far left) in Barnard's studio outside Paris, c. 1908

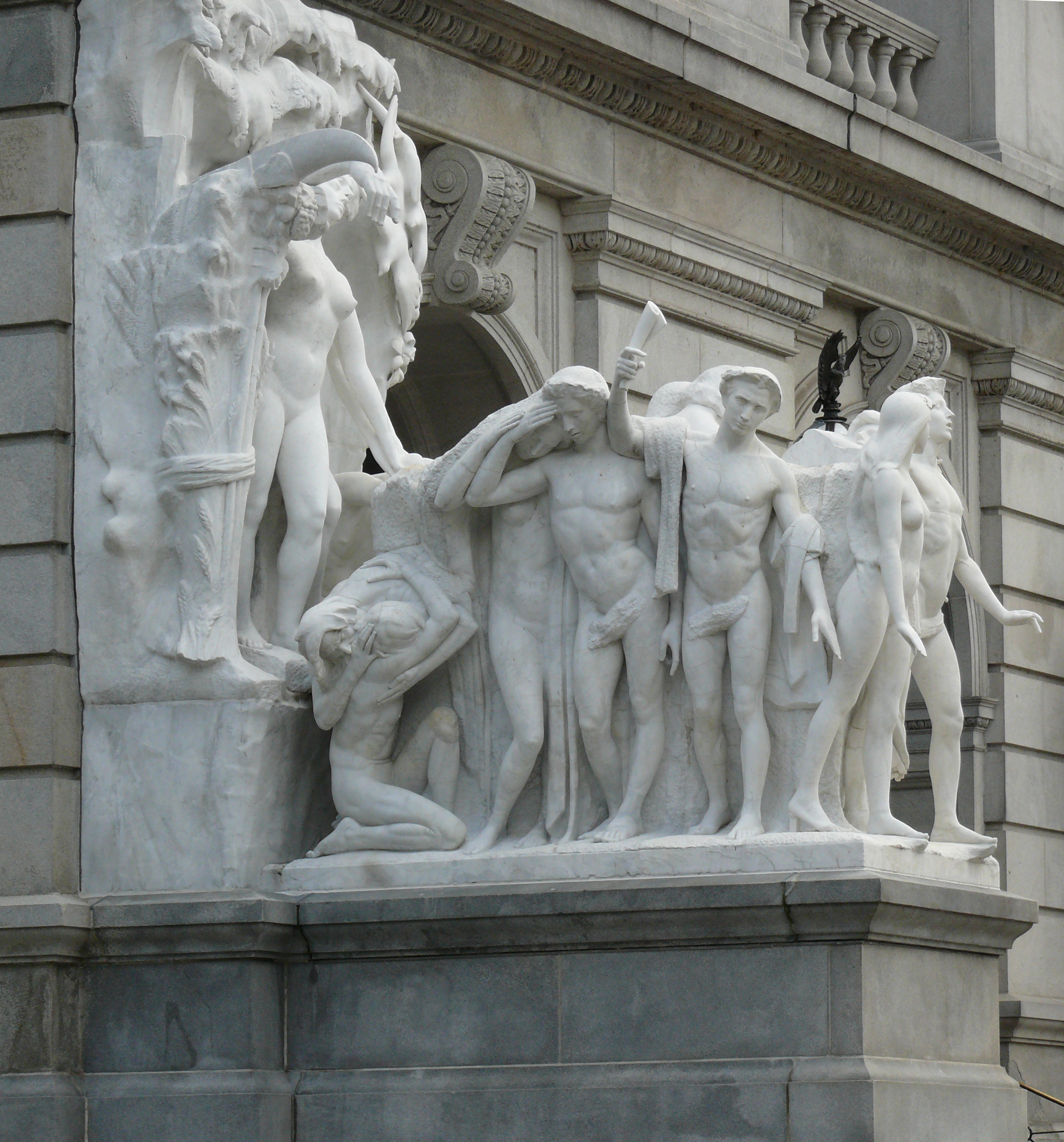
Love and Labor: The Unbroken Law (installed 1911)

Barnard was awarded the most important commission of his career in 1902, the sculpture groups for the Pennsylvania State Capitol. He left his teaching position at the Art Students League of New York in spring 1903, and moved to Paris. Barnard and his assistants toiled for nearly eight years on the twenty-seven figures in the sculpture groups. One of the first sculptures completed was The Prodigal Son—in 1904, while his assistants were modeling the twice-life-size version of it in clay, Barnard was pointing and carving the reduced-size version in marble.

The completed groups in plaster were shipped to New York City in 1909, to be carved in marble by Furio Piccirilli. The marble groups were completed in early 1910, and shipped back to France to make their debut at the Salon des Artistes Francais, at the end of April. Gustav Stickley's magazine The Craftsman printed nearly two pages of rave reviews, translated from French, that Barnard received for the Pennsylvania State Capitol sculpture groups.

=== Pennsylvania State Capitol ===
The Prodigal Son and the other fifteen marble sculpture groups were shipped back to the United States, and installed by the Piccirilli Brothers on either side of the main entrance to the Pennsylvania State Capitol, April–May 1911. Some Pennsylvania legislators and local religious leaders objected to the nudity of Barnard's sculptures. He responded:

There has been some criticism, because these 30 figures I have executed are nude. Only in the nude could I have given adequate expression to these figures. Drapery would have spoiled the effect. Only through delineation of the nude human form can great emotions be shown. You cannot drape a symbolic figure in an overcoat and expect it to be anything but a marble dummy.
It is curious that this criticism should come from men, while women approve of the work as is. Women have better artistic sense than men. They are inspired by the human form, but men are not similarly inspired. They think the nude suggestive. I understand that the Pennsylvania state authorities are going to drape them. I shall make no protest, but I am sorry.

Initially, plaster of Paris short trousers were applied to the male figures, but the results proved unsatisfactory. Two tents were erected on Friday, May 12, one around each sculpture group, to mask that day's removal of the plaster trousers. On Sunday, the canvas walls of the tents were cut down by art-lovers who wished to view the sculptures before plaster loincloths were applied on Monday—"the great majority of the crowd being women", according to The Chicago Tribune. Instead of short trousers or loincloths, the Piccirilli Brothers carved marble sheaths to cover the genitals of the male figures, for which they charged $118.50.

=== Speed Art Museum ===
The other twice-life-size Prodigal Son was also carved in marble by Florio Piccirilli, and is dated 1909. This remained in Barnard's possession for a decade, until he sold it in 1919. It was donated to the J. B. Speed Art Museum in 1939.

=== Carnegie Museum of Art ===
The Carnegie Museum of Art's Prodigal Son was carved in France by Barnard, and is marked "Moret-sur-Loing / 1906." He later wrote that it was "one of my most carefully finished marbles", and that "the delicate surfaces proper to a small figure ... are not necessary to the larger works."

Diana Strazdes, primary author of the museum's 1992 catalogue of paintings and sculpture, contrasted Auguste Rodin's Prodigal Son with Barnard's:

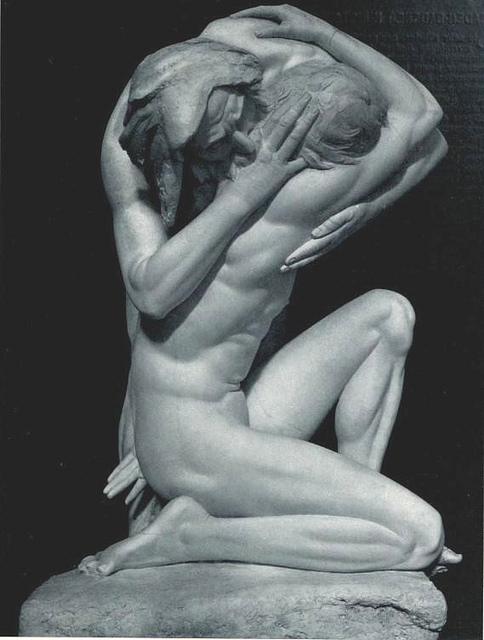
Photograph from Barnard's 1908 one-man exhibition, Museum of Fine Arts, Boston

While Rodin chose to show the son alone, overcome with despair and yearning for forgiveness, Barnard selected the moment of reconciliation from the biblical story and replaced Rodin's darker, more psychologically complex tone with a mood of hope and promise. Here, the father bends protectively over the son. The embrace of their arms makes a complete circle; the two bodies intertwine as one, successfully symbolizing the idea of forgiveness and humility in the face of love.

== Exhibition history ==
A plaster of The Prodigal Son was shown in Barnard's one-man exhibition at the Museum of Fine Arts, Boston, November–December 1908.

The twice-life-size marble (for the Pennsylvania State Capitol) was exhibited at the Salon des Artistes Francais, Paris, April–May 1910.

Barnard exhibited his twice-life-size marble (now at the Speed Art Museum) at the 1913 Armory Show in New York City, along with four sculpture groups from his Urn of Life.

A marble of The Prodigal Son was installed in the garden of the Hispanic Society of America, June–August 1923, as part of an outdoor exhibition organized by the National Sculpture Society.

The Carnegie Museum of Art's marble was loaned to a 1963 traveling exhibition: Fiftieth Anniversary Exhibition of the Armory Show of 1913, organized by the Munson-Williams-Proctor Arts Institute.

A plaster of The Prodigal Son was included in the 1963 centenary exhibition of Barnard's work at Pennsylvania State University. It is currently unlocated.
