= The Great God Pan (sculpture) =

Sculpture by George Grey Barnard in Manhattan, New York, U.S.

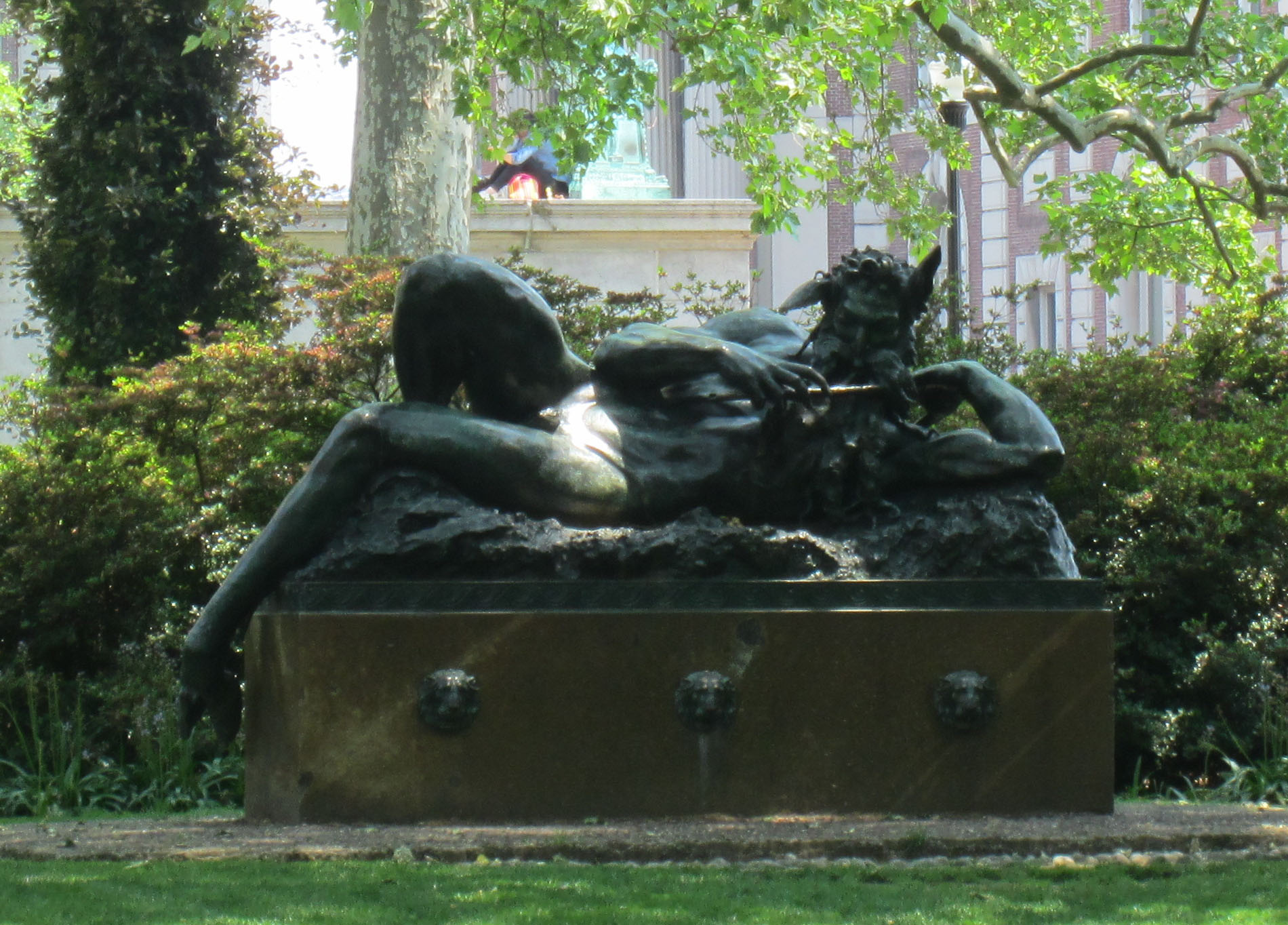
- The sculpture at Columbia University in 2014
- Artist: George Grey Barnard
- Year: 1898–1899
- Medium: Bronze sculpture
- Subject: Pan
- Dimensions: 120 cm × 110 cm × 248 cm (49 in × 43 in × 97.5 in)
- Location: Columbia University, north of College Walk (W. 116th Street), Manhattan, New York City, New York, United States
- 40°48′29.6″N 73°57′45.2″W
- Owner: Columbia University

The Great God Pan (cast 1898–1899) is a bronze sculpture by American sculptor George Grey Barnard. Since 1907, it has been a fixture of the Columbia University campus in Manhattan, New York City.

== Description ==
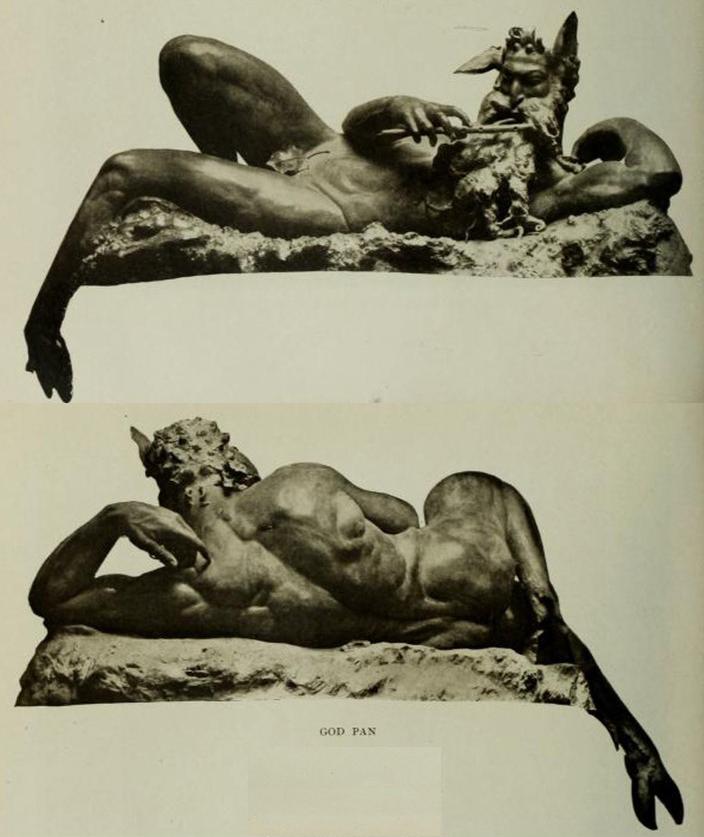
The Great God Pan, front and back, in 1902

The sculpture depicts the Greek god Pan, a half-man, half-goat deity associated with pastoral living, rustic music, and carnality. Barnard's Pan is mature and strongly muscled, with a long tangled beard, the ears and cloven hooves of a goat, but no horns or tail. He reclines lazily on his side atop a rock, playing his reed pipe and dangling one hoof over the edge of the rock.

The bronze sculpture is approximately 49 inches (120 cm) tall, 97.5 inches (248 cm) long, and 43 inches (110 cm) wide. It weighs 4,300 pounds (2,000 kg). Its green granite base is 27.5 inches (70 cm) high, 111.5 inches (283 cm) long, and 45 inches (110 cm) wide.

The inscription on the back reads: "George Grey Barnard – Sculptor". The inscription on the right front corner reads: "Geo. Gray Barnard / Sc. 1899. Cast in one piece by / Henry-Bonnard Bronze Company / Founders New York 1899," and is accompanied by the founder's mark.

== History ==
Barnard conceived the sculpture in 1894. Originally it was intended to be a fountain sculpture for the courtyard of The Dakota, a luxury apartment building on Manhattan's Upper West Side. (Note: "I have been busy this last week on a study for the old God Pan, down by the river playing his reed — I am in hopes of selling this one to young Edward Severin Clark for the entrance to The Dakota." — George Grey Barnard, Paris, to his parents, January 14, 1894.) Alfred Corning Clark, an heir to the Singer Sewing Machine fortune, was Barnard's most important early patron. Clark's father had built The Dakota, and bequeathed the building to Clark's teenage son Edward in 1882. Clark visited Paris in 1895 and commissioned Barnard to proceed with the larger-than-life-size sculpture, but it was never installed at The Dakota.

Alfred Corning Clark died unexpectedly at age 51 in April 1896. His family privately offered Pan to the city in November 1896, to be the centerpiece of a fountain in Central Park:

The "Pan," which was sketched in Paris, but executed in this country, the plaster cast forming part of the exhibit at Logerot Gardens, was ordered by Mr. Clark for the court of the Dakota flats; but convinced that this superb work of art should belong to the public, he directed his heirs to present it to the city, on the condition that it be placed in Central Park, the Clark estate paying all expenses of casting and erection.

The city's Art Commission approved acceptance of the gift, but the city's Parks Commission spent six months debating the suitability of the work and considering various Central Park locations before declining the Clark family's offer. The New York Evening Telegram published a June 10, 1897, cartoon entitled "The Two Orphans", which lampooned Barnard's Pan and Frederick William MacMonnies's Bacchante and Infant Faun, the latter having been rejected for the Boston Public Library the year before.

Edward Severin Clark, continuing his late father's support for Barnard's work, funded the casting of Pan in bronze and loaned the bronze cast to the Metropolitan Museum of Art and international expositions.

=== Bronze casting ===
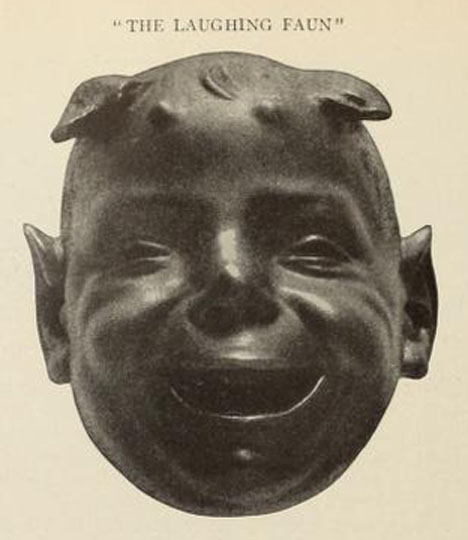
Laughing Faun, 1896

Barnard wanted his plaster sculpture cast in bronze in a single piece—as opposed to assembled from separately-cast pieces—but could not find a French foundry willing to attempt it. French-born Eugene F. Aucaigne, manager of the Henry-Bonnard Bronze Company of Mount Vernon, New York, took on the challenge. Following months of preparation and construction of an extremely complex and heavy mold, Aucaigne oversaw the successful casting of Pan in bronze in August 1898. At that time, it was the largest bronze sculpture cast in a single piece in the United States.

Barnard's plaster model for the sculpture's base featured a rock surrounded by reeds and cattails, with a standing crane to visually balance Pan's head. He also modeled Laughing Faun, a small mask to cover the water spouts around the sculpture's base. (Note: At Barnard's 1908 one-man show in Boston, he exhibited "Small Mask of Faun (for the basin of God Pan). Modeled 1896.") The idea of Pan as a fountain sculpture was abandoned following the Parks Commission's rejection; Barnard's base was never cast in bronze, and the faun masks were not used.

Barnard tried to manipulate the Parks Commission into reconsidering its rejection of Pan, presenting the sculpture's placement in Central Park as a fait accompli in a national magazine. (Note: "'Pan comes out of his shell to-day,' wrote Mr. Barnard, the sculptor, to a friend upon the successful casting of the statue in September. The preparation for the work of casting employed the Henry Bonnard Bronze Company eight months. The statue is of colossal size and bears the distinction of being the first bronze ever cast entire. It was first intended for a fountain figure, and Mr. Barnard modelled an imitable baby face, representing a youthful faun which was to be used in duplication as gargoyles around the base. The statue of Pan is now undergoing the final burnishing, and within the next few weeks will be placed in position and unveiled in the Central Park of this city, probably between Seventy-second and Eighty-first streets, on the west side.") When the commission balked at this, a boulder fronting on Central Park Lake was proposed as an alternative site. (Note: "It is not an island, but a small peninsula, jutting out into the lake in Central Park, that seems destined as the latter-day haunt of Pan. Not ancient Salamis or its blue inlets does the proposed site suggest, but perhaps it is as bucolic a spot, in its way, as could be found. A little brook runs parallel with an arm of the lake, dallying along a slender stretch of land before it loses itself in the larger body of water. This forms the peninsula, and here, on a natural boulder, the great bronze statue of Pan, by George Grey Barnard, is to rest; that is, if the present Park Commissioners favor the wishes of those most interested.") The commission dithered for four more years, (Note: "The 'Pan' was given to Central Park, as a fountain, in 1897. Politics, indecision as to location, and other hindrances and postposements have kept the bronze in retirement, so that New Yorkers who wished to see their own possessions have been able to do so only by visiting the Buffalo exhibition where 'Pan' was exhibited.") before again rejecting Pan for Central Park. (Note: "The trajectory of refusal that most closely paralleled the Bacchante's was Barnard's languid reclining Great God Pan. Presented to the City of New York in November 1896, it was rejected by the Parks Commission for placement in Central Park in June 1897, coincidentally just days after McKim donated the Bacchante to The Met. Following a controversy that played out similarly to what had transpired in Boston, the decision was reversed. Alone and together, Bacchante and Pan were lampooned in cartoons and verse in which the figures variously appeared unclothed or clothed. Their respective attributes, grapes and musical pipes, were substituted for other symbols, in the Bacchante's case, pots of Boston baked beans, salted cod, liquor bottles, and volumes of poetry. The bronze cast of Pan was briefly on view at The Met beginning in spring 1899, located near the Bacchante, and it was later exhibited widely, but never in Central Park. Instead Pan's owners, Elizabeth Scriven Clark and her son Edward Severin Clark, gave it to Columbia University in 1907. Installed on campus through McKim's auspices, today it faces Lewisohn Hall.")

=== Exhibitions ===
Barnard included the plaster cast of Pan in his first one-man exhibition, held in November 1898 under the glass roof of the Logerot Hotel winter garden, (Note: "One striking feature of the Logerot is the large garden of iron and glass in the rear of the hotel on Eighteenth Street. The glass roof is so arranged as to slide and fold up, thus transforming an immense hall into an open garden of exceeding beauty. Tall palms, banks of foliage and flowers, arranged with skill and care, give the place an appearance of tropical luxuriance. The playing fountain sends forth jeweled sprays, which break into the colors of the rainbow under the glare of electric lights. Of an evening when a party or ball is in progress the garden is a sight worth seeing. It is used also for garden parties, promenade concerts and flower exhibitions.) at Fifth Avenue and 18th Street in New York City.

The bronze Pan was loaned for a year to the Metropolitan Museum of Art, beginning in spring 1899.

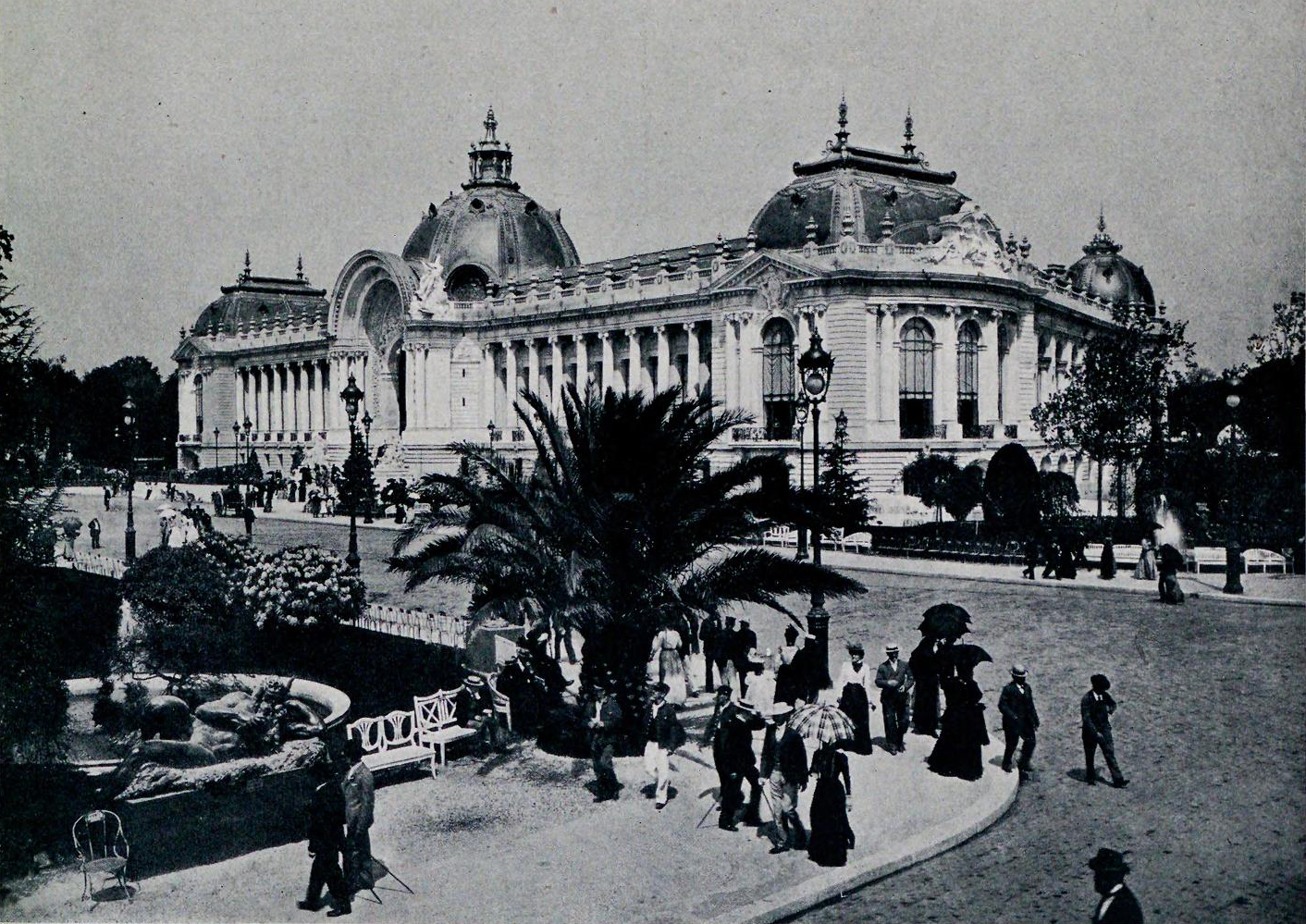
The Great God Pan at the Exposition Universelle (1900), Paris (bottom left)

Barnard exhibited Pan and Struggle of the Two Natures in Man at the Exposition Universelle in Paris from April to November 1900. (Note: "The heroic group by George Gray Barnard, entitled 'The Two Natures,' is a strong piece of poetic symbolism that commands thoughtful attention. He also exhibited the large bronze 'God Pan,' which is characteristically full of force.") The bronze Pan was installed outdoors along the Champs-Élysées, and the marble Two Natures inside the Petit Palais des Beaux-Arts. He was awarded a Gold Medal for the two sculptures.

Barnard exhibited Pan and Two Natures at the Pan-American Exposition in Buffalo, New York, from May to November 1901. The bronze Pan was installed in front of the art gallery and the marble Two Natures within the gallery. (Note: "[H]is bronze god Pan, formally presented to the city of New York in 1897 [sic] by Mr. Clark's estate, has not yet been placed [in Central Park], although its conspicuous site before the Pan-American Exposition art gallery at Buffalo made it familiar to many.") He was awarded a Gold Medal for the two sculptures.

In November 1902, the bronze Pan was among the four works shown by Barnard at the National Sculpture Society exhibition at Madison Square Garden, New York City. (Note: "Barnard [was represented] by two pieces of heroic size—the bronze 'God Pan' and the marble 'Hewer,' and two life size marbles, 'Boy,' and 'Female Figure.'")

The bronze Pan was exhibited at the 1904 World's Fair in St. Louis, Missouri, as part of an industrial display inside the Palace of Manufactures. (Note: "In the Henry-Bonnard Bronze Co.'s attractive display are to be seen George Gray Barnard's "God Pan," originally made for Central Park, that received the gold medal at the Paris Exposition. It was cast in one piece and is a remarkable production.") The Henry-Bonnard Bronze Company was awarded a Gold Medal for its accomplishment in casting the sculpture, but Barnard was not recognized for Pan's artistic merit.

The plaster cast of Pan was included in the Museum of Fine Arts, Boston's one-man exhibition of Barnard's work, November–December 1908.

=== Columbia University ===
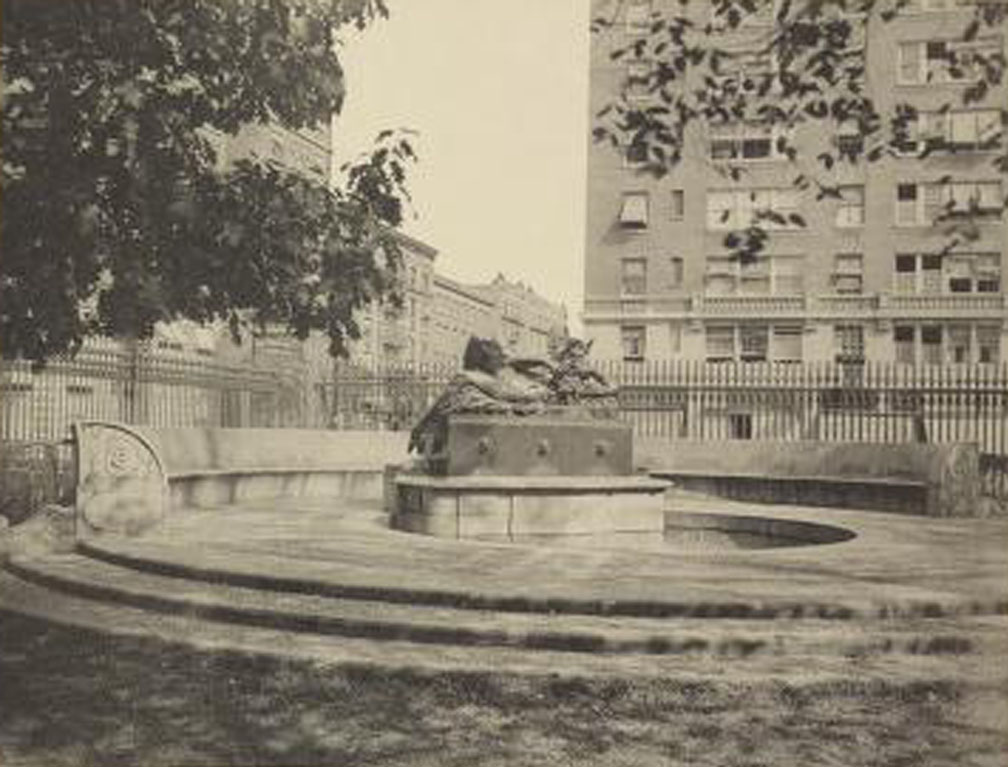
Fountain of the Great God Pan, Columbia College, c.1918

Following the second rejection of Pan for Central Park, Edward Clark and his mother donated the bronze sculpture to Columbia College (now Columbia University). The sculpture was placed upon a green-granite Neoclassical base with three bronze lion-head water spouts for use as a fountain. Charles Follen McKim, of McKim, Meade & White, designed the architectural setting for Pan: a D-shaped granite fountain basin, circular pool, stepped platform, and exedra (curved stone bench). The stone used for the fountain was Pompton pink granite, quarried in Pompton Lakes and Riverdale, New Jersey. The Pan Fountain was installed in 1907 on The Green at Amsterdam Avenue and 120th Street, then the northeast corner of the campus.

The sculpture inspired a poem by Ralph Perry, editor of the 1916 yearbook, The Columbian:

To the Great God Pan

We haven't got a bull dog nor an ideal for a totem.
But yet we have a watchword and an emblem of our clan:
We don't say much about it, for it passes our expression
For the symbol of our spirit is the Great God Pan.

Yes, the big and mystic statue that has crept into our blood
With the love we bear our college—and who knows when that began?
But we feel it, and we sense it with a fervor more than knowledge
When we swear, so very softly, "By the Great God Pan!"

All the bigness that is in us, all the glory that runs through us.
That is called out by "Columbia!" as we travel in her van—
And the spirit which it voices is of youth and aspiration:
Aye, may we live forever by the Great God Pan!

In 1959, to make way for construction of the Seeley W. Mudd Engineering Building, Columbia relocated the Pan statue and its granite base—but not its architectural setting and fountain—to Amsterdam Avenue and 119th Street. It was relocated again in 1963, to a courtyard between Fayerweather and Avery Halls. To make way for a 1975 expansion of Avery Hall, Pan was relocated to its current site: north of West 116th Street, between Lewisohn Hall and the Low Memorial Library.

== Critical reception ==
In 1903, Lorado Taft wrote:

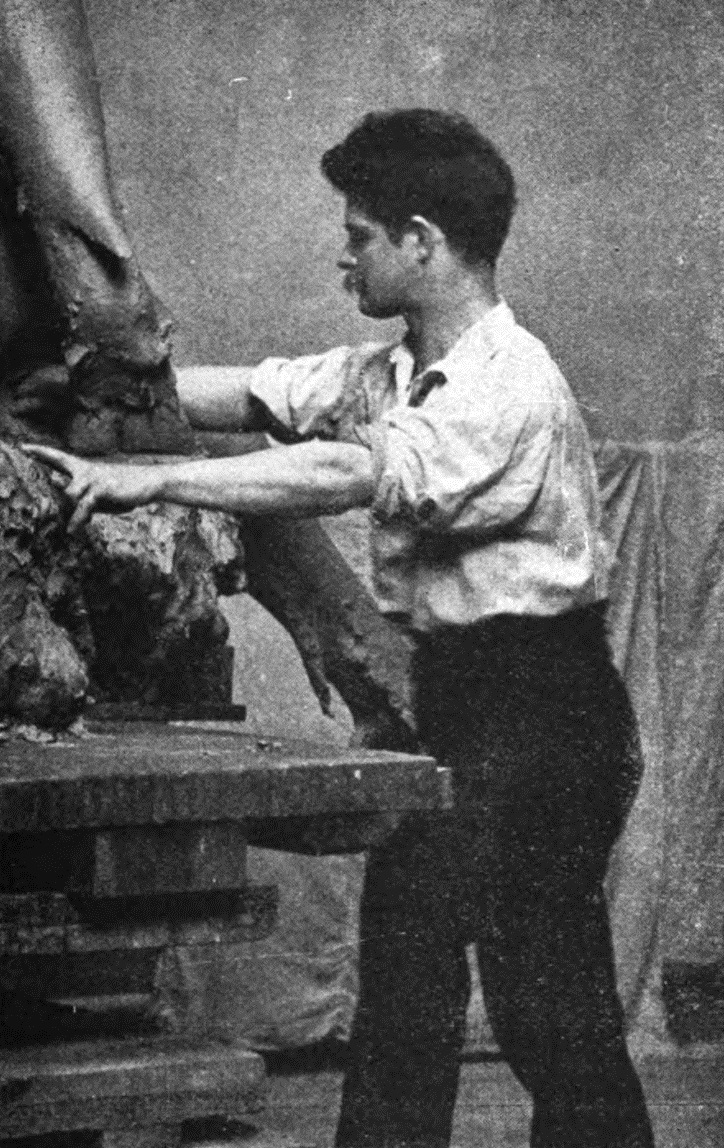
Barnard posing with the bronze cast, 1898

Having come home [following 12 years in Paris] with the avowed object of assisting in the development of a "national art," Mr. Barnard must have been rather bewildered to find himself promptly engaged upon a large statue of the "Great God Pan," intended to surmount a rustic fountain within the court of an apartment building. It never reached its destination, but was called higher, to the adornment of Central Park. In common with each of Mr. Barnard's works in turn, it has been pronounced "one of the strangest and most original things yet done by an American sculptor." Its whimsical novelty is as marked as the skill of its execution,—an execution no less cleverly adapted to bronze than most of Mr. Barnard's sculpture to stone. One wonders how he ever happened to make this monstrous creature. What inspiration could the sculptor of the "Two Natures" find in such a subject? Probably some moss-stained figure of classic Italy gave him the idea, and he overlooked its anachronism in his love of muscular modelling, and of nature in general, which Pan may still be permitted to typify. The subject is not very interesting, however; the head is too powerfully grotesque, and the misshapen legs are unpleasant. The transition of the latter from the human to the brutish form should have been made more plausible. Frémiet, with far less felicity of surface handling, could have made those legs convincing. The venerable master would have made us feel sure that if ever there had been such monstrosities, they must have been just as he saw fit to fashion them.

In 1908, J. Nilsen Laurvik wrote:

In the sculpture of Barnard, as in the work of Rodin, we see the vital, almost consuming energy that appears to bestir itself within the clay or marble as it flows out in the undulating, rhythmic movements of thews [sinews] and muscles, in the suggestions of the delicate yet withal powerful bony structure of the body under its finely drawn covering of soft flesh and smooth envelope of skin, as in the prostrate figure of the Two Natures, where the shoulder blades and the delicate ridge and furrow of the backbone are modeled with a supple, caressing, quivering touch as of life itself. This is no less true of his well-known bronze figure Pan, which adorns the northeastern corner of Columbia University campus. With the discerning, this lazy creature of infinite good nature has already become a sort of a classic in the art of our country—one of the very few so far, and one destined to remain incomparable for some time to come. In its suavity and suppleness of modeling it reveals Barnard's virtuosity in a striking manner. It has all the freedom and spontaneity of what we are pleased to term a "sketch" with the dignity and impressiveness of what we so often mistake for a "finished" composition. The modeling of the mobile features of the old god's luxuriant face, executed in eight final sweeps of the sculptor's two thumbs, is in itself a tour de force indicative of the man's perfect mastery of his medium. To say that he thinks and feels in clay would hardly be an exaggeration.

== See also ==
- Greek mythology in western art and literature
