= Statue of Abraham Lincoln (Cincinnati) =

Public sculpture by George Grey Barnard

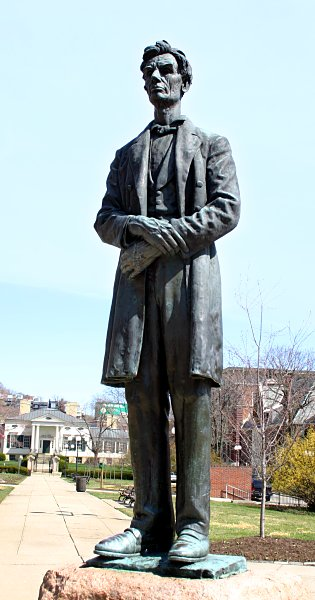
- Statue of Lincoln at Lytle Park. The Taft Museum of Art stands in the background.

- Artist: George Grey Barnard
- Year: 1917
- Medium: Bronze
- Subject: Abraham Lincoln
- Dimensions: 3.4 m (11 ft)
- Location: Lytle Park, Cincinnati
- 39°06′04″N 84°30′15″W

An 11-foot (3.4 m) bronze statue of Abraham Lincoln is installed in Lytle Park within downtown Cincinnati, Ohio. The Charles P. Taft family commissioned artist George Grey Barnard to complete a statue in commemoration of the centenary of Lincoln's birth. The sculpture was unveiled at Lytle Park on March 31, 1917. Former U.S. President William Howard Taft, the younger brother of Charles, delivered the dedication speech.

Castings of Barnard's statue also exist in Louisville, Kentucky and Manchester, England.

== See also ==
- List of statues of Abraham Lincoln
- Piatt Park, downtown park with bronze statues of William Henry Harrison and James Garfield
- List of sculptures of presidents of the United States
