= Struggle of the Two Natures in Man =

Sculpture by George Grey Barnard

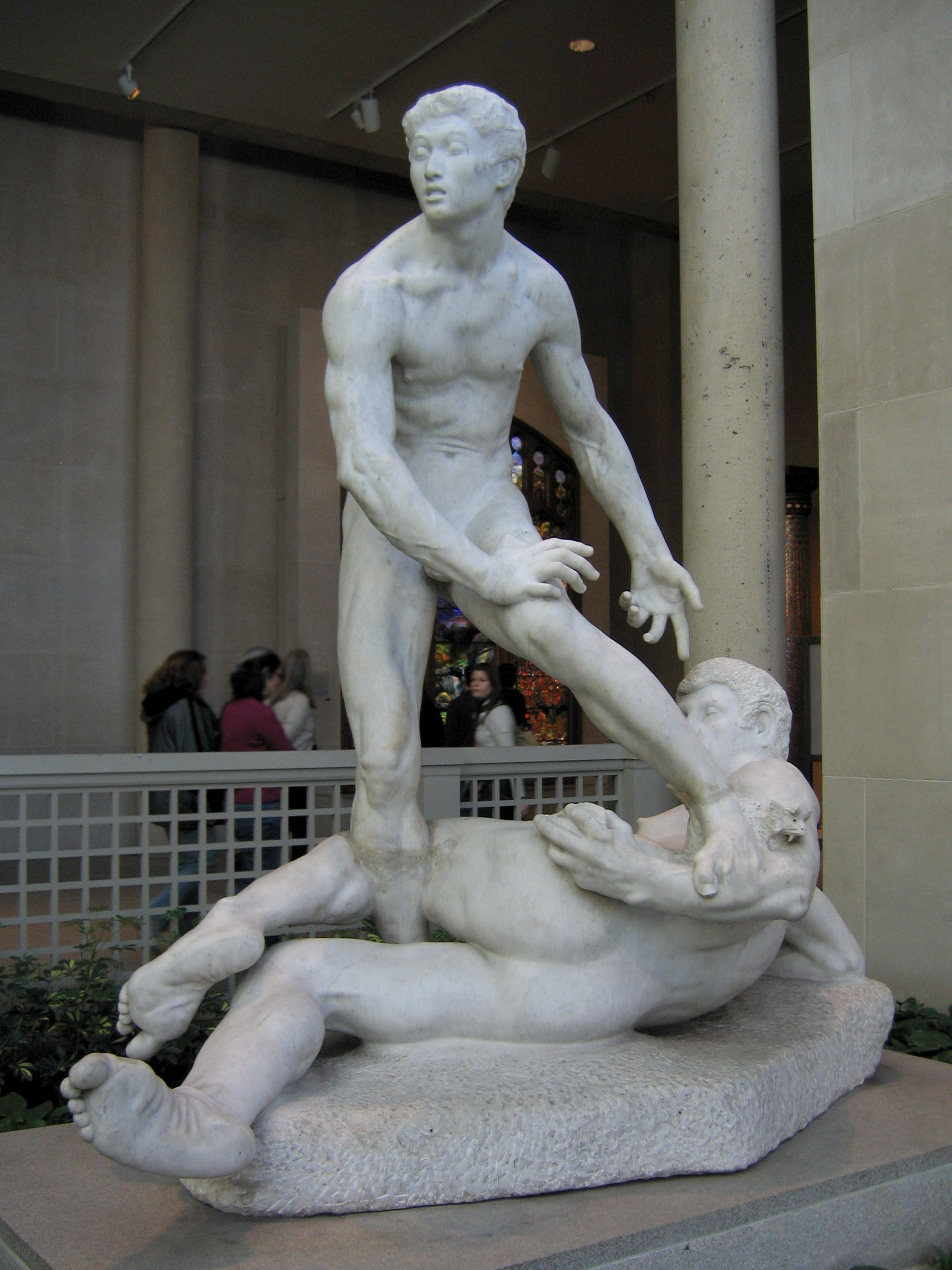
- The sculpture at the Metropolitan Museum of Art in 2006
- Artist: George Grey Barnard
- Year: 1888
- Type: Sculpture
- Medium: Marble
- Dimensions: 260 cm × 260 cm × 120 cm (100 in × 100 in × 47 in)
- Location: Metropolitan Museum of Art; New York

Struggle of the Two Natures in Man is an 1888 marble sculpture by American artist George Grey Barnard. It was carved during 1892–1894 and measures 101 inches (260 cm) x 102 inches (260 cm) x 48 inches (120 cm). The sculpture is part of the collection of the Metropolitan Museum of Art, in New York.
