= The Inn at Cooperstown =

Historic house in New York, United States

- U.S. Historic district – Contributing property
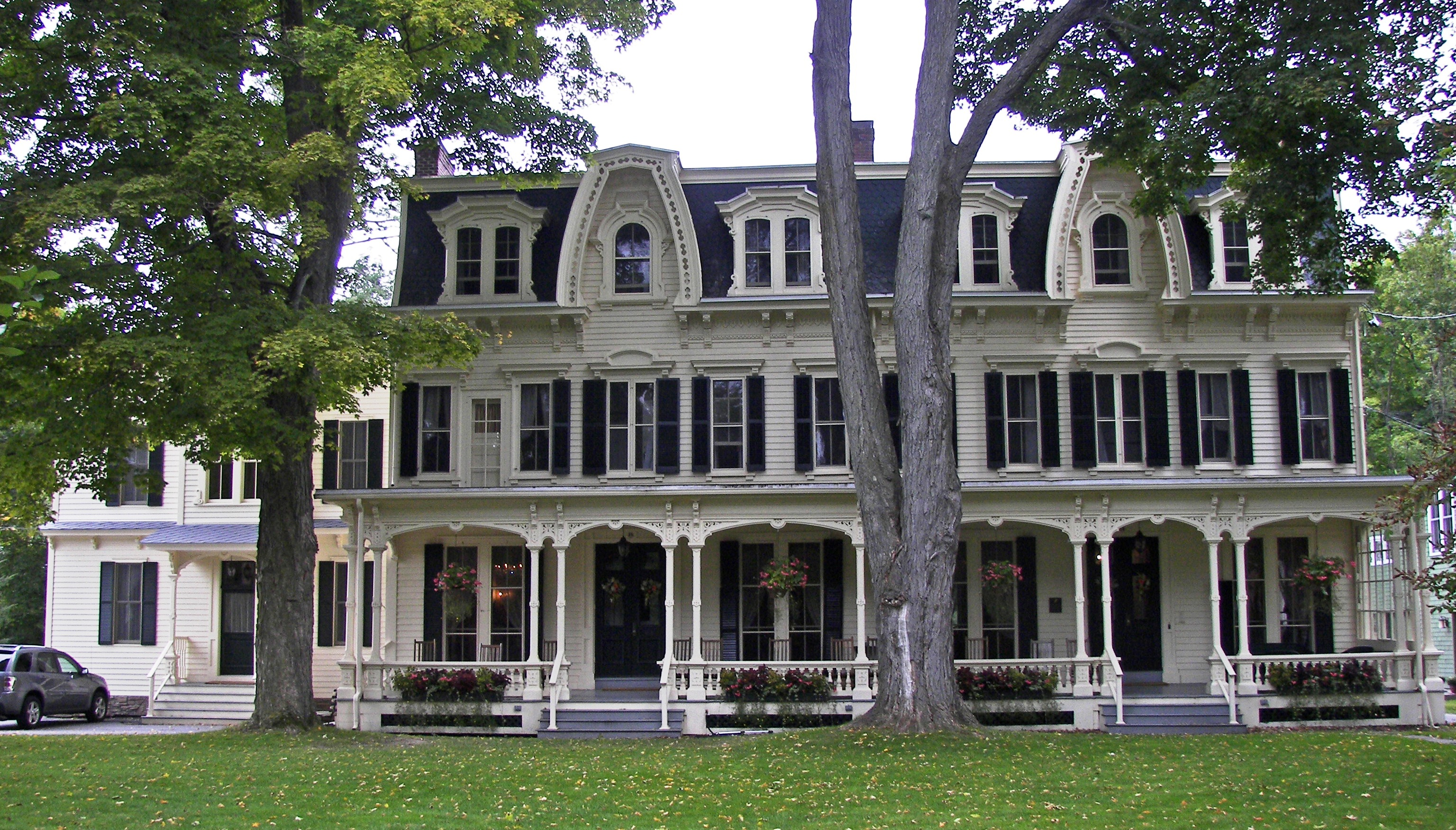
- The Inn at Cooperstown, 2009
- Location: 16 Chestnut Street, Cooperstown, New York
- Built: ca. 1874
- Architect: Henry J. Hardenbergh
- Architectural style: Victorian

The Inn at Cooperstown is a historical hotel located in the Village of Cooperstown, New York on Chestnut Street (NY-80). It was built in 1874. It is built in the Victorian style. The Inn is a contributing building to the Cooperstown Historic District.
