= Iron Clad Building =

Coordinates: 42.700706°N 74.925706°W

- U.S. Historic district – Contributing property
- Location within New York Location within the United States
- Location: 92 Main Street, Cooperstown, New York
- Built: 1862
- Part of: Cooperstown Historic District (ID97000937)

The Iron Clad Building is a landmarked building in Cooperstown, New York. It was built in 1862 by James Bogardus, the pioneer of cast iron architecture. It is a contributing building to the Cooperstown Historic District.
