= United States Post Office (Cooperstown, New York) =

- US Post Office-Cooperstown
- U.S. National Register of Historic Places
- U.S. Historic district – Contributing property
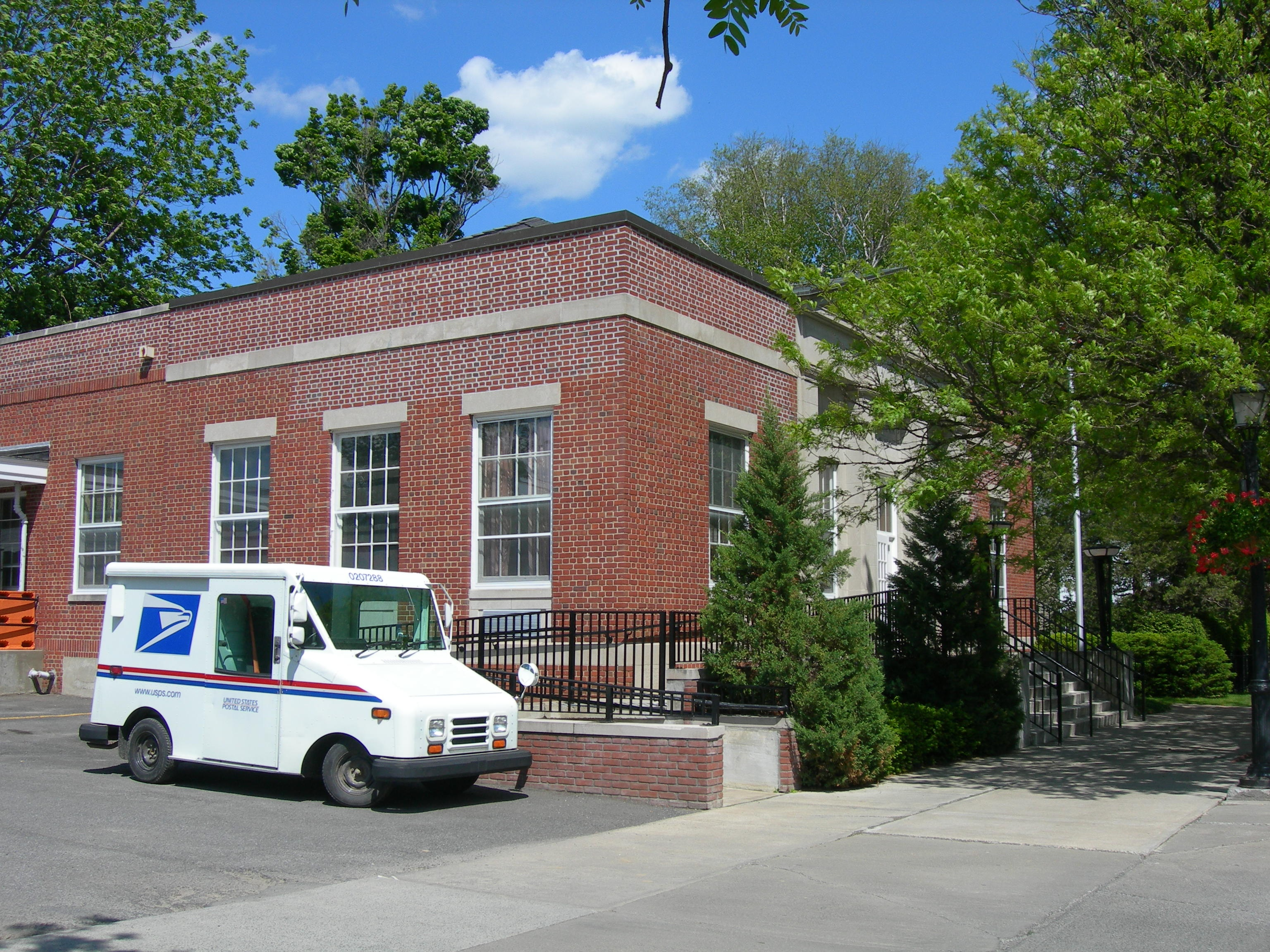
- Front and side of the post office, June 2008

- Location within New York Location within the United States
- Location: 28-40 Main St., Cooperstown, New York
- Coordinates: 42°42′1″N 74°55′24″W
- Area: less than one acre
- Built: 1935
- Architect: Louis A. Simon; Bela Janowsky
- Architectural style: Colonial Revival
- Part of: Cooperstown Historic District (ID80002742)
- MPS: US Post Offices in New York State, 1858-1943, TR
- NRHP reference No.: 88002473
- Added to NRHP: November 17, 1988

US Post Office-Cooperstown is a historic post office building located at Cooperstown in Otsego County, New York, United States. It was built in 1935-1936, and is one of a number of post offices in New York State designed by the Office of the Supervising Architect of the Treasury Department, Louis A. Simon. It is one story in front and two stories in the rear with and exposed basement. It is constructed of brick on a raised concrete foundation and limestone watercourse and beltcourse. The principal facade is symmetrically composed with a three bay pedimented central section faced entirely with ashlar limestone. The building displays Colonial Revival style details. The interior features a 1938 sculpture by artist Bela Janowsky depicting James Fenimore Cooper and two characters from his writings, Chingachgook and Natty Bumpo.

In 1988, the post office was listed on the National Register of Historic Places. It is also a contributing property to the Cooperstown Historic District, which was listed on the National Register in 1980.

== Description ==
From the nomination file: "The building is situated on the north side of Main Street at the eastern edge of the village's central business district. It is isolated from other buildings on Main Street by an alley on its west side and a large landscaped lot to the east at the corner of Fair Street.A cross Main Street, to the south, is the National Baseball Hall of Fame. The post office is set back from the street with mature foundation plantings at the front. On the west side is a parking lot and maneuvering area. The property slopes downward at the rear and along the. eastern side of the building. A retaining wall extends along the north side of the parking area. A stairway leading down from this wall provides access to the exposed basement at the rear of the post office. The building retains its integrity to a high degree on the exterior, although the interior has been altered. [...] "

"Cooperstown Post Office is one story in height in the front and two stories in the rear where the basement is fully exposed. It is constructed on_a raised foundation of poured concrete and brick with facades clad in red brick laid in English bond. Rectangular in shape, it is five bays wide and six bays deep with an unadorned low parapet. A limestone watercourse and beltcourse and low hipped roof distinguish the main section from the rear or workroom section, which is more plainly decorated and has a flat roof. The principal facade is symmetrically composed with a three-bay pedimented central section faced entirely with ashlar limestone. Reminiscent of a Greek- temple, it consists of four square engaged pilasters with molded capitals supporting a plain frieze and shallow pediment. Wide stone steps flanked by Greek-inspired torchere lamps resting on stone wing walls lead to the central entry which contains modern doors. On either side of the entry are windows with eight-over-eight double-hung metal sash. The single bays which flank the central section contain similar windows, each with a limestone lintel and eight-over-eight double-hung sash above a stone panel. "UNITED STATES POST OFFICE COOPERSTOWN NEW YORK" is affixed in bronze letters above the entrance. The three-bay-wide east and west facades of the main section have similar window treatments. The rear section has windows with eight-over-eight sash and four-light transoms on the first floor and smaller windows with eight-over-eight sash on the basement level along the north and east sides.On the west side is a chimney and covered mailing platform."

"The public lobby of the post office building occupies the space behind four of the five bays of the main facade. The postmaster's office is located in the southeast corner of the lobby and the workroom occupies most of the remainder of the first floor. The lobby was completely altered in 1978 and 1981. Originally rectangular, it now features a wide, deep alcove in the center section which contains lock boxes. The ceiling has been dropped and the screenline changed. The only remnant of the original scheme is the paneled wood wainscotting and bulletin cases on the east wall. A cast-metal sculptural relief, once located over the postmaster's door, is now on the wall inside the vestibule. It was executed by Bela Janowsky in 1938 and depicts writer James Fenimore Cooper and two principal characters from his writings, Chingachcook and Natty Bumpo."
