= Cooperstown Historic District =

Historic district in New York, United States

- U.S. National Register of Historic Places
- U.S. Historic district
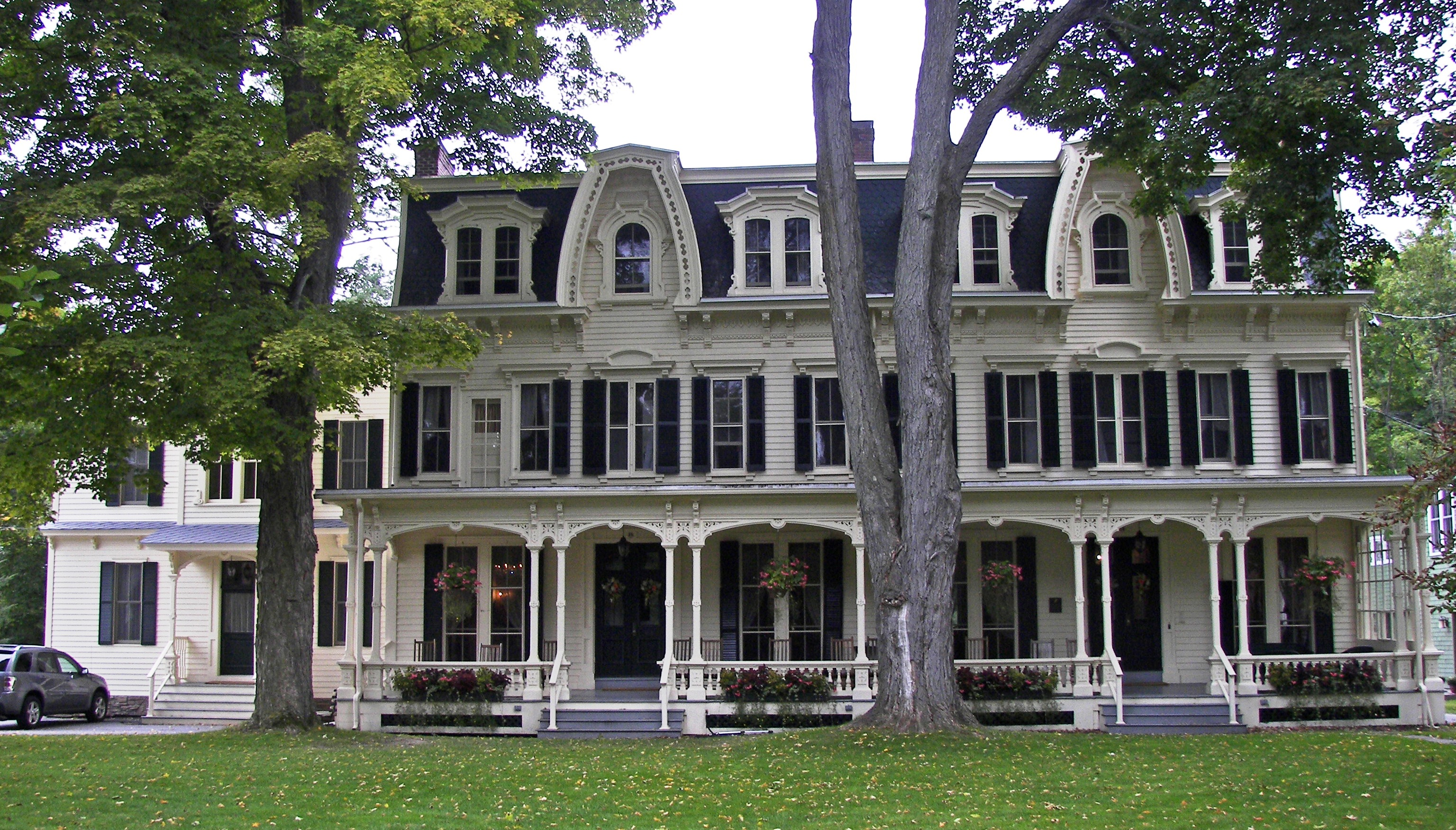
- The Inn at Cooperstown, built in 1874

- Location within New York Location within the United States
- Location: NY 28, NY 80 and Main St., Cooperstown, New York
- Coordinates: 42°42′7″N 74°55′32″W
- Area: 414 acres (168 ha)
- Built: various
- Architect: various
- Architectural style: Late 19th And 20th Century Revivals, Greek Revival, Italianate, Colonial Revival
- NRHP reference No.: 80002742 (original); 97000937 (increase)

Significant dates
- Added to NRHP: November 18, 1980
- Boundary increase: August 21, 1997

The Cooperstown Historic District is a national historic district in Cooperstown, New York, that was listed on the National Register of Historic Places in 1980. It encompasses 232 contributing properties: 226 contributing buildings, 1 contributing site, 3 contributing structures, and 2 contributing objects. Among the contributing properties is the village's post office, which is individually listed on the National Register.

In 1997, the boundaries of the historic district were increased to include the Fenimore Farm Stone Agricultural Buildings that were built in 1918 and designed by Frank P. Whiting.

Cooperstown was settled in the late 18th century by William Cooper, father of novelist James Fenimore Cooper, some of whose novels were set in and around Cooperstown.

== Contributing buildings ==
- Byberry Cottage
- Doubleday Field
- Edgewater
- Elleryt Cory House
- Iron Clad Building
- Lakelands
- Otsego County Bank
- Pomeroy Place
- The Inn at Cooperstown
- The Otesaga Hotel
- United States Post Office
- Woodside Hall

== See also ==
- National Register of Historic Places listings in Otsego County, New York
