= Stephen Carlton Clark =

American politician, businessman, and philanthropist

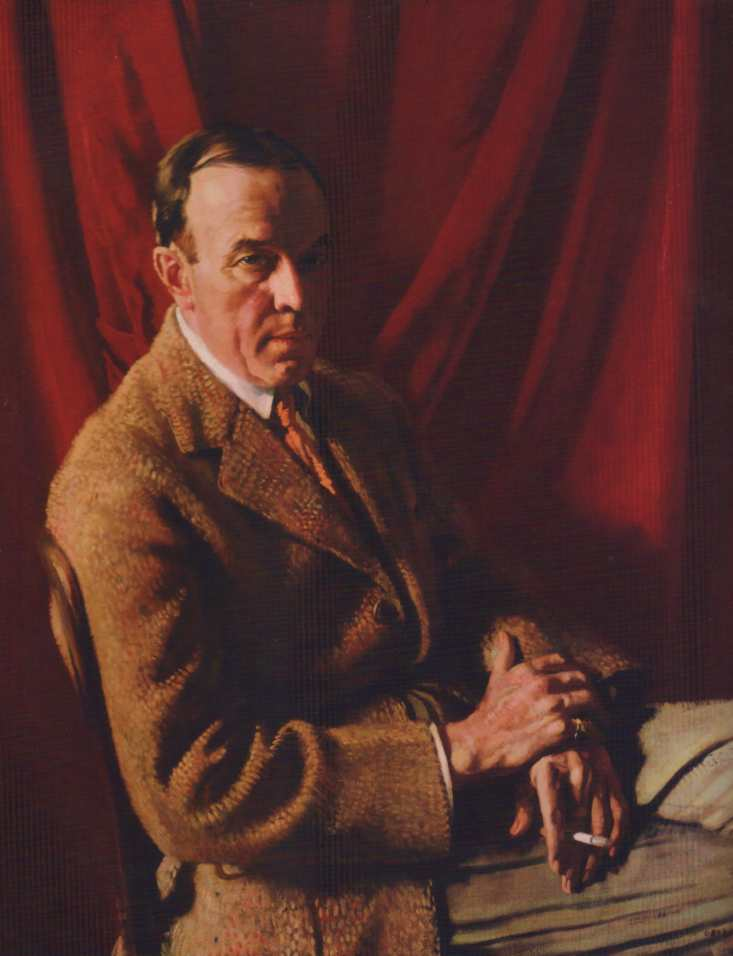
- Stephen Carlton Clark (c.1921) by William Orpen

Member of the New York State Assembly from Otsego County
- In office January 1, 1910 – December 31, 1910
- Preceded by: Charles Smith
- Succeeded by: Chester A. Miller

Personal details
- Born: August 29, 1882 Cooperstown, New York, US
- Died: September 17, 1960 (aged 78) New York City, US
- Party: Republican
- Spouse: Susan Vanderpoel Hun (m. 1909)
- Children: 5
- Parent(s): Alfred Corning Clark; Elizabeth Scriven
- Relatives: Edward Severin Clark (brother); Robert Sterling Clark (brother); F. Ambrose Clark (brother); Jane Forbes Clark (granddaughter)
- Education: Phillips Academy
- Alma mater: Yale University; Columbia Law School
- Occupation: Businessman, newspaper publisher
- Known for: Founder of the National Baseball Hall of Fame

Stephen Carlton Clark (August 29, 1882 – September 17, 1960) was an American art collector, businessman, newspaper publisher and philanthropist. He may be best known as the founder of the Baseball Hall of Fame, in Cooperstown, New York.

== Biography ==
Stephen C. Clark was the youngest of the four sons of Alfred Corning Clark and Elizabeth (née Scriven) Clark. His grandfather, Edward Cabot Clark, had been Isaac Singer's lawyer and partner in the Singer Sewing Machine Company. His father inherited a 37.5% stake in the company, and invested the profits in New York City real estate. Alfred died in April 1896, leaving a $30,000,000 family trust to his widow and sons.

Clark was educated at Phillips Academy (Andover), Yale University (B.A. 1903) and Columbia Law School (1907).

Following his graduation from law school, Clark became a director of the Singer Manufacturing Company. He and his brother Edward built the Otesaga Hotel in Cooperstown in 1909. That same year, he was elected to the New York State Assembly as a Republican from Otsego County (133rd New York State Legislature).

Clark served in the U.S. Army during World War I, attaining the rank of lieutenant-colonel and was awarded the Distinguished Service Medal. In the 1920s, he was the owner and publisher of three Albany, New York newspapers, including the Albany Evening Journal (purchased from William Barnes Jr.).

=== Philanthropy ===
Clark established cultural institutions in his home town of Cooperstown. He founded the Baseball Hall of Fame and paid for construction of its building, which opened in 1939. He offered his late brother Edward's country estate to the New York State Historical Association, which moved its headquarters to Cooperstown in 1939. The estate's mansion houses the Fenimore Art Museum, whose collection of American paintings and folk art Clark greatly expanded in the 1940s and 1950s. He founded what is now the Fenimore Farm & Country Village in 1942, which features a large collection of farm tools and equipment housed in Edward's former dairy barn. Its attractions include a village of relocated 19th-century buildings staffed by interpreters in vintage costume, including a blacksmith's forge and a working carousel. The museums are across New York State Route 80 from each other, on land once owned by James Fenimore Cooper.

Clark's brother Edward founded Cooperstown's Mary Imogene Bassett Hospital in 1918. Named for a local physician, Edward paid for construction of its 100-bed building. The hospital housed wounded World War I veterans for several years, before opening to the public on June 1, 1922. The largest cash bequest made by Stephen C. Clark in his will was to Bassett Hospital: $6,000,000.

Clark was a trustee of the Metropolitan Museum of Art from 1932 to 1945, and from 1950 to his death in 1960. He served as the Met's vice president from 1941 to 1945. He was a founding trustee of the Museum of Modern Art in 1929, and served as chairman of its board of trustees from 1939 to 1946. His chairmanship is remembered primarily for his unpopular 1943 firing of MoMA's founding director, Alfred H. Barr Jr. He also served on the board of Roosevelt Hospital, and on numerous corporate boards.

=== Personal life ===
Clark was age 13 when his father died. Following six years as a widow, his mother married Bishop Henry Codman Potter (1834–1908), of the Episcopal Diocese of New York, on October 4, 1902.

On February 20, 1909, Clark married Susan Vanderpoel Hun (1889–1967), the daughter of an Albany lawyer and a family friend since childhood. Clark and his bride were honeymooning in Europe when his mother died on March 4, 1909.

Stephen and Susan Clark were the parents of five children:

- Elizabeth Clark Labouisse (1909–1945)
- Stephen Carlton Clark Jr. (1911–1992)
- Peter Gansevoort Clark (1915–1915), died in infancy.
- Alfred Corning Clark II (1916–1961)
- Robert Vanderpoel Clark (1917–1952).

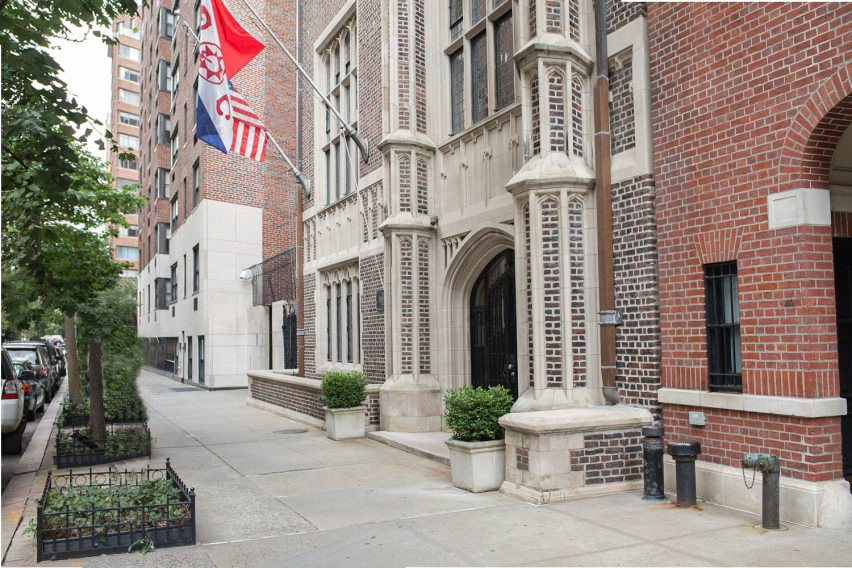
The Explorers Club, 46 East 70th Street, Manhattan

Clark hired architect Frederick Sterner to design a 5-story Jacobean Revival city house at 46 East 70th Street, Manhattan. The residence was completed in 1912, and was used by Clark and his family until his death in 1960. It has housed The Explorers Club since 1964.

In 1923, Clark and his brother Sterling entered into a famous feud that lasted until their deaths. The terms of their family trust limited its beneficiaries to the four brothers and their natural issue. Sterling had married French actress Francine Clark in 1919, becoming step-father to her daughter Viviane. He sought approval from his brothers to change the terms of the family trust to make Viviane a beneficiary. Stephen, the only one of the brothers who had fathered children, refused to approve the change. In response, Sterling withdrew his quarter of the trust's assets, sold his properties in Cooperstown, and never spoke to Stephen again.

Stephen C. Clark died on September 17, 1960, in New York City. Upon his death, his two surviving children became beneficiaries of the family trust. With the 1964 death of F. Ambrose Clark, the last of the four brothers, Stephen's one surviving child, Stephen Carlton Clark Jr., became the sole beneficiary of the family trust.

=== Legacy ===
Clark established The Clark Foundation in 1931, to support Bassett Hospital and other Cooperstown charitable institutions. The foundation currently funds local museums, libraries, community organizations and village services, supports the summer Glimmerglass Opera Festival, and provides college scholarships for area students. It also operates the Clark Sports Center in Cooperstown, a vast athletic facility that is also used by the Baseball Hall of Fame for its annual induction ceremonies. In New York City, the foundation supports education, community organizations and cultural institutions. As of 2013, The Clark Foundation's assets were in excess of $600,000,000.

Yale University awarded Clark an honorary degree of Doctor of Humane Letters in 1957.

The International House of New York's Stephen C. Clark Fund, established in 1960 by a bequest from his estate, funds scholarships and stipends for foreign students.

Clark served as chairman of the board of directors of the Baseball Hall of Fame, as did his son Stephen C. Clark Jr. Jane Forbes Clark II, daughter of Stephen C. Clark Jr. and Jane Forbes (née Wilbur) Clark, has served on the board since 1992, and been its chairman since 2000.

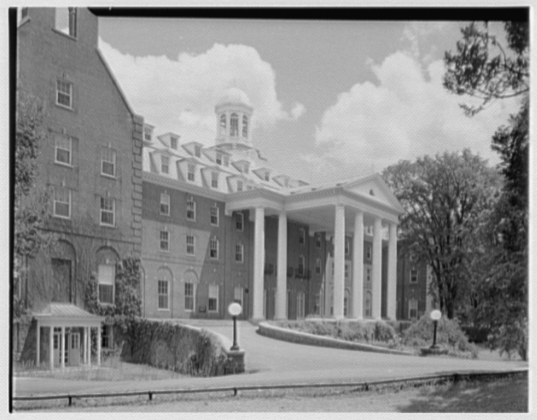
Otesaga Hotel, Cooperstown, New York

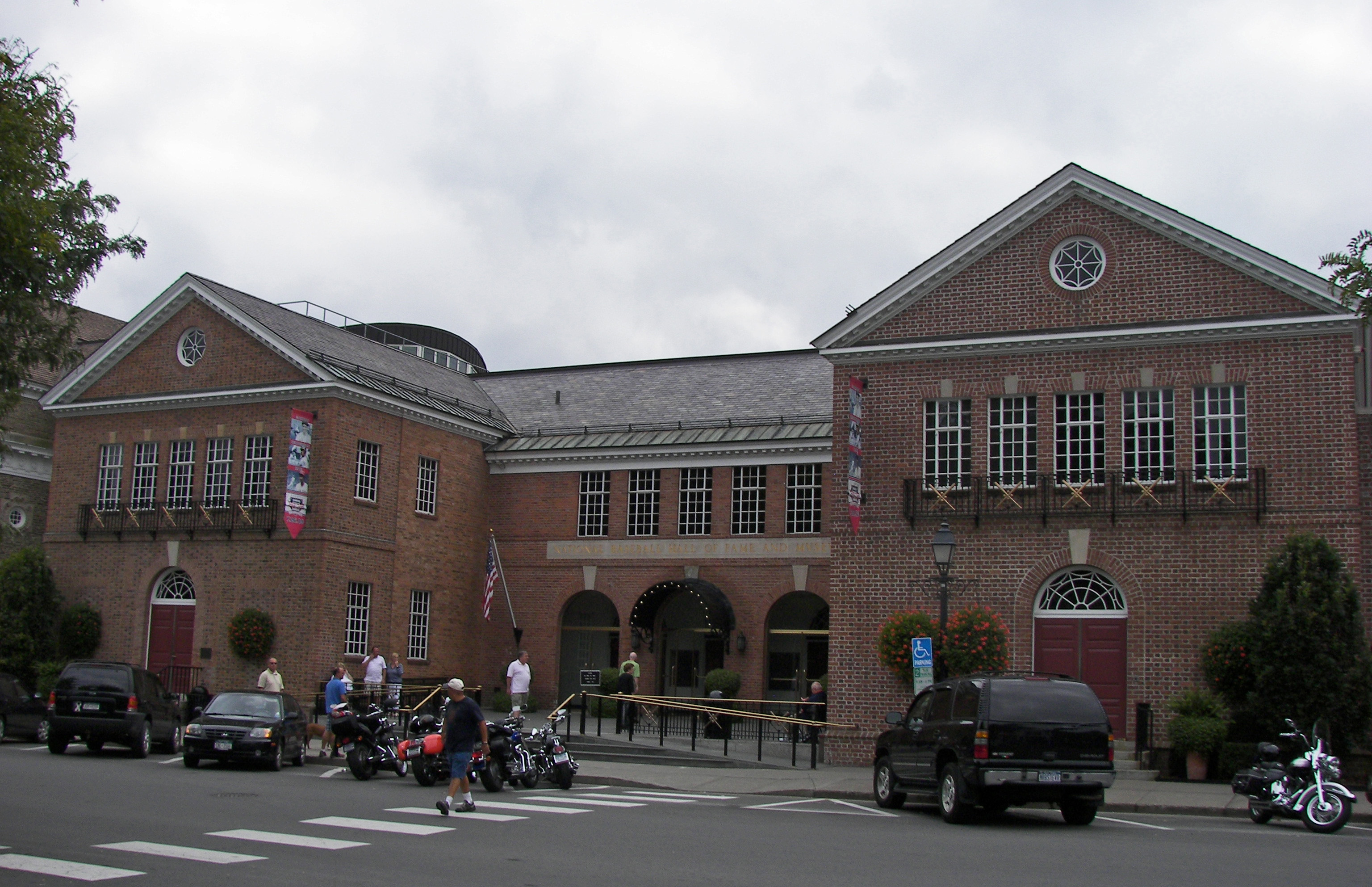
National Baseball Hall of Fame, Cooperstown, New York

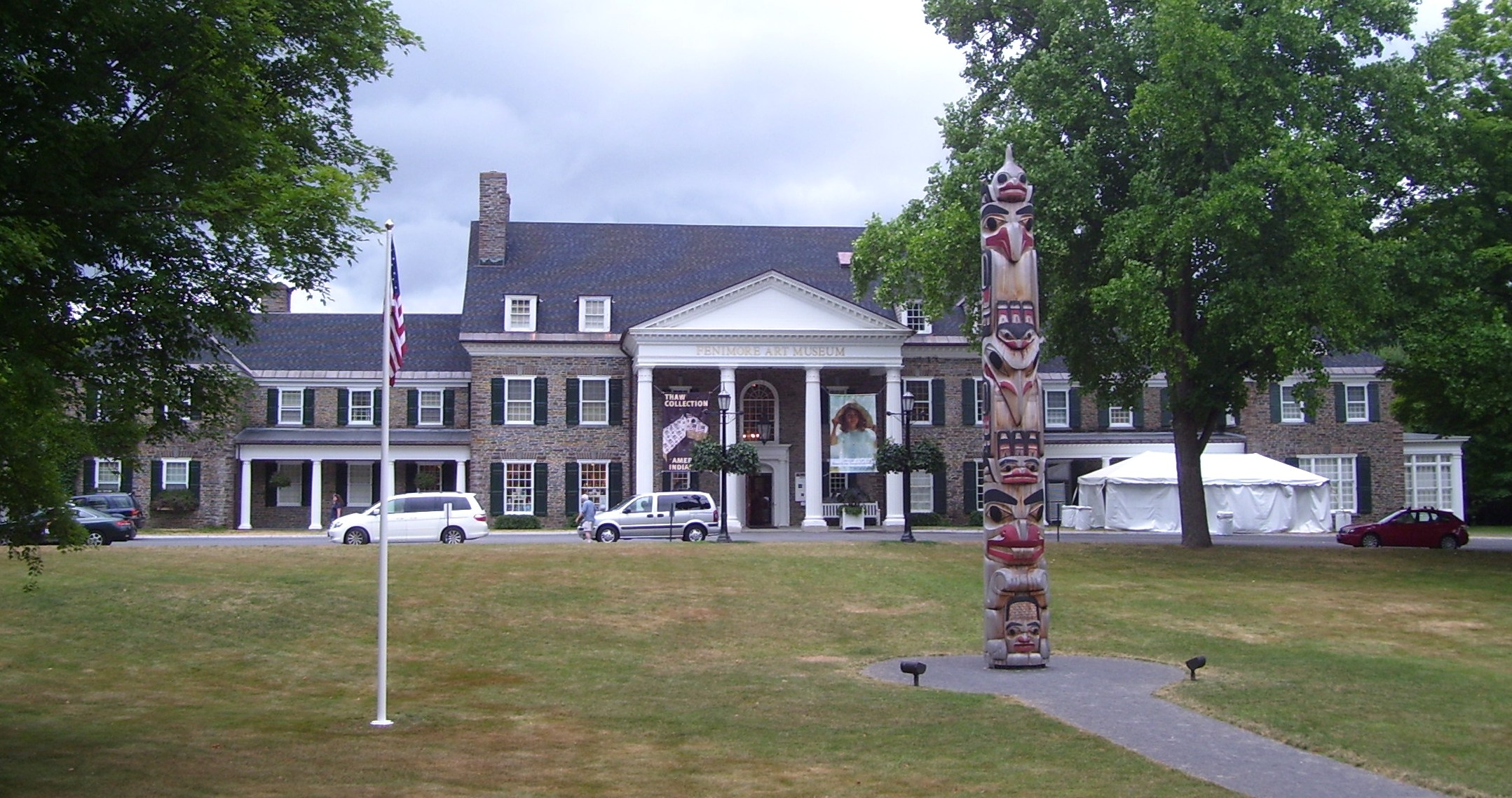
Fenimore Art Museum, Cooperstown, New York

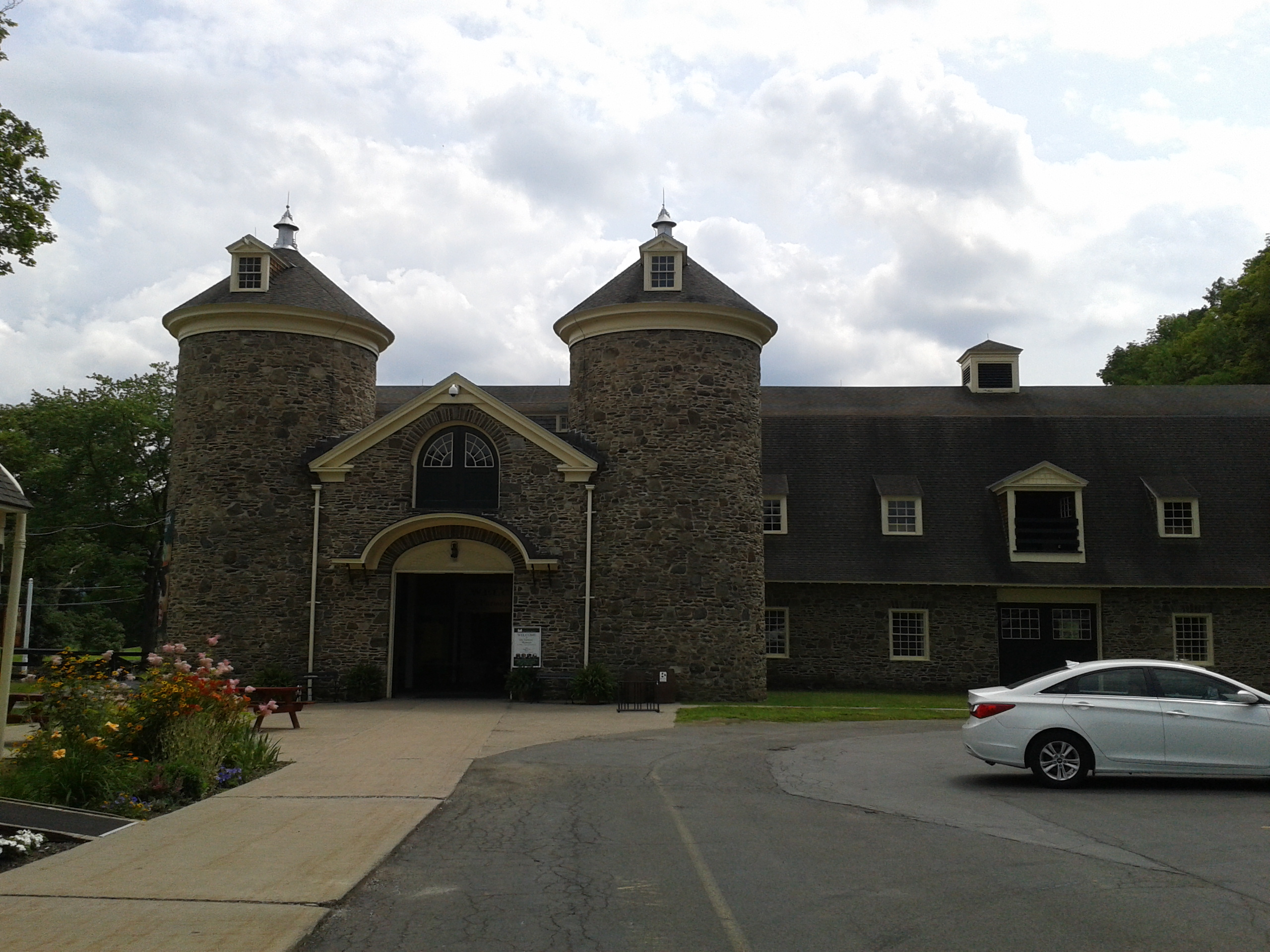
Fenimore Farm & Country Village, Cooperstown, New York

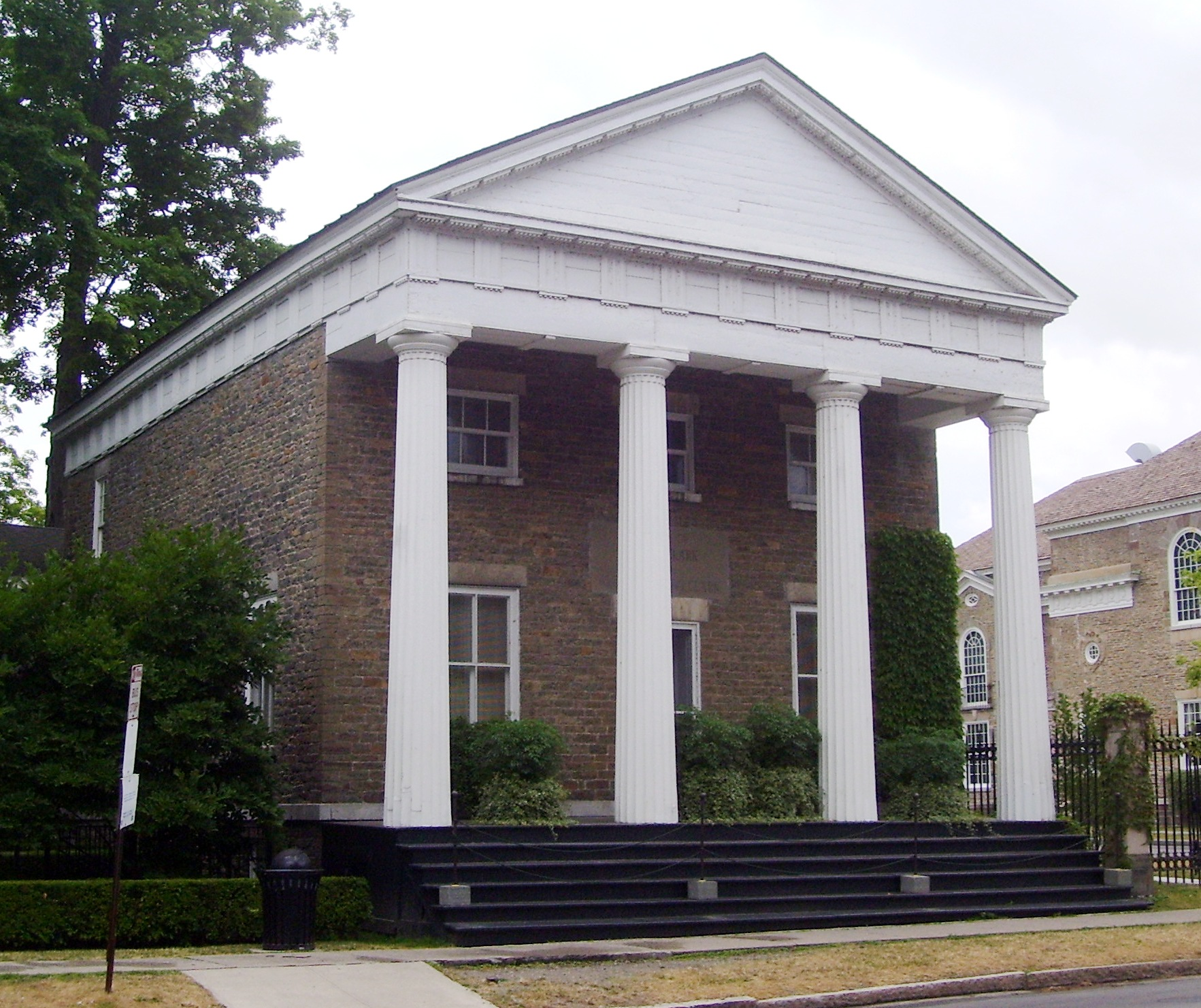
The Clark Estates offices, Cooperstown, New York

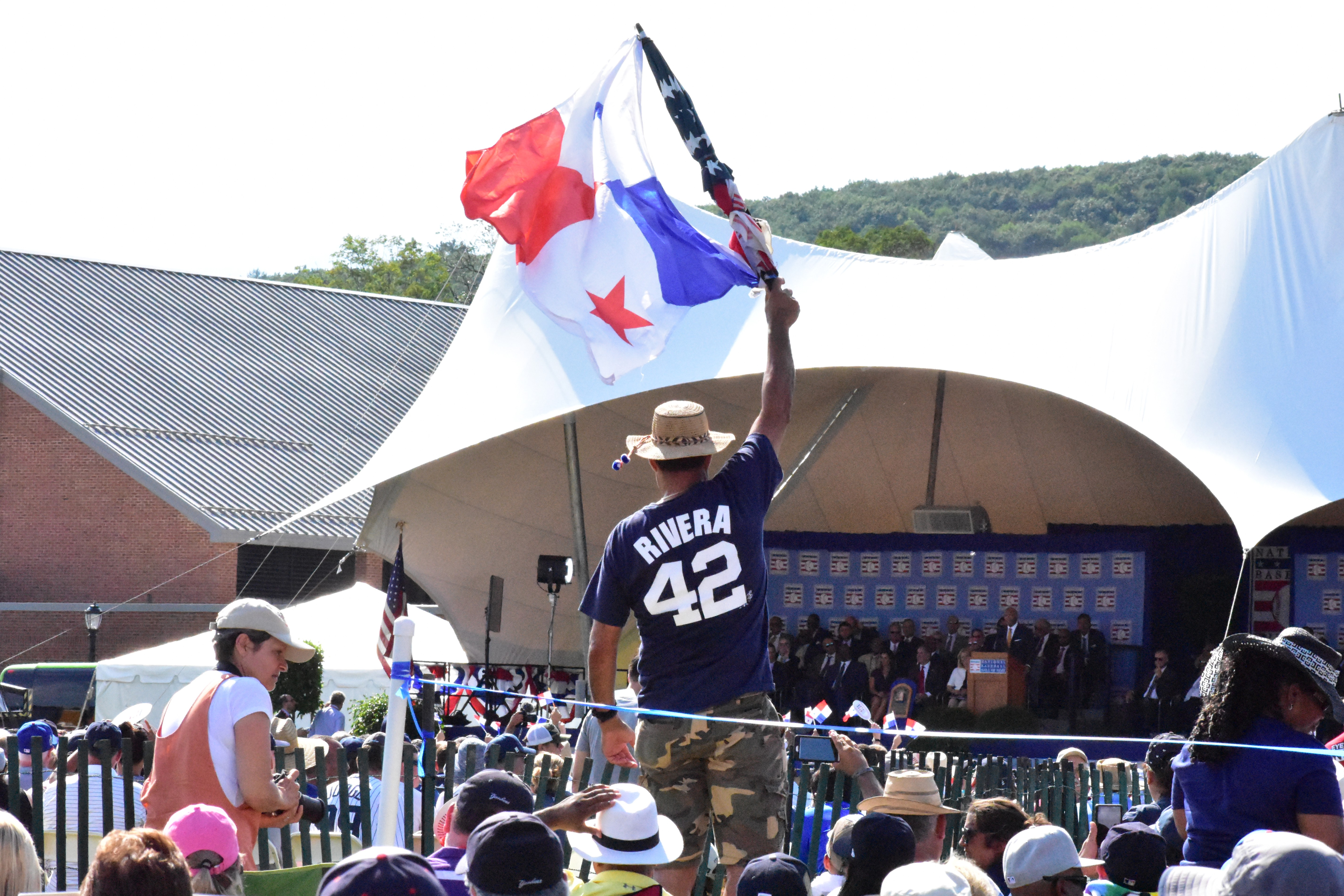
2019 Baseball Hall of Fame Induction Ceremony, outside Clark Sports Center

== Art collection ==
Stephen C. Clark was an avid art collector, with voluminous holdings ranging from Old Masters, French Impressionists and Early Modernists to American colonial portraits, Hudson River School works, American genre paintings and American folk art. As a young man, he helped to organize the 1913 Armory Show, and purchased the most expensive sculpture in the exhibition: Wilhelm Lehmbruck's Standing Woman (later donated by Clark to MoMA). He acquired 13 works by Matisse by the early 1930s, which he exhibited in the "Matisse Room" of his city house. He sold or gave away the Matisses prior to his death. Stephen C. Clark assembled a choice collection of works by American painter Thomas Eakins, some purchased from the artist's widow, which he bequeathed to the Yale University Art Gallery, the Addison Gallery of American Art, and the National Gallery of Art in Washington, D.C. The 40 paintings he left to Yale also included works by Frans Hals, Van Gogh, Manet, Winslow Homer and George Wesley Bellows. His bequests to the Metropolitan Museum of Art included paintings by Renoir, Degas, Seurat and Cezanne, along with a $500,000 cash bequest to install air-conditioning and smoke detectors in its Fifth Avenue building.

Stephen C. Clark's brothers Sterling and Ambrose also were art collectors—Sterling collected 39 paintings by Renoir, and founded the Sterling and Francine Clark Art Institute in Williamstown, Massachusetts; "Brose" collected equestrian art—but the family feud ended the possibility of consolidating all three collections in a single museum at Cooperstown. In 2006, the Clark Art Institute mounted an exhibition that provided a glimpse of what might have been. The Clark Brothers Collect: Impressionist and Early Modern Paintings featured masterpieces from Sterling's collection hanging alongside masterpieces once owned by Stephen. The exhibition traveled to the Metropolitan Museum of Art in 2007.

Stephen C. Clark bought Rembrandt's St. James the Greater (1661) about 1954, and his family loaned it to a series of museums after his death. In 2007, in the possession of The Clark Estates Inc. (overseen by granddaughter Jane Forbes Clark II), it was auctioned at Sotheby's New York for $25,800,000.

=== Lawsuits ===
In May, 2009, a lawsuit was filed against Yale University regarding Vincent van Gogh's The Night Café (1888). Pierre Konowaloff, heir to the estate of his great-grandfather Ivan Morozov, alleged in the suit that the painting had been illegally taken by the Soviet government in 1920. Clark acquired it in 1933, and bequeathed it to Yale in 1960. Konowaloff's suit argued that Yale should have questioned the propriety of Clark's purchase (76 years earlier), and that the court could not deem the university to be the painting's rightful owner. "Stephen C. Clark either had actual knowledge, or reasonably should have known, that Russia had no legal title to the painting when he sought to acquire it in 1933."

Konowaloff filed a similar lawsuit against the Metropolitan Museum of Art, seeking the return of Paul Cézanne's 1891 portrait of his wife—which had been a 1960 bequest by Clark. In September, 2011 the U.S. District Court in Manhattan granted the Met's motion to dismiss the suit: "The Court found that Mr. Konowaloff’s claim would require it to question the validity of the Soviet Union’s taking Cézanne’s portrait of his wife as part of its nationalization of private property after the Russian Revolution, which the Court, under longstanding precedent of the 'act of state' doctrine, refused to do. Under that doctrine, the acts of a sovereign government are legitimate, official acts."

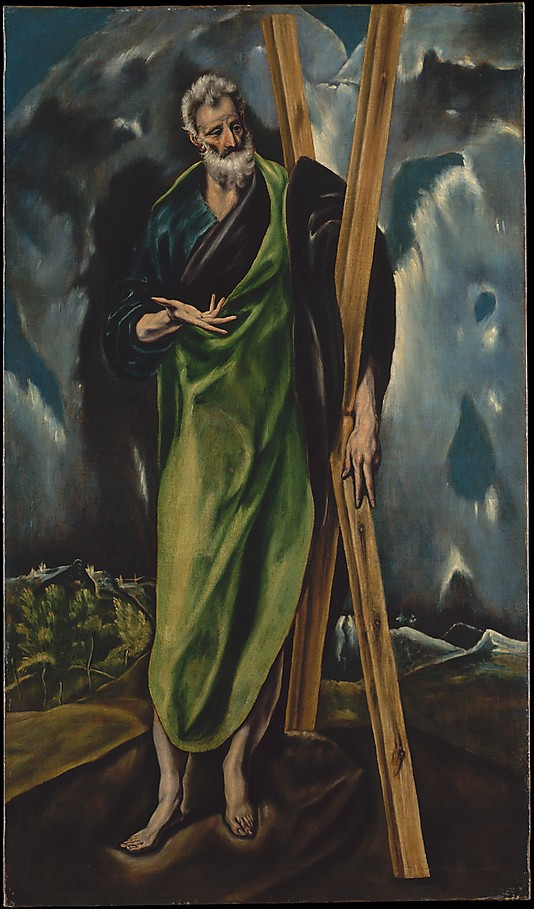
Saint Andrew (c.1610) by Workshop of El Greco. Bequest to the Metropolitan Museum of Art.

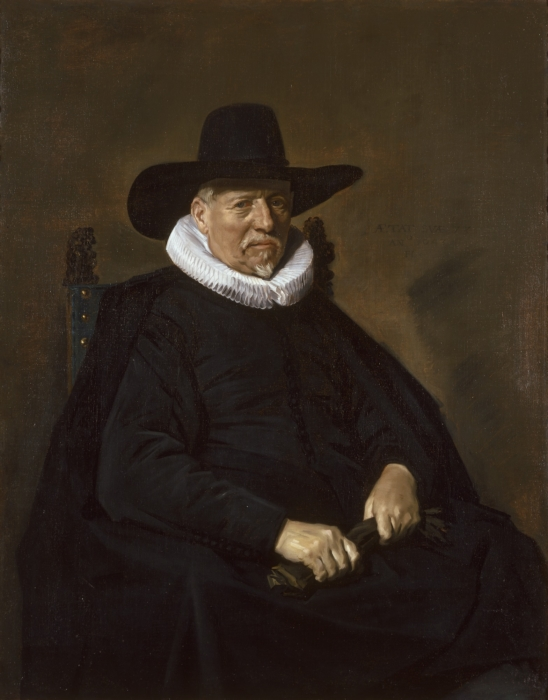
Portrait of de Heer Bodolphe (1643) by Frans Hals. Bequest to Yale University Art Gallery.

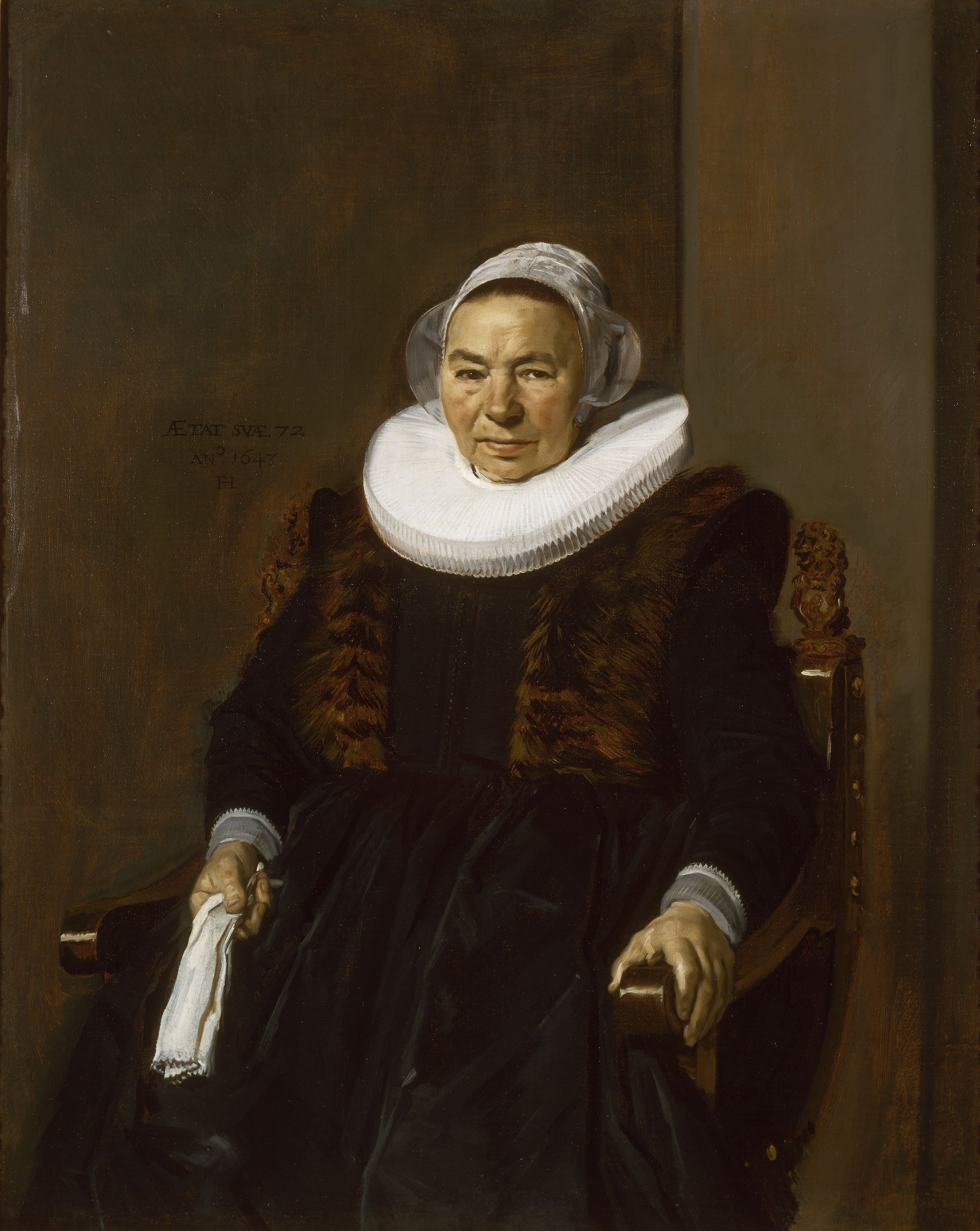
Portrait of Mevrouw Bodolphe (1643) by Frans Hals. Bequest to Yale University Art Gallery.

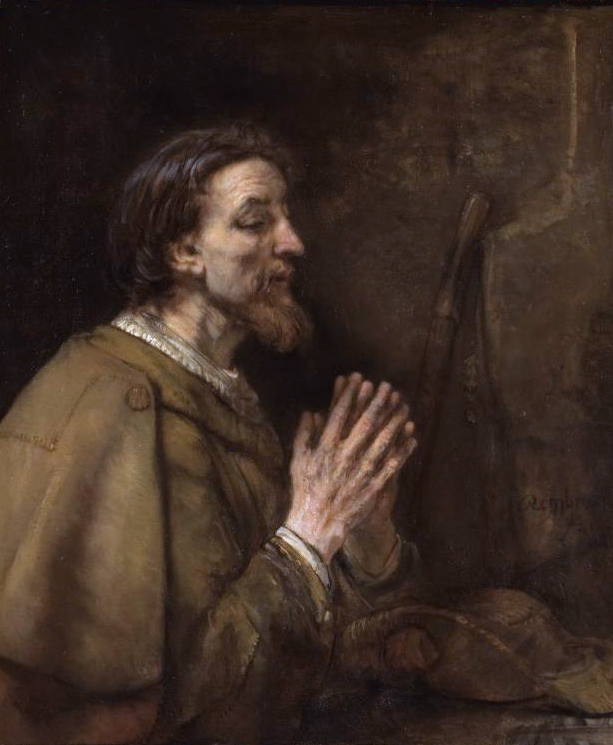
St. James the Greater (1661) by Rembrandt. Private collection.

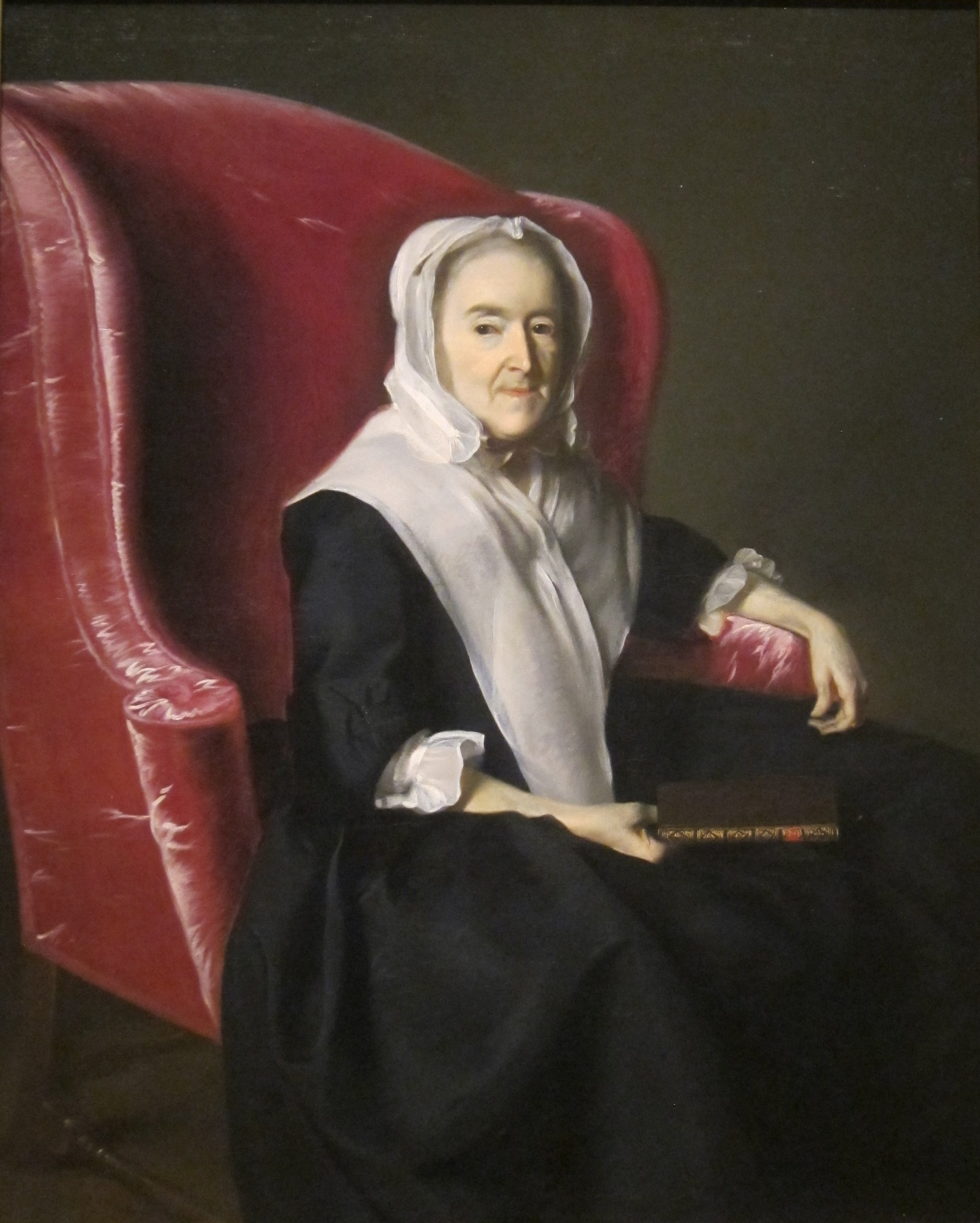
Mrs. Anna Drummer Powell (1764) by John Singleton Copley. Bequest to Yale University Art Gallery.

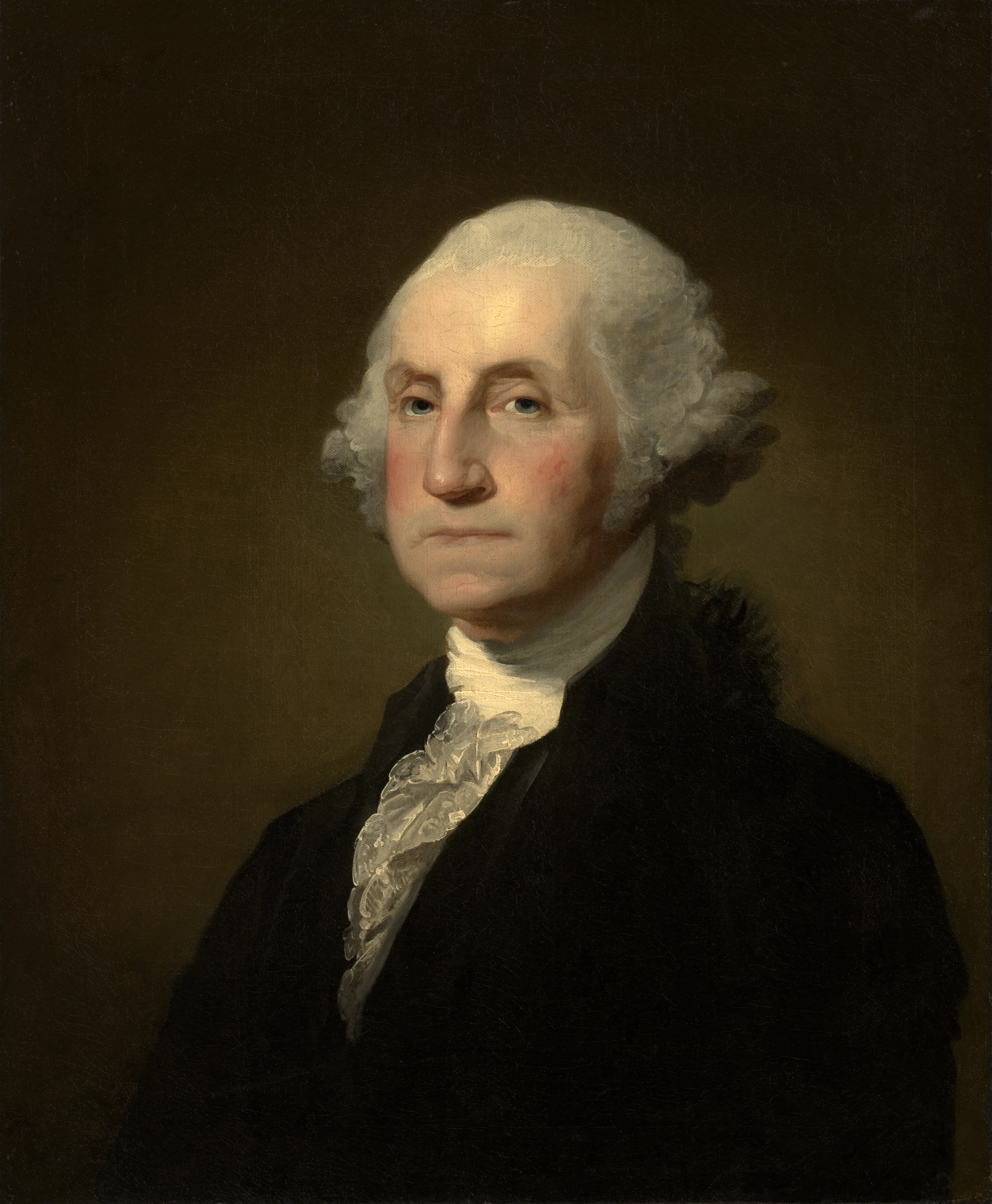
George Washington (1797) by Gilbert Stuart. Clark Art Institute.

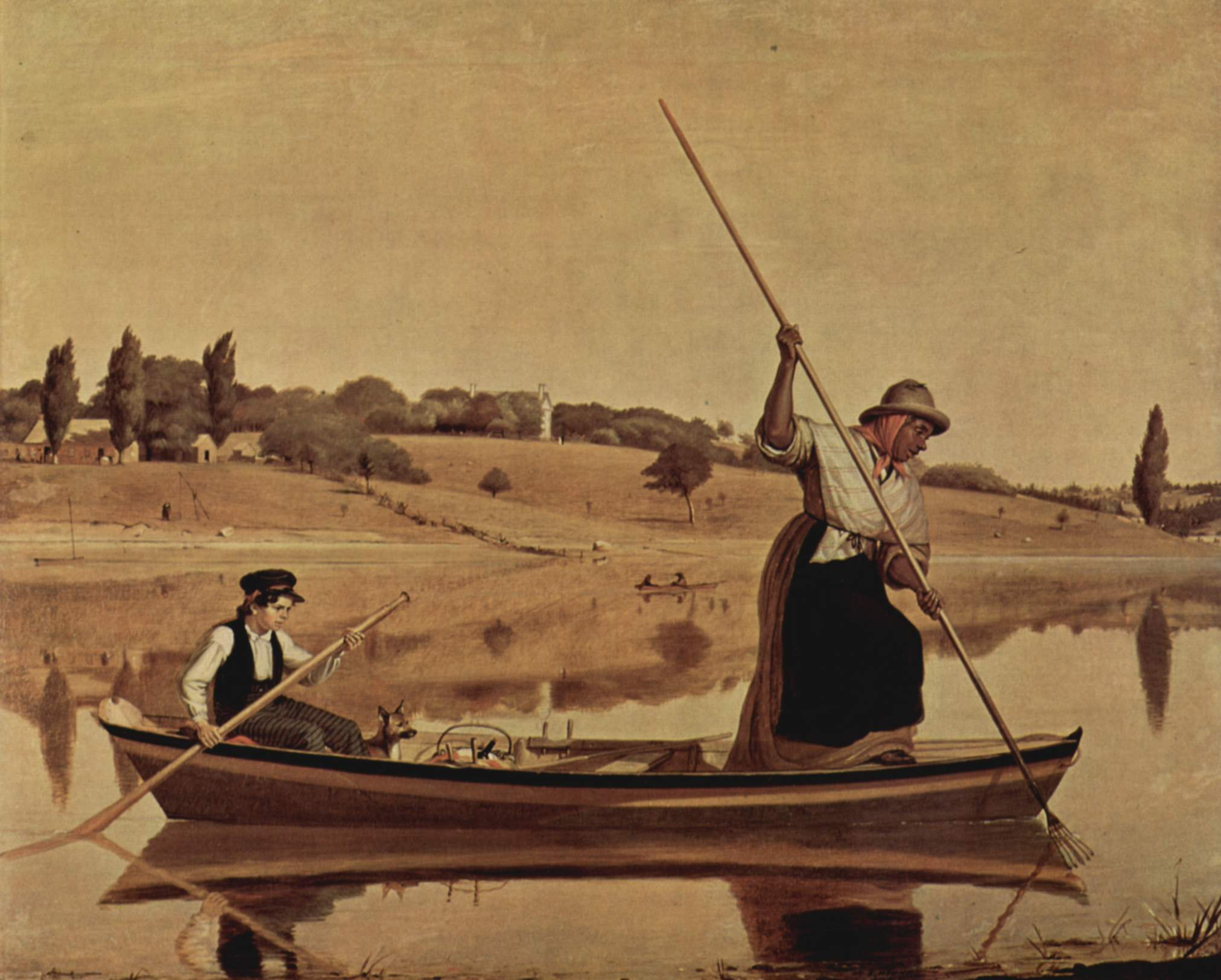
Eel Spearing at Setauket (1845) by William Sidney Mount. 1942 gift to the Fenimore Art Museum.

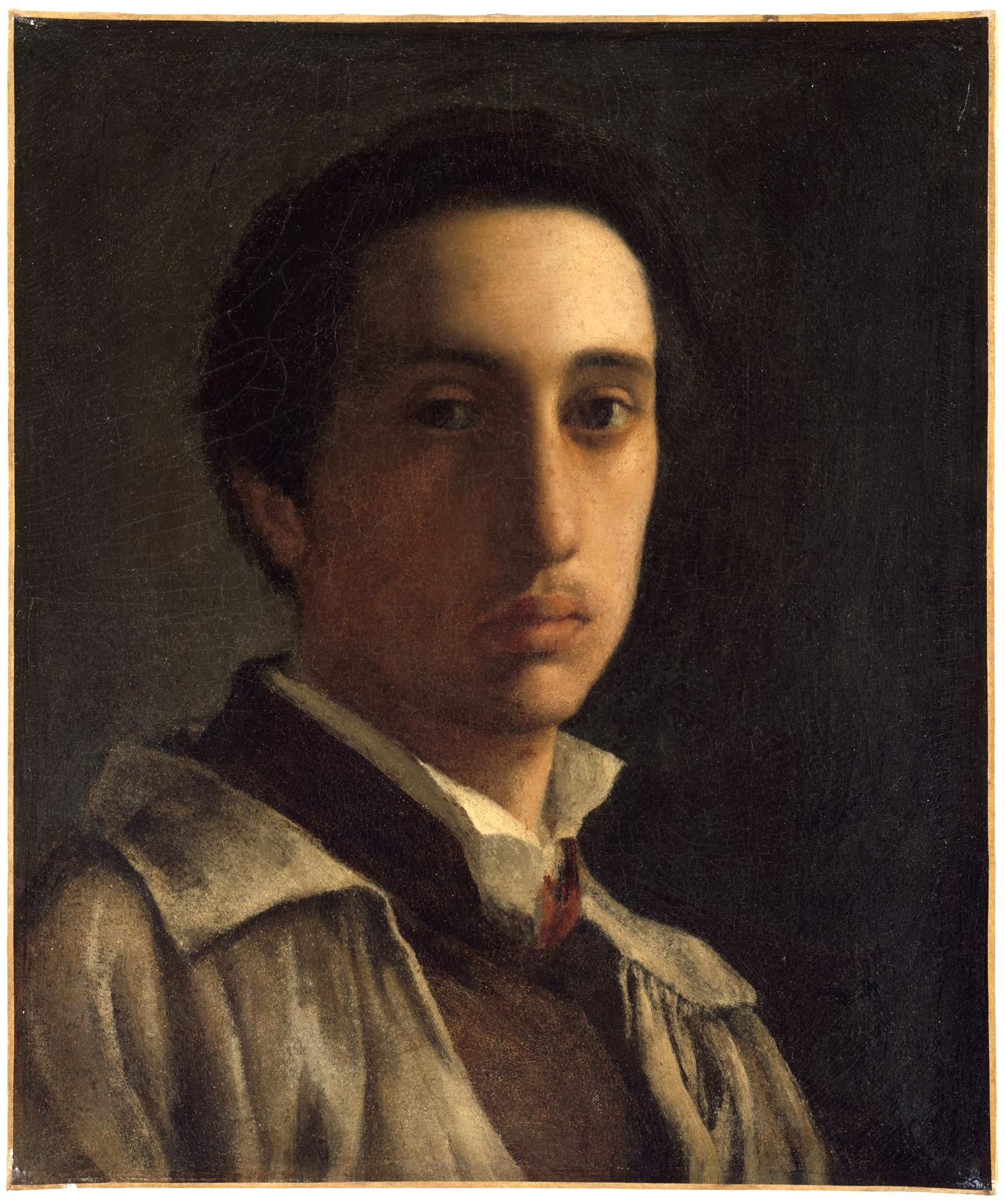
Self-Portrait (c. 1855–1856) by Degas. Bequest to the Metropolitan Museum of Art.

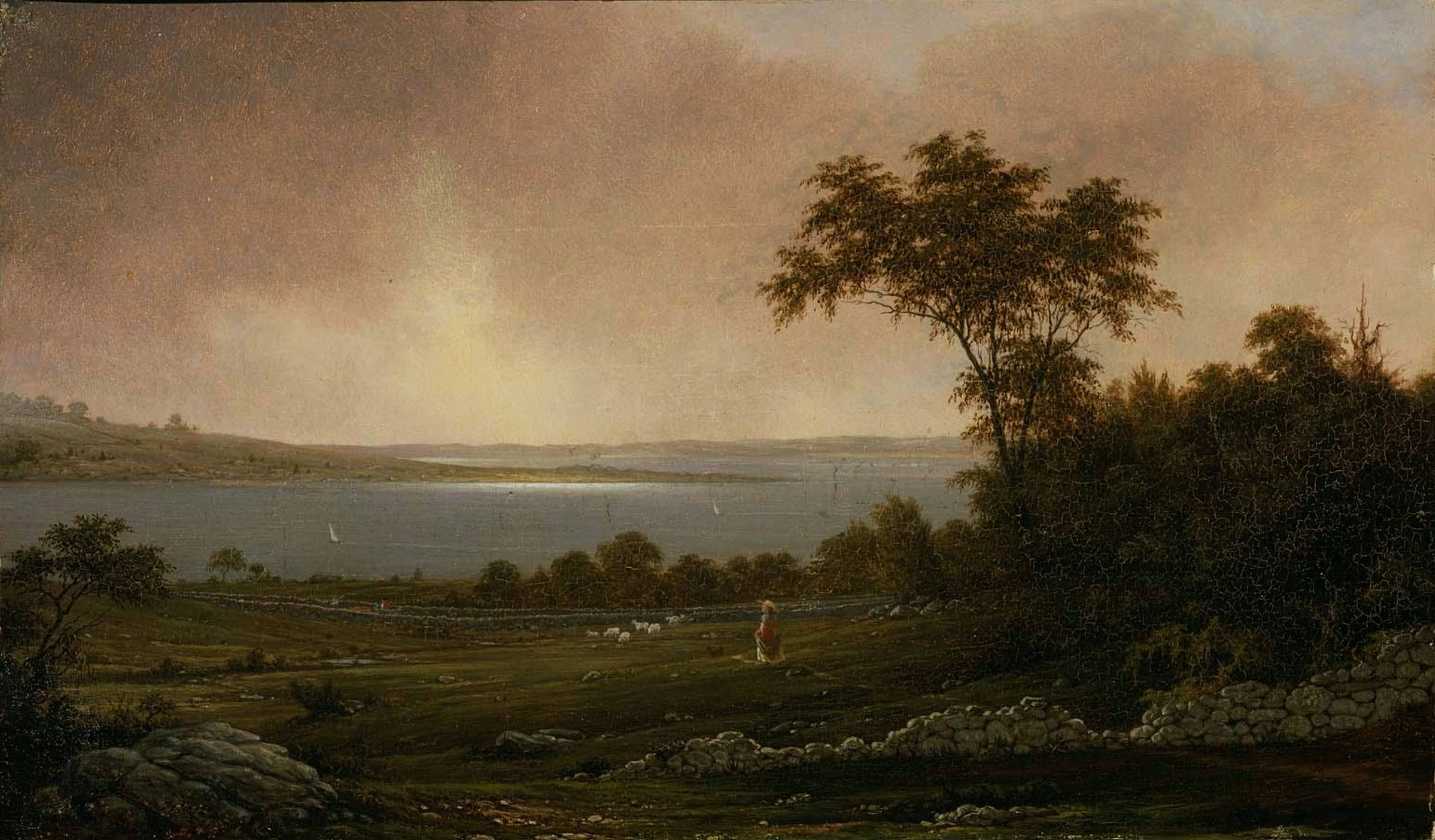
Rhode Island Landscape (1859) by Martin Johnson Heade. Metropolitan Museum of Art.

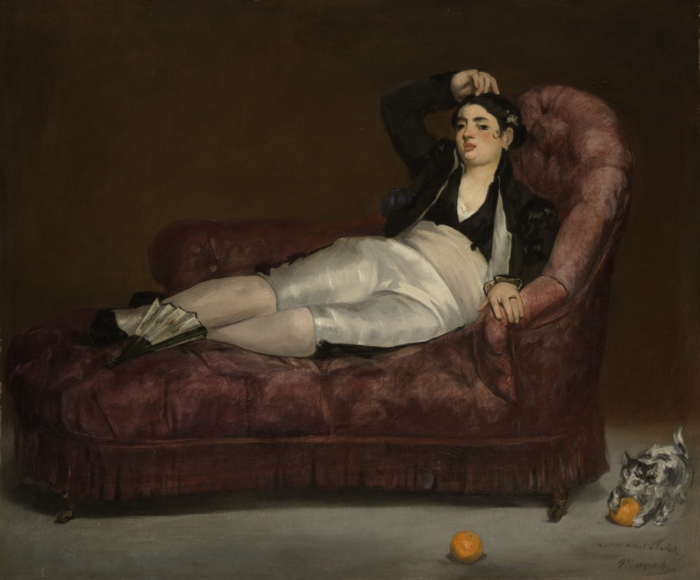
Young Woman Reclining in a Spanish Costume (1862–63) by Manet. Bequest to Yale University Art Gallery.

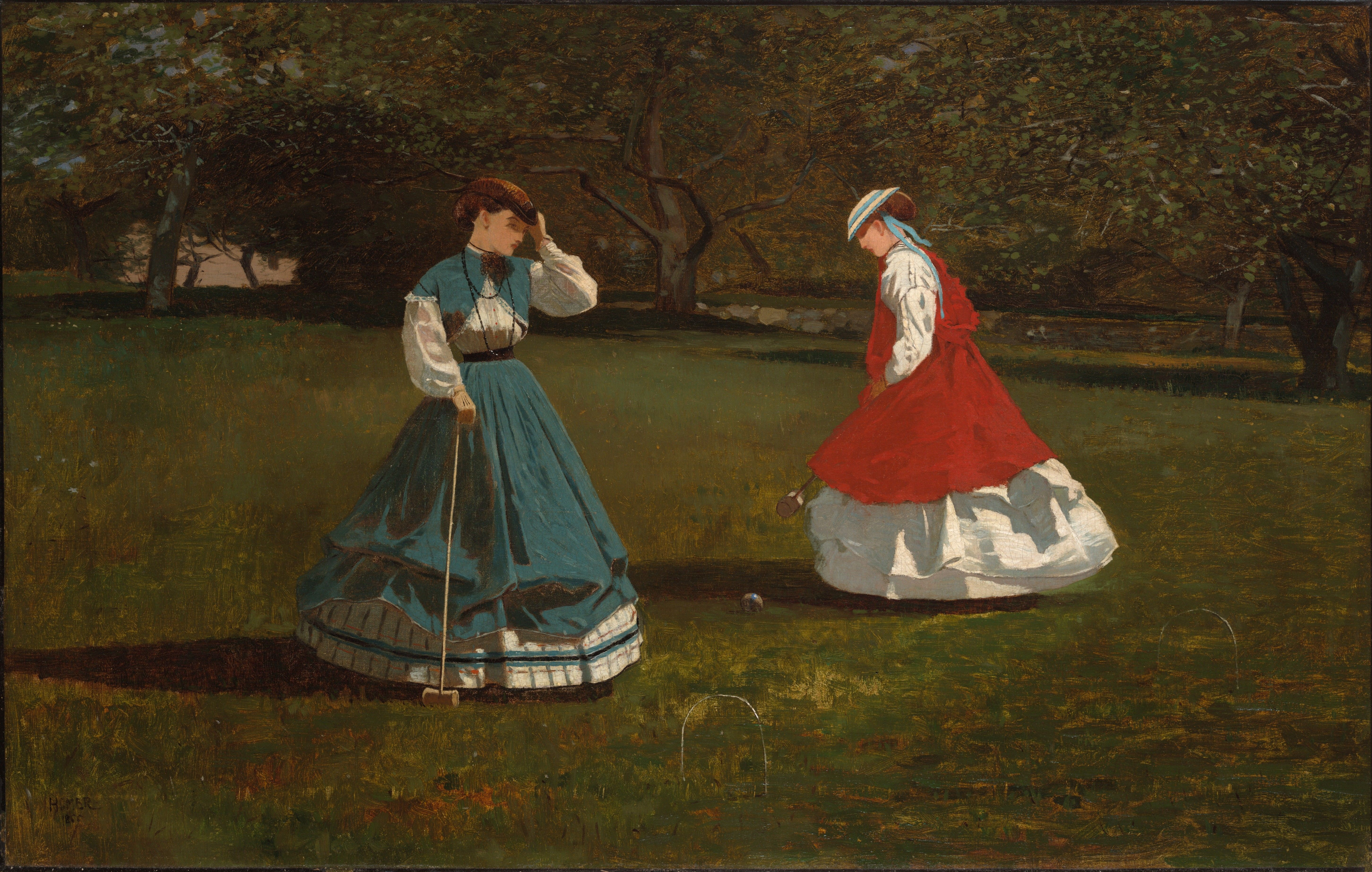
A Game of Croquet (1866) by Winslow Homer. Bequest to Yale University Art Gallery.

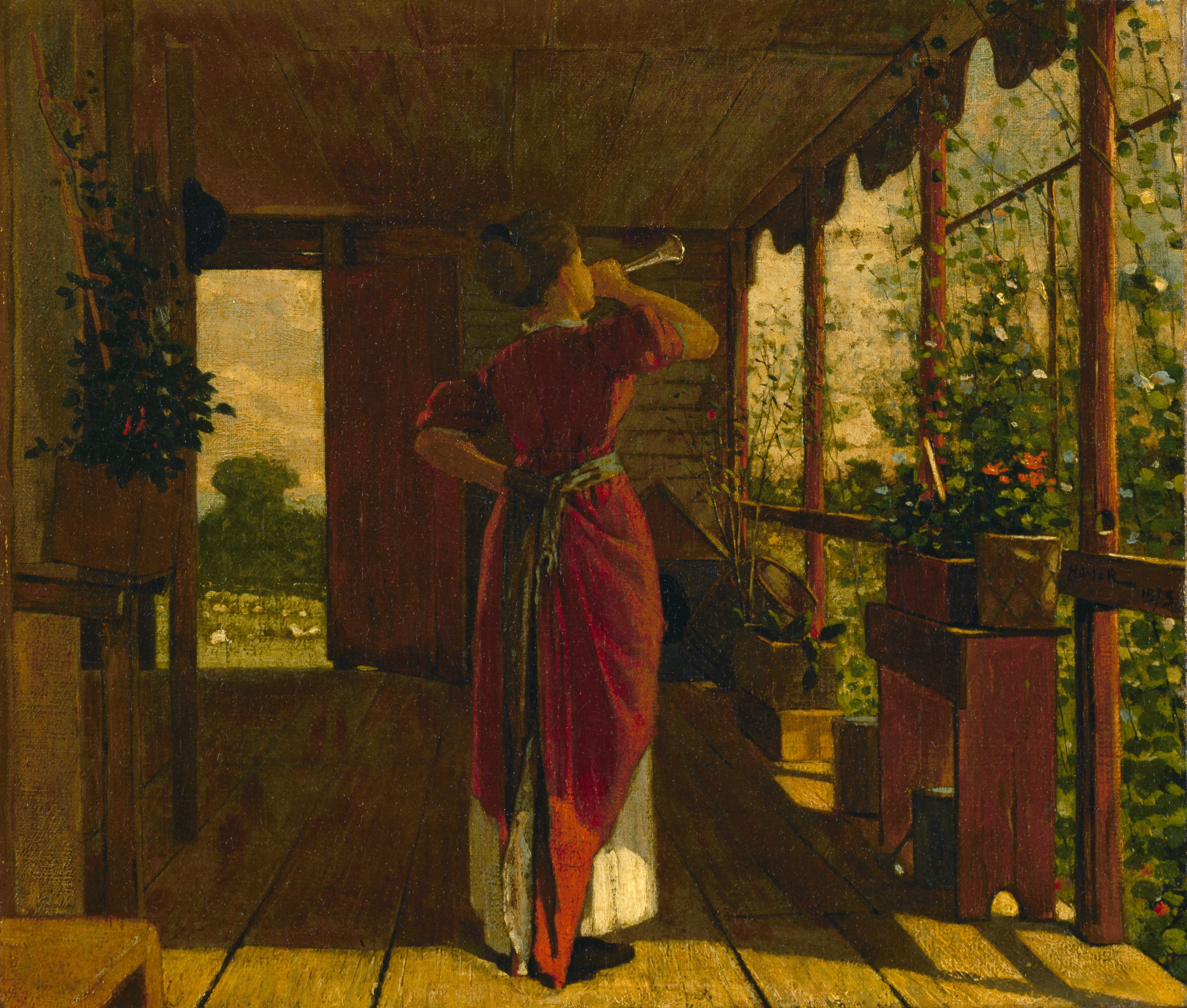
The Dinner Horn (1873) by Winslow Homer. Detroit Institute of Arts.

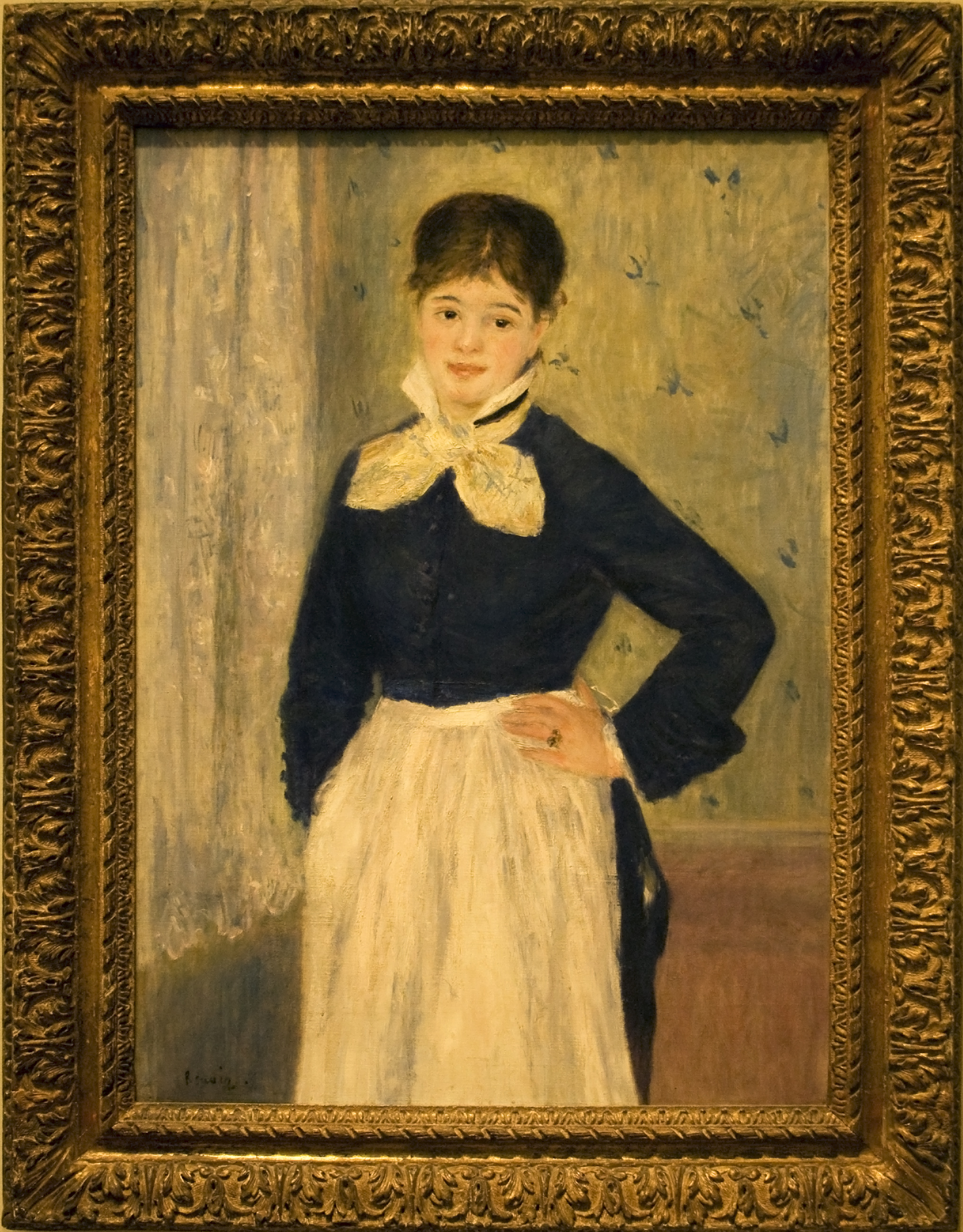
A Waitress at Duval's Restaurant (c. 1875) by Renoir. Bequest to the Metropolitan Museum of Art.

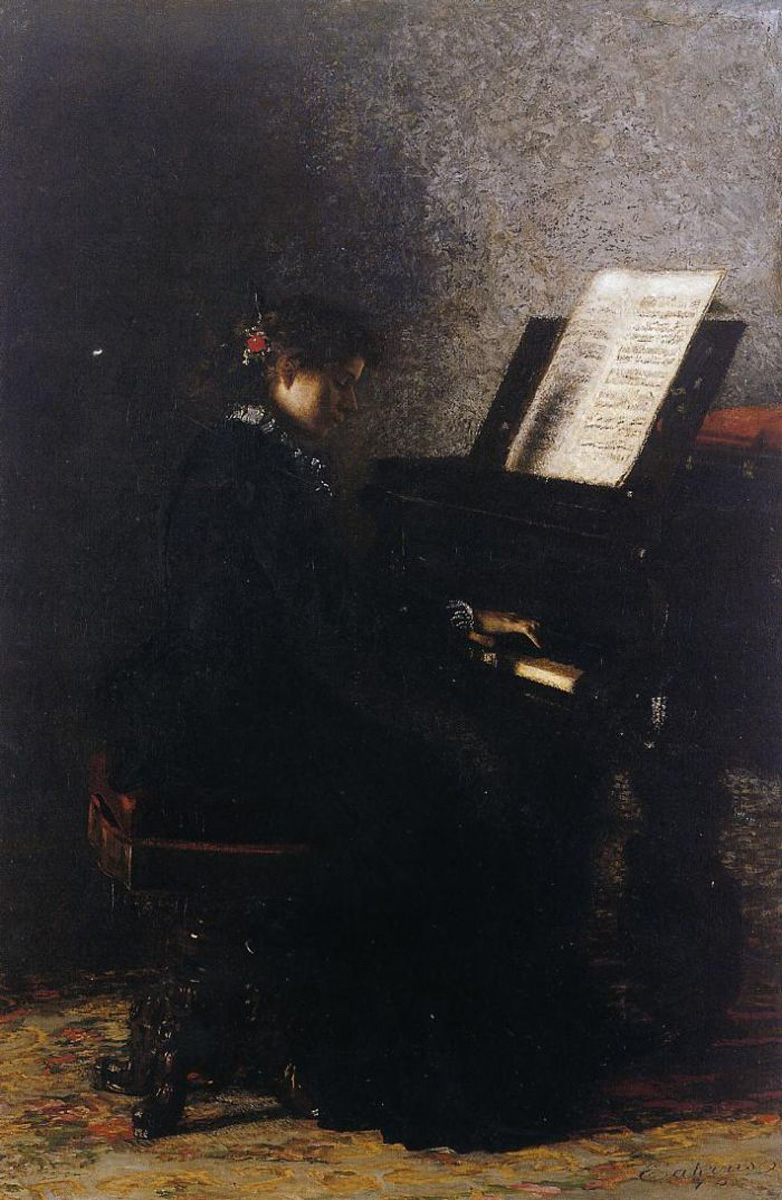
Elizabeth at the Piano (1875) by Thomas Eakins. Bequest to the Addison Gallery of American Art.

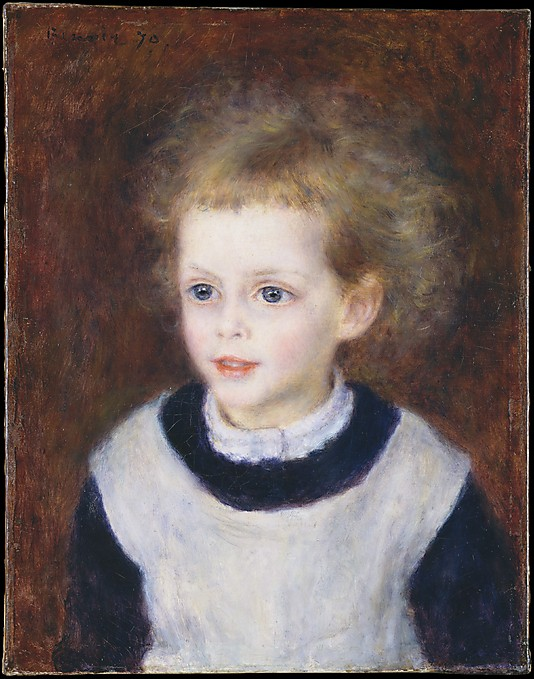
Portrait of Marguerite-Thérèse Berard (1879) by Renoir. Bequest to the Metropolitan Museum of Art.

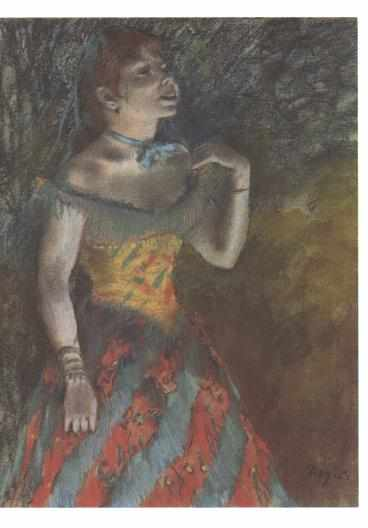
The Singer in Green (c.1884) by Degas. Bequest to the Metropolitan Museum of Art

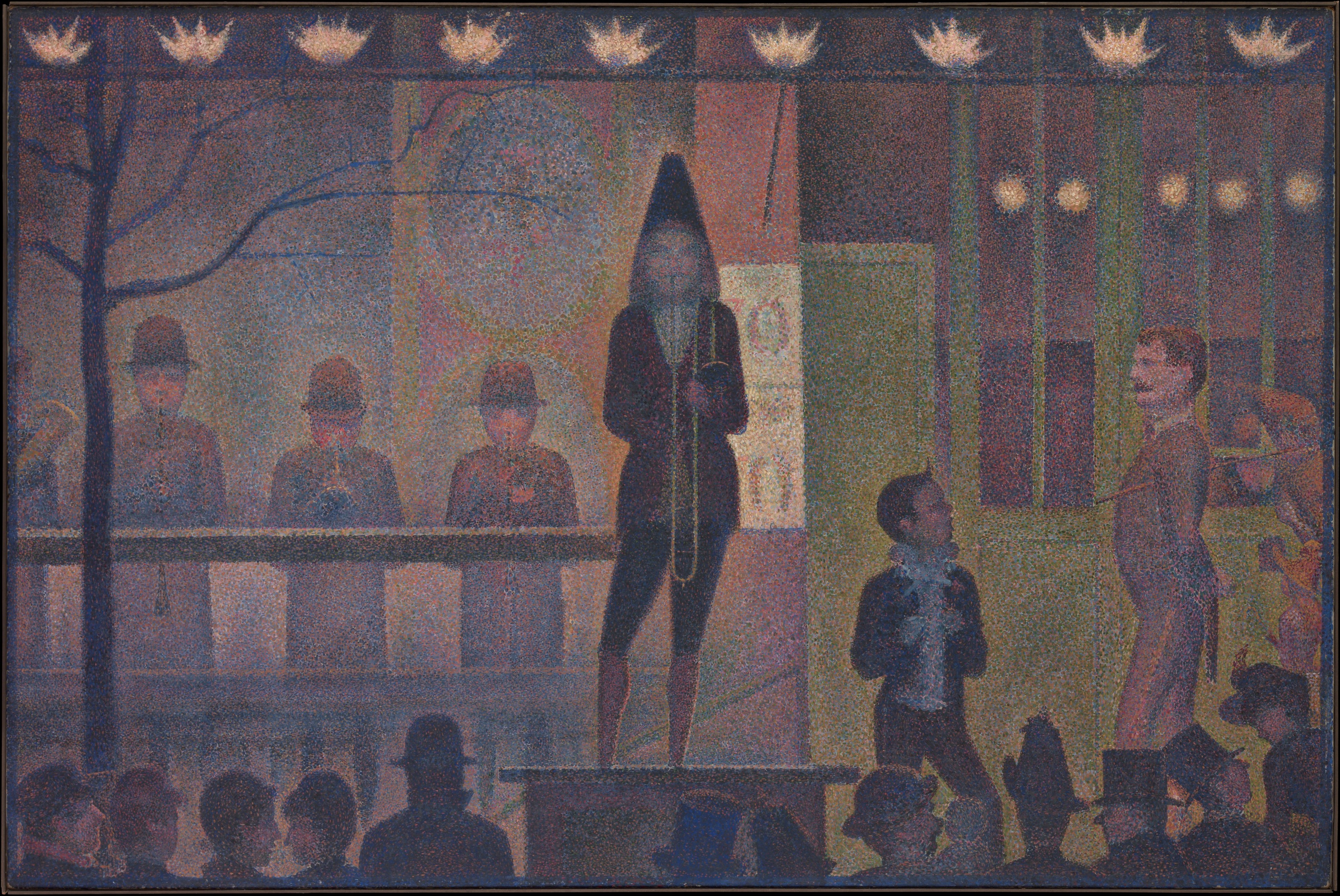
Circus Sideshow (Parade de cirque) (1887–88) by Georges Seurat. Bequest to the Metropolitan Museum of Art.

The Night Café (1888) by Vincent van Gogh. Bequest to Yale University Art Gallery.

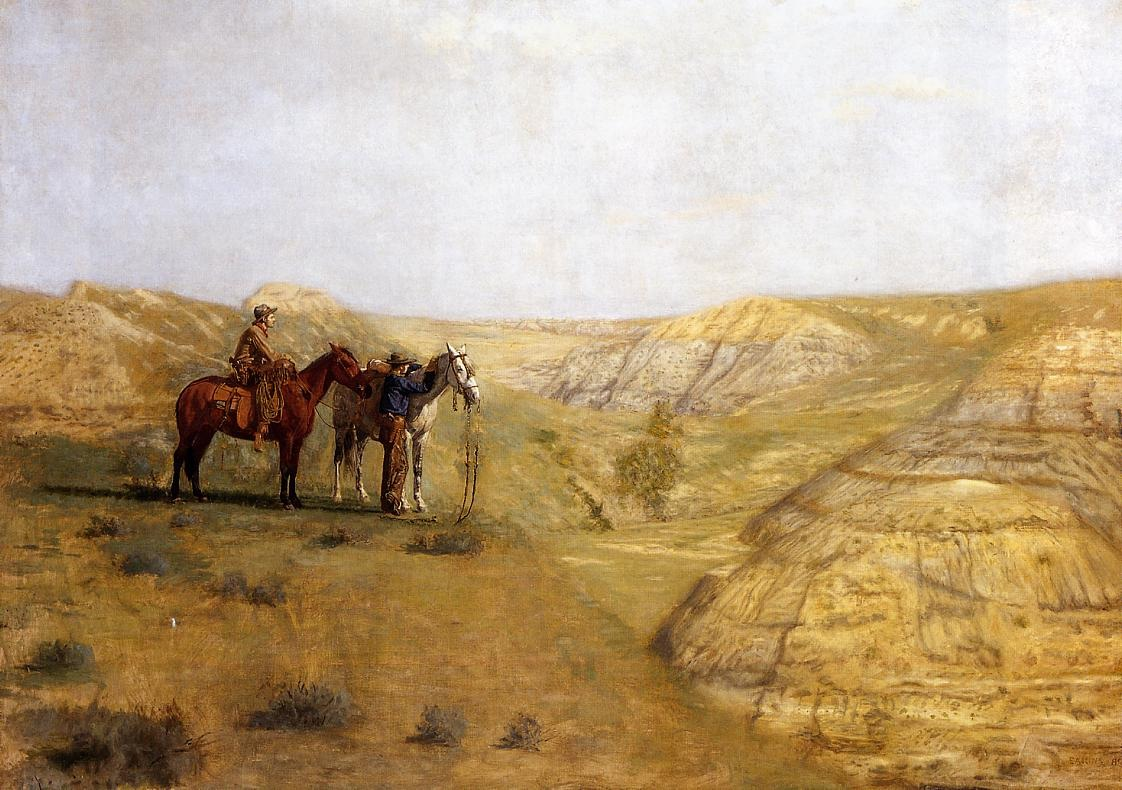
Cowboys in the Badlands (1888) by Thomas Eakins. Sold by Clark through Macbeth Gallery.

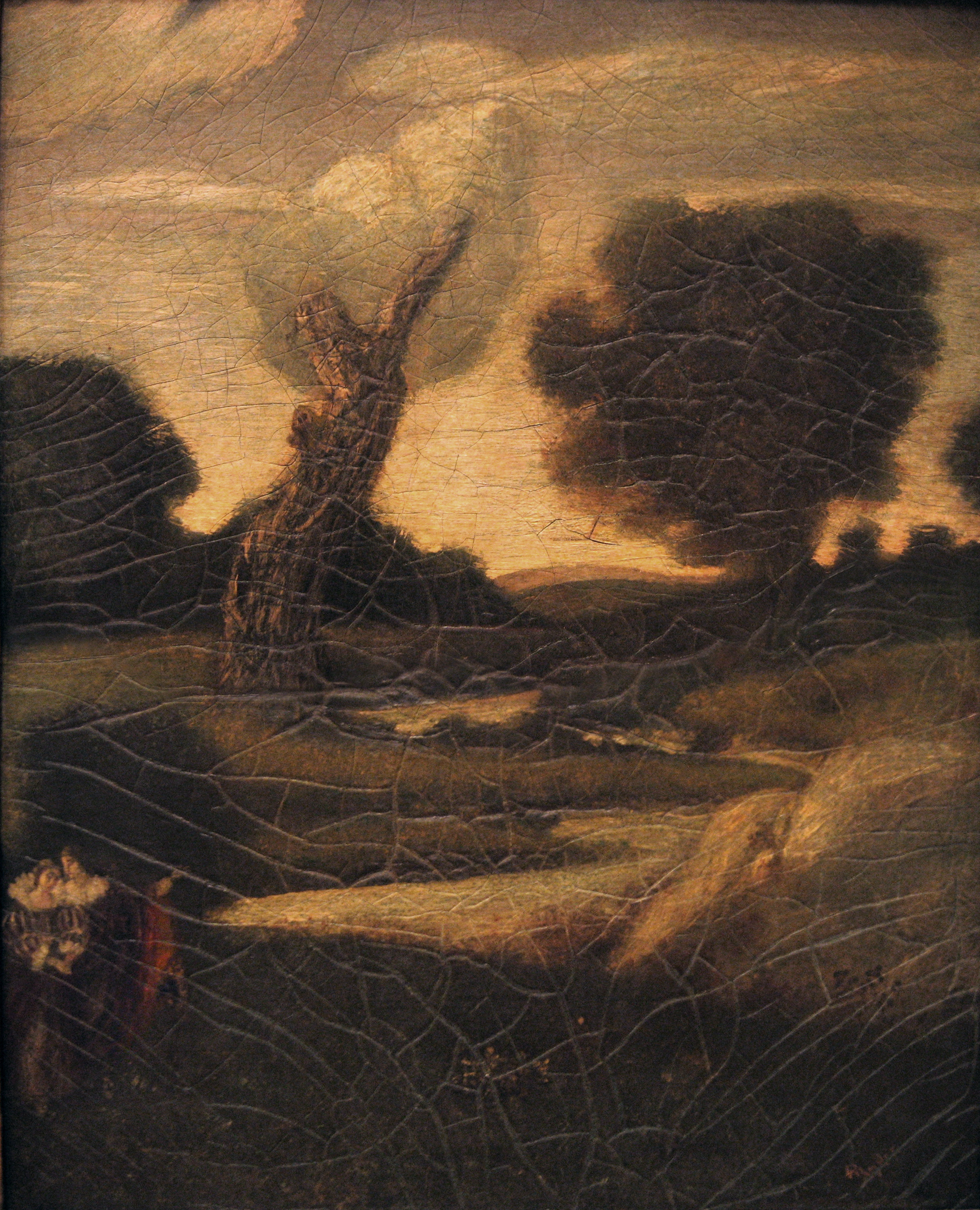
The Forest of Arden (c. 1888–1897) by Albert Pinkham Ryder. Bequest to the Metropolitan Museum of Art.

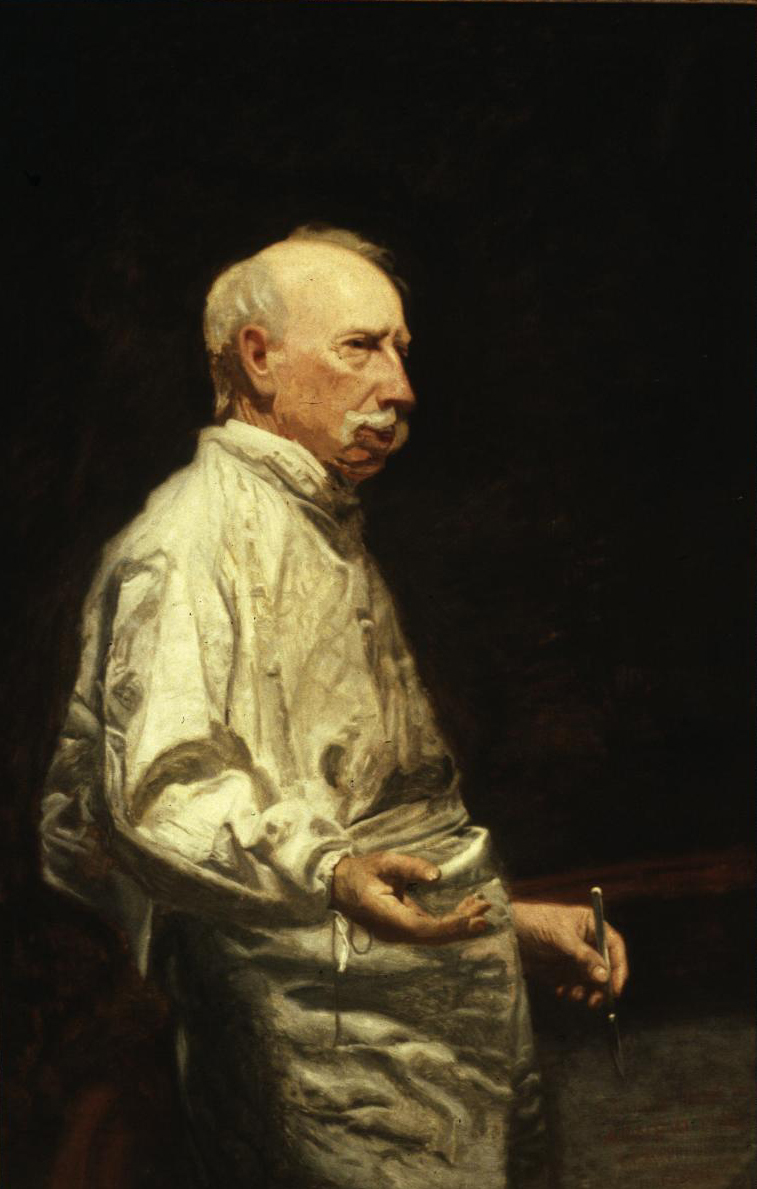
Portrait of Dr. D. Hayes Agnew (c. 1889) by Thomas Eakins. Bequest to Yale University Art Gallery.

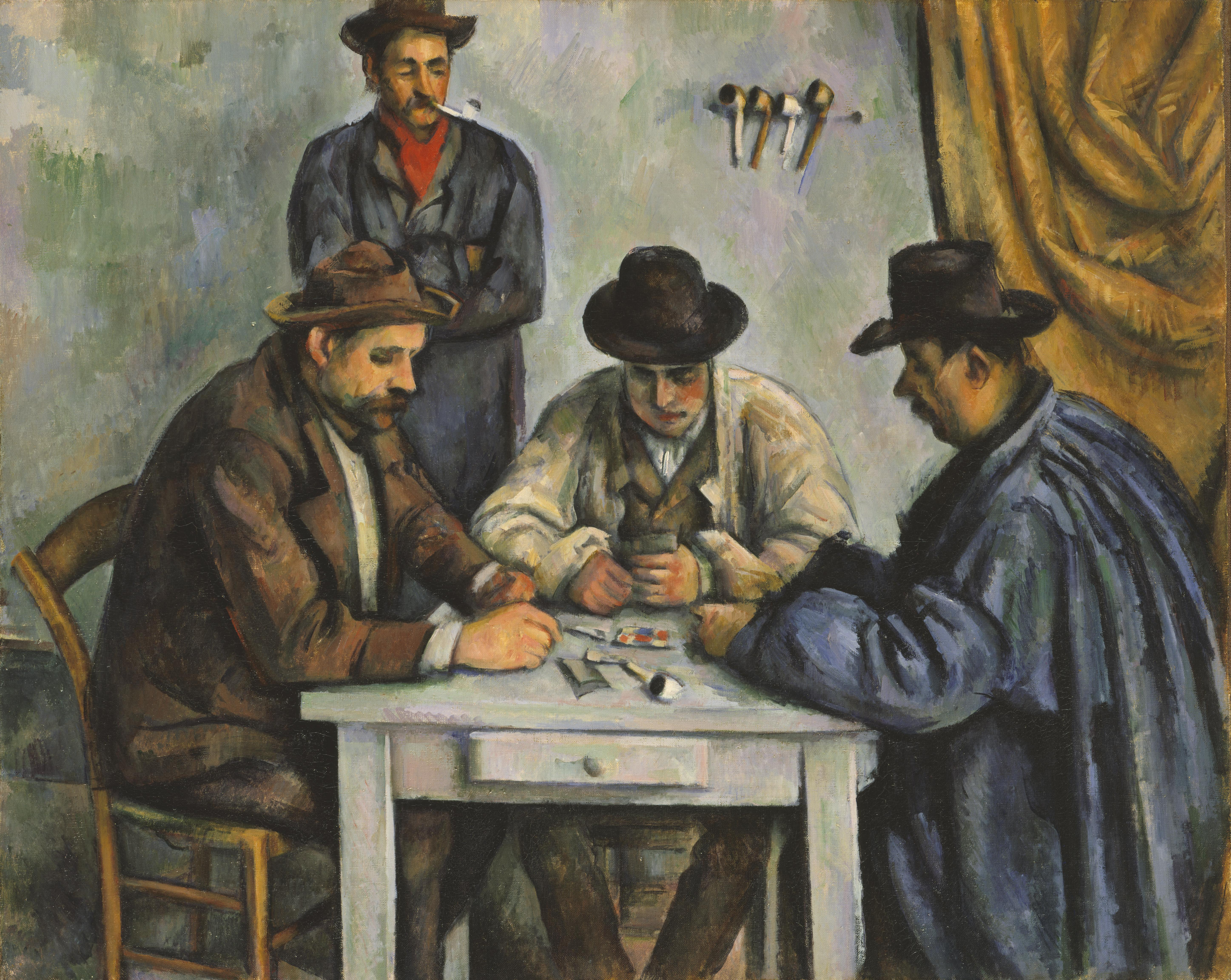
The Card Players (1890–92) by Cézanne. Bequest to the Metropolitan Museum of Art.

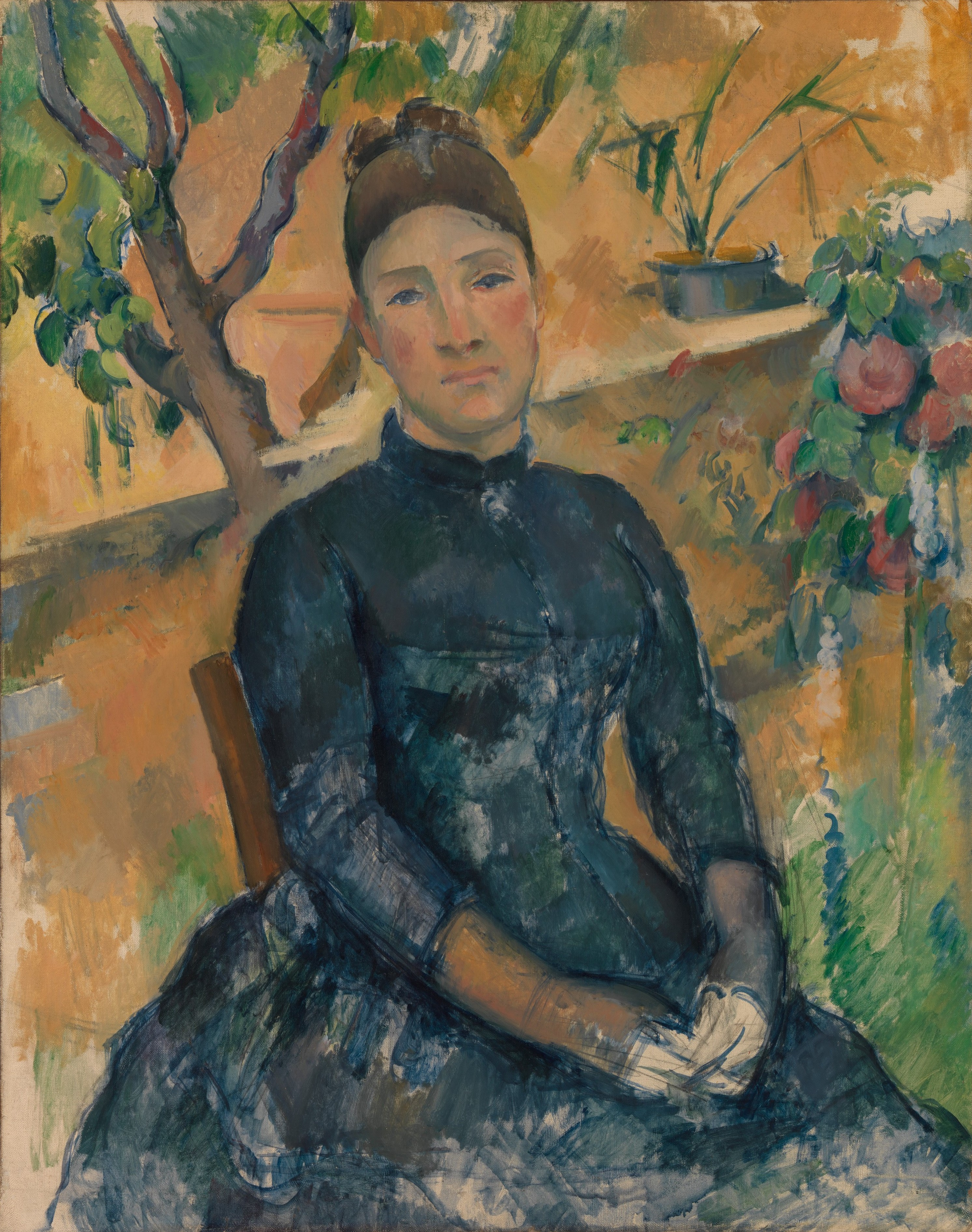
Portrait of Madame Cézanne (1891) by Cézanne. Bequest to the Metropolitan Museum of Art.

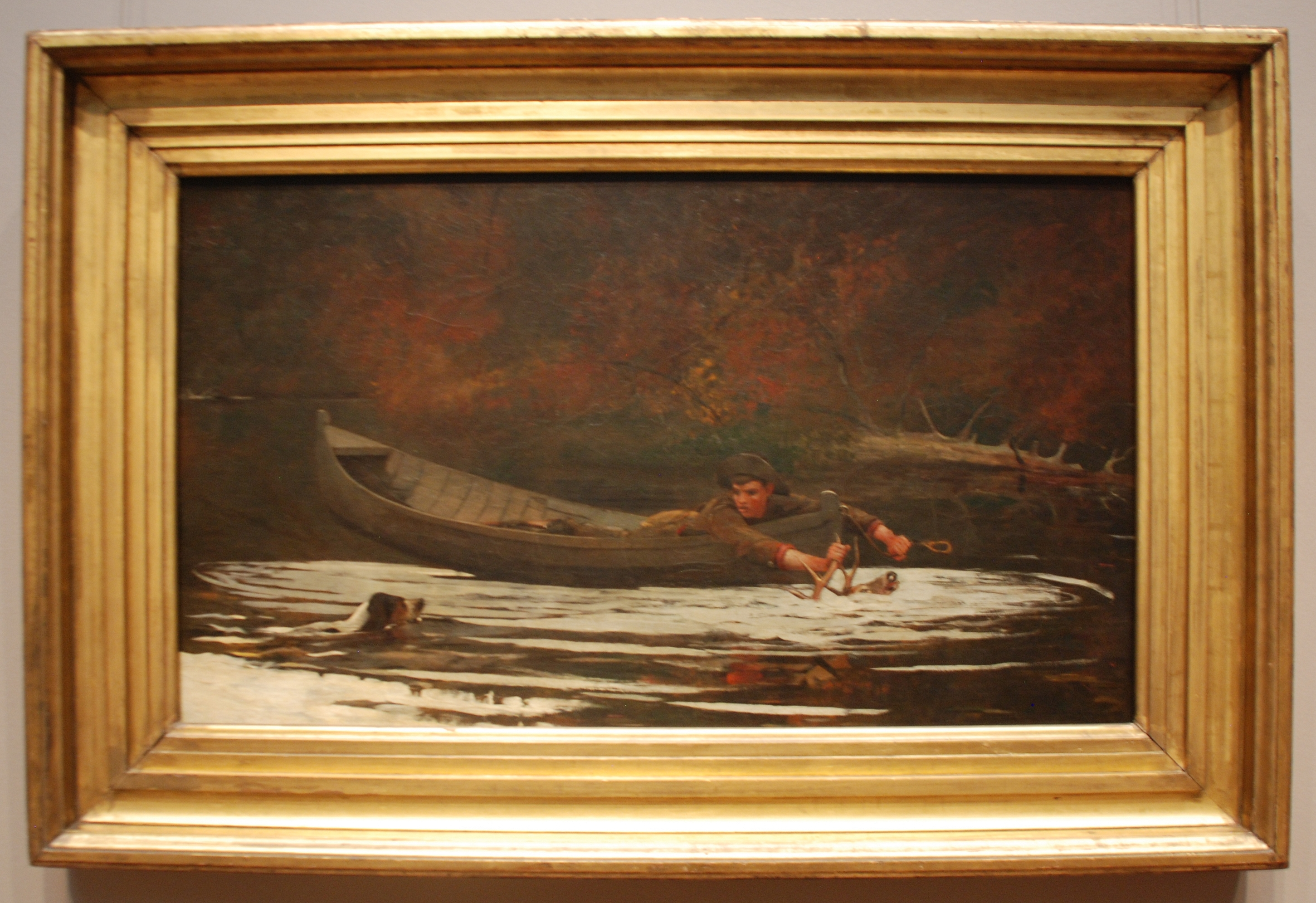
Hound and Hunter (1892) by Winslow Homer. 1947 gift to the National Gallery of Art.

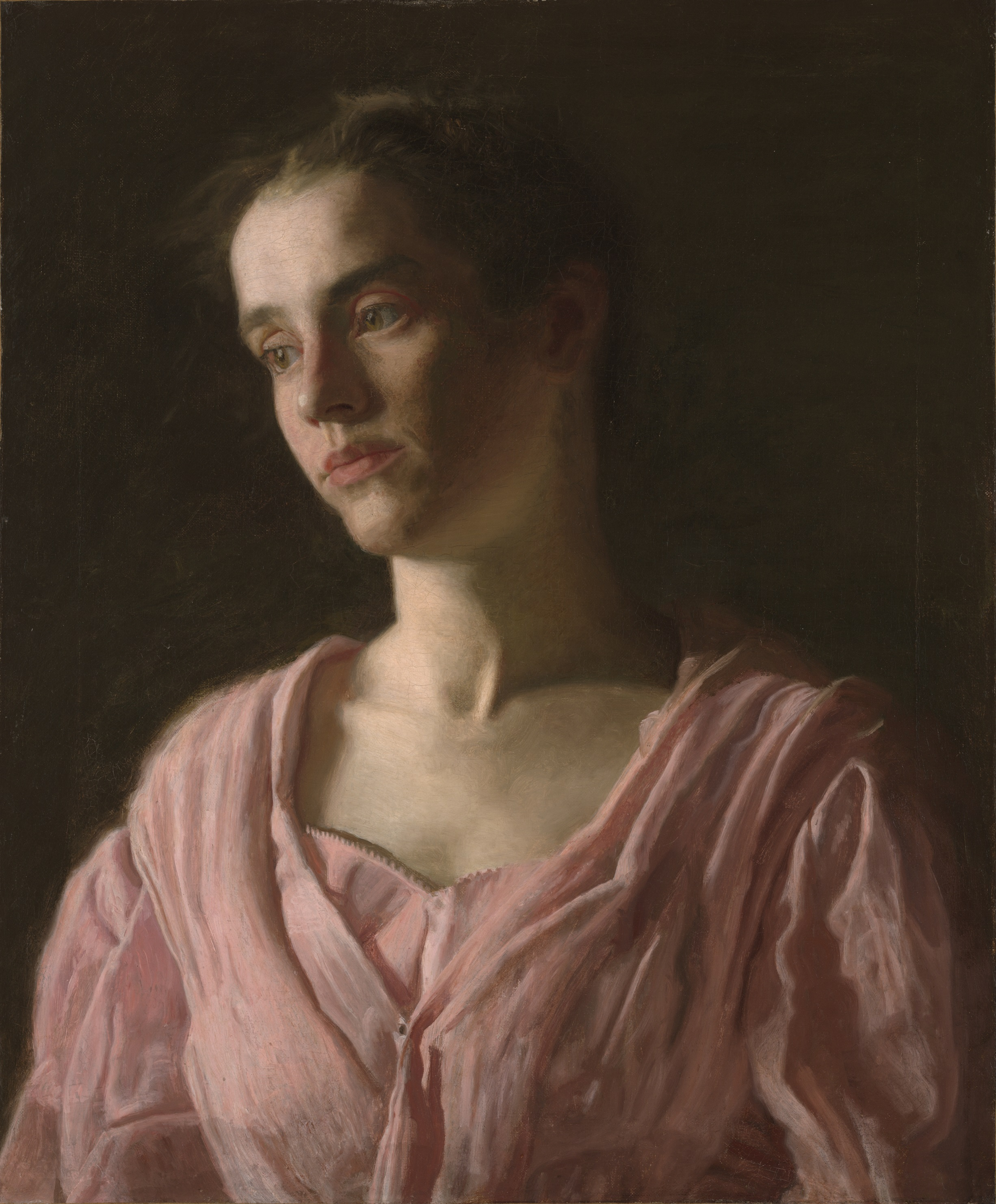
Portrait of Maud Cook (1895) by Thomas Eakins. Bequest to Yale University Art Gallery.

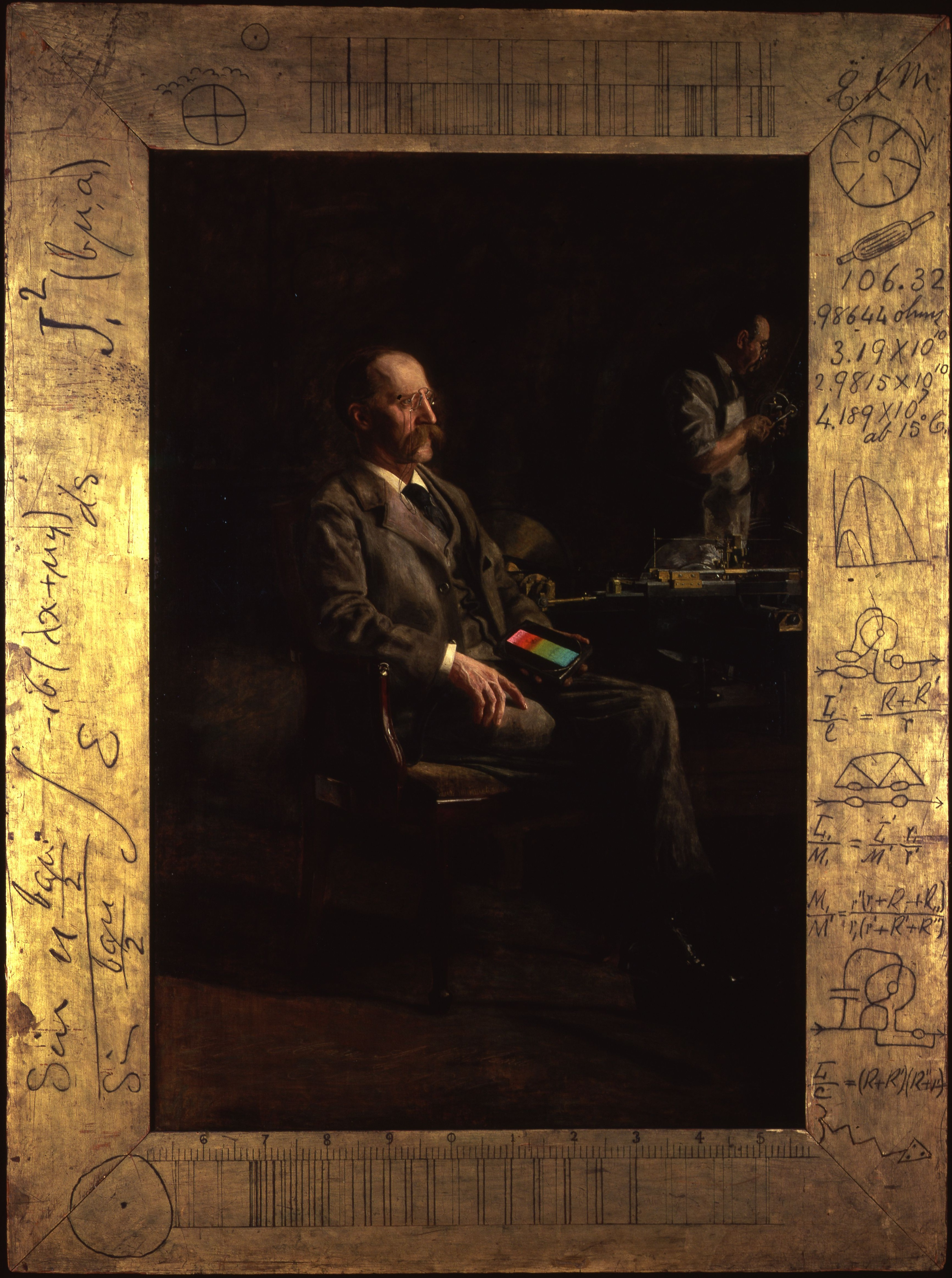
Portrait of Henry Augustus Rowland (1897) by Thomas Eakins. Bequest to the Addison Gallery of American Art.

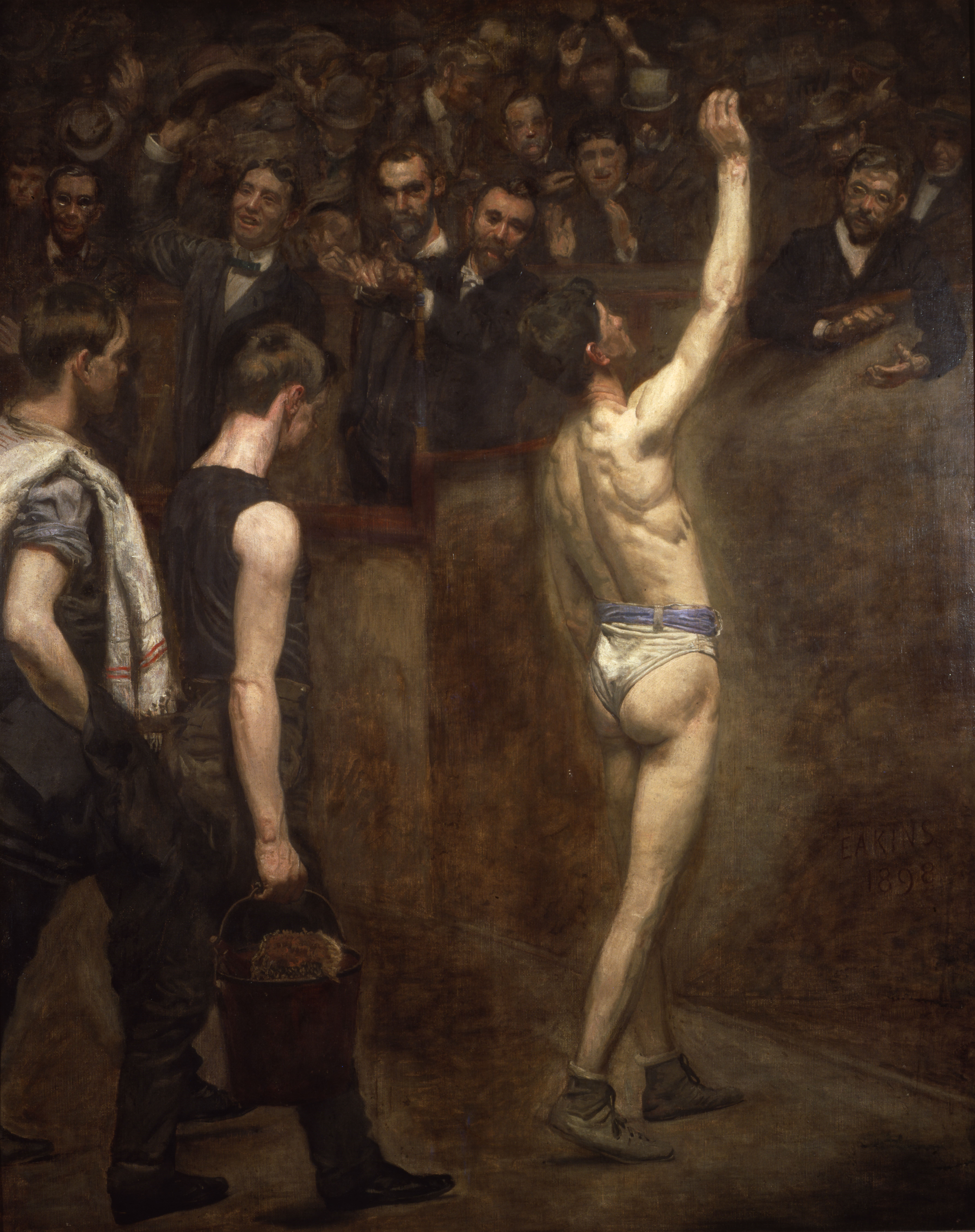
Salutat (1898) by Thomas Eakins. Bequest to the Addison Gallery of American Art.

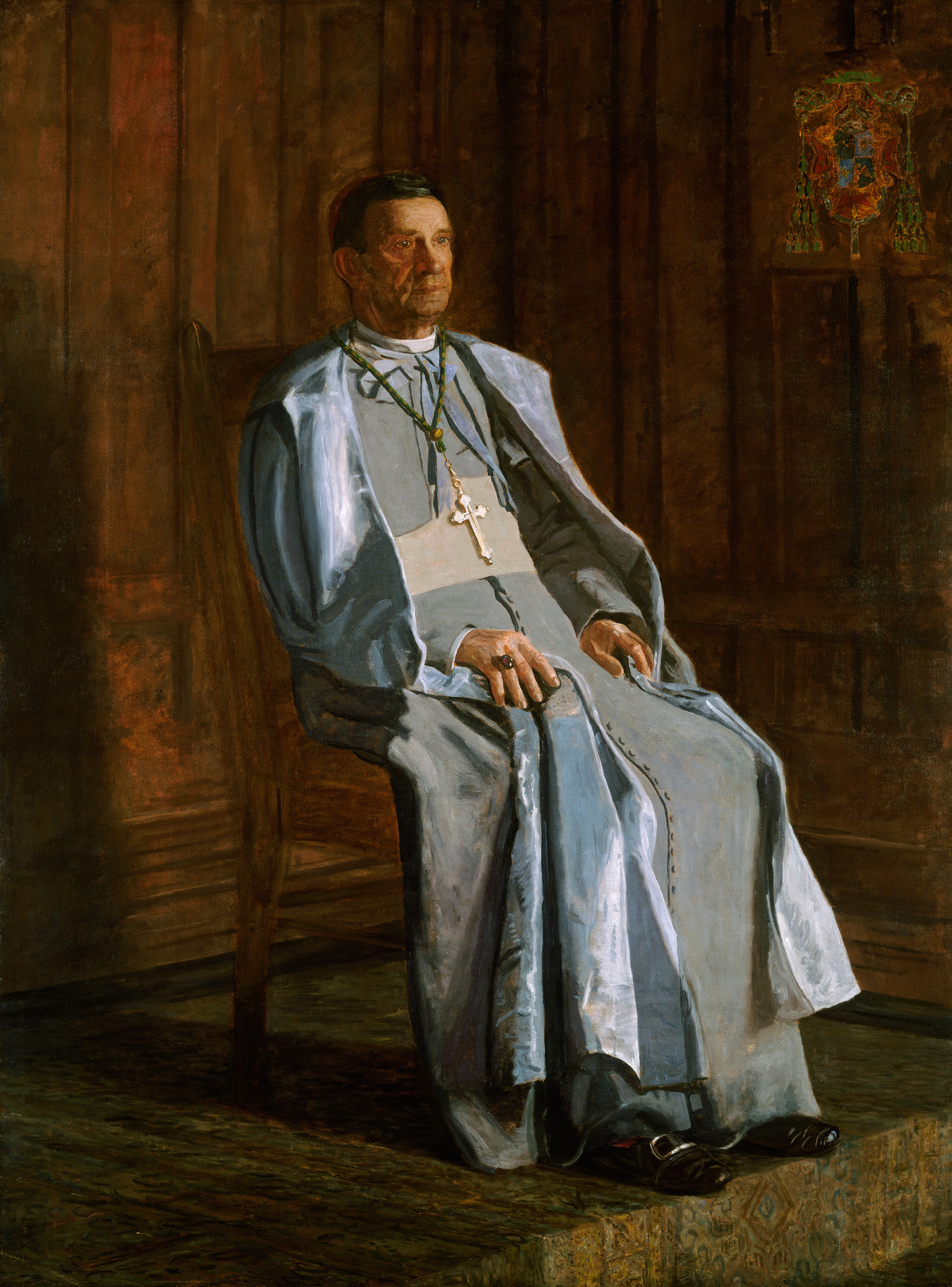
Archbishop Diomede Falconio (1905) by Thomas Eakins. 1946 gift to the National Gallery of Art.

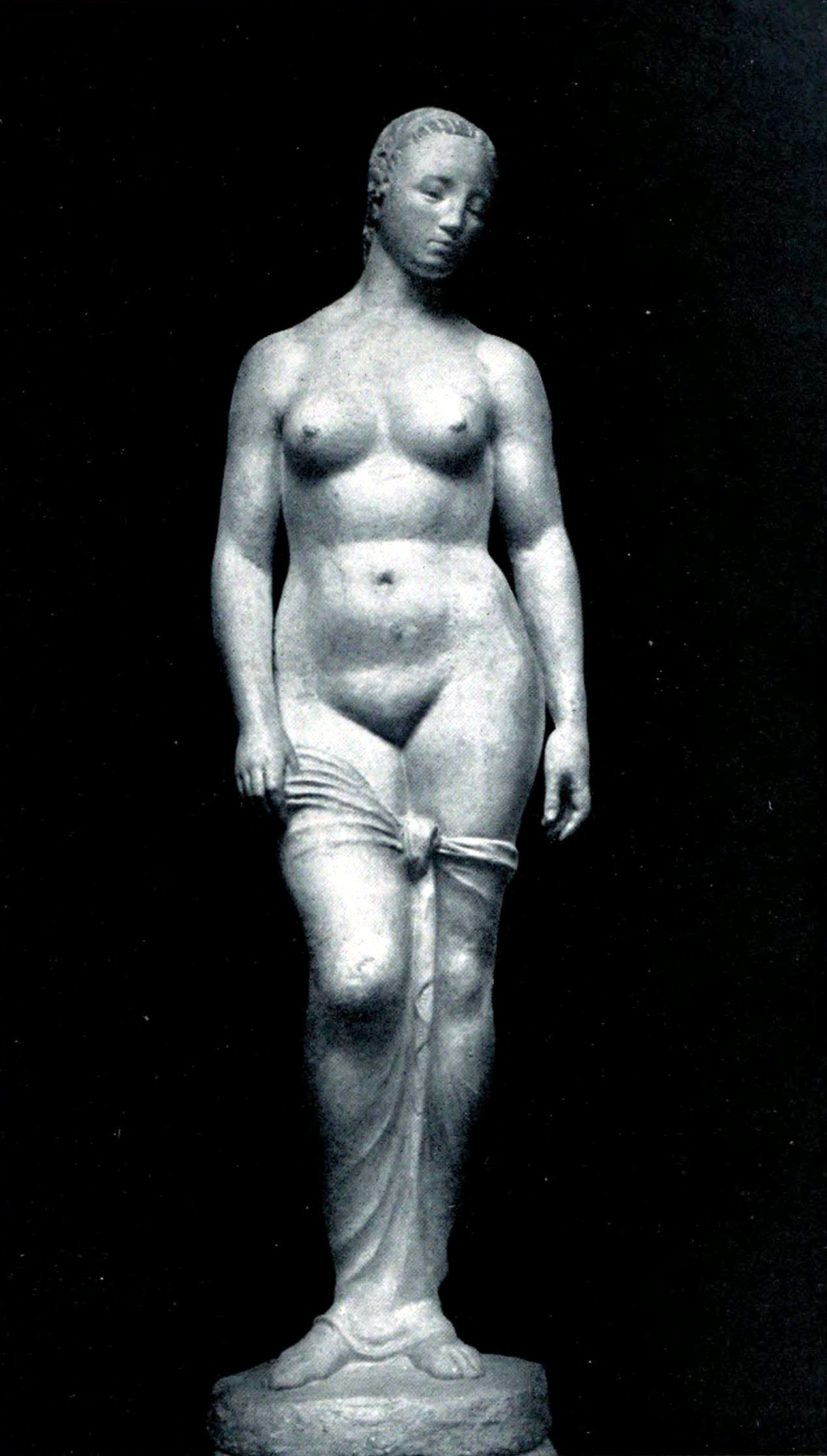
Standing Woman (1910) by Wilhelm Lehmbruck. Gift to the Museum of Modern Art.

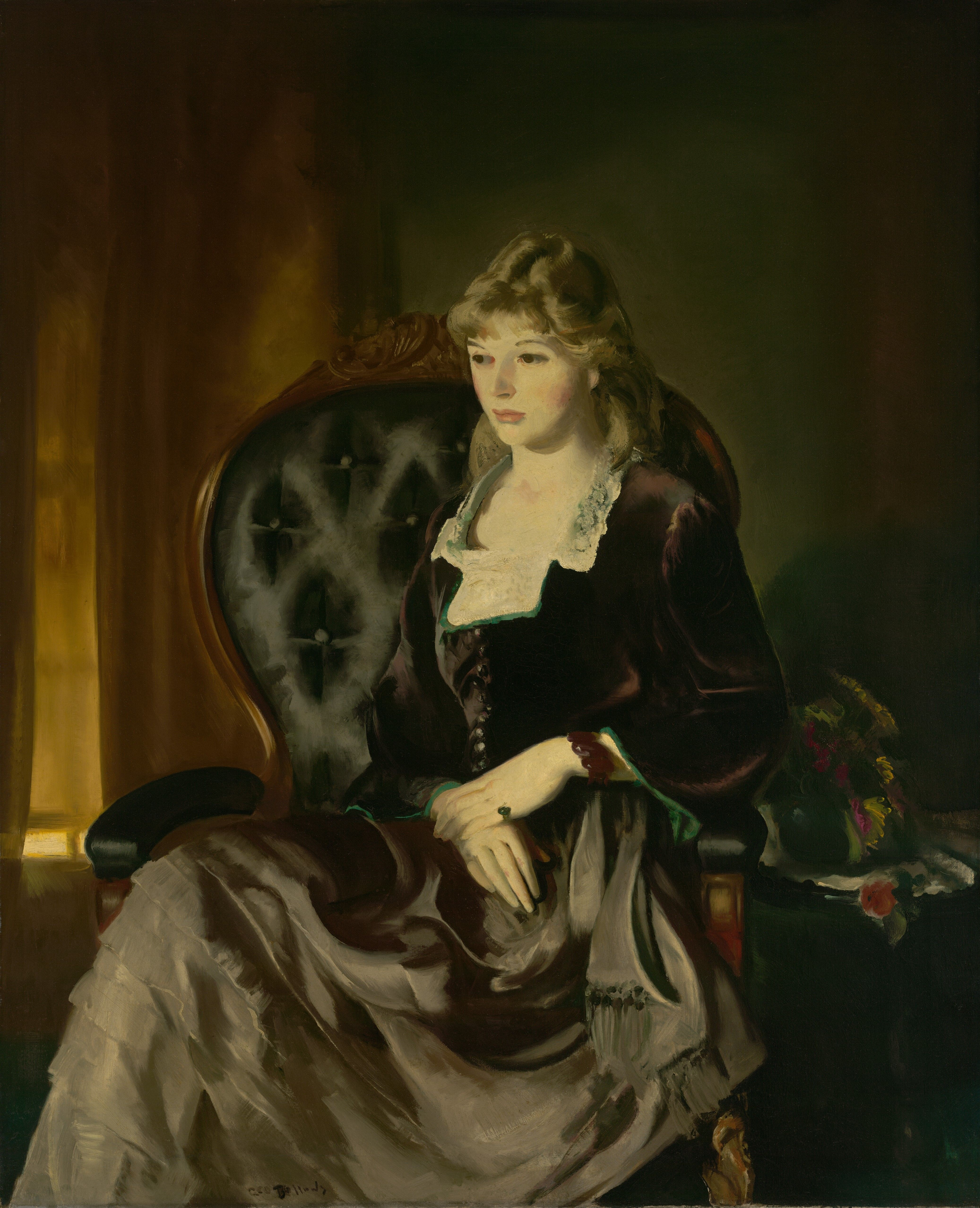
Katherine Rosen (1921) by George Wesley Bellows. Bequest to Yale University Art Gallery.
