= The Otesaga Hotel =

- U.S. Historic district – Contributing property
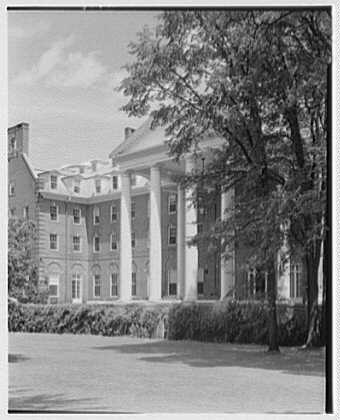
- The Otesaga Hotel in 1955

- Location within New York Location within the United States
- Location: Lake Street, Cooperstown, New York
- Coordinates: 42.704357°N 74.926790°W
- Built: ca. 1909
- Architectural style: Federal
- Part of: Cooperstown Historic District (ID9700937)

The Otesaga Hotel or Otesage Resort Hotel is a historic hotel located in the Village of Cooperstown, New York on Lake Street (NY-80). It was built in 1909 in the Federal style. The hotel is a contributing building to the Cooperstown Historic District on the Southern shore of Lake Otsego in Cooperstown. It has been selected by the National Trust for Historic Preservation as a member of Historic Hotels of America.

The hotel is open year-round. It has 135 rooms and occupies 700 feet of Otsego Lake shore. The Otesaga also has two restaurants and features an 18-hole golf course which was also established in 1909.

The hotel's designer was architect Percy Griffin and it was built by Stephen Carlton Clark and his brother Edward Severin Clark. The hotel's architectural style has been said to be both Federal and Neo-Georgian. The front of the building has a portico supported by eight 30-foot wooden columns. The kitchen was originally furnished in 1909 by Duparquet, Huot & Moneuse. The hotel has a reputation for being haunted and was featured in an episode of the television show, "Ghost Hunters" which originally aired on August 25, 2010.
