= Edward Clarke =

Edward Clarke may refer to:

- Edward Clarke (MP for Hythe) (died 1628), English MP for Hythe, 1625
- Edward Clarke (of Chipley), 16th–17th century member of parliament for Taunton, Somerset, England
- Edward Clarke (Lord Mayor of London) (died 1703)
- Edward Clarke (MP for Norwich) (died 1723), English politician, MP for Norwich, 1701–1702
- Edward Clarke (1650–1710), English politician, MP for Taunton, 1690–1710
- Edward Clarke (author) (1730–1786), English cleric
- Edward Daniel Clarke (1769–1822), English naturalist, mineralogist and traveller
- Edward Clarke (1770–1826), British politician, MP for Wootton Bassett, 1796–1802
- Edward Goodman Clarke (fl. 1812), English physician
- Edward Frederick Clarke (1850–1905), Canadian journalist and politician
- Edward Clarke (footballer) (1871–?), English footballer
- Edward Denman Clarke (1898–1966), World War I flying ace
- Edward Hammond Clarke (1820–1877), American physician and author of Sex in Education; or, A Fair Chance for the Girls
- Sir Edward Clarke (barrister) (1841–1931), British lawyer and politician, Solicitor-General for England and Wales, 1886–1892
- Edward Bramwell Clarke (1874–1934), educator in Meiji period Japan
- Edward Clarke (pentathlete) (1888–1982), British modern pentathlete
- Edward Marmaduke Clarke (fl. 1830–1850), Irish scientific instrument maker
- Edward Young Clarke (1877–?), Imperial Wizard pro tempore of the Ku Klux Klan
- Edward H. Clarke (1939–2013), American economist, of Vickrey–Clarke–Groves auction
- Edward de Courcy Clarke (1880–1956), teacher, researcher and field geologist
- Edward Clarke (sprinter), winner of the 1997 4 × 400 meter relay at the NCAA Division I Outdoor Track and Field Championships
- "Fast" Eddie Clarke (Edward Allan Clarke, 1950–2018), British guitarist

== See also ==
- Edward Clark (disambiguation)
- Edward Clerke, Dean of Cloyne, 1615–1640
- Eddie Clarke (footballer) (born 1998)
- Edmund M. Clarke (1945–2020), American computer scientist
