= Edward Clark =

Edward or Ed Clark may refer to:

== Artists and entertainers ==
- Edward Clark (actor) (1878–1954), Russian-born American actor and songwriter
- Ed Clark (artist) (1926–2019), American abstract painter
- Edward Clark (conductor) (1888–1962), British conductor and BBC music producer
- Ed Clark (photographer) (1911–2000), Life magazine photographer

== Businessmen ==
- Edward Cabot Clark (1811–1882), American businessman, co-founder of the Singer Sewing Machine Company
- Edward Severin Clark (1870–1933), American businessman, grandson of Edward Cabot Clark
- Edward Walter Clark Jr. (1858–1946), American businessman, senior partner in the E. W. Clark & Co. investment house, son of Edward White Clark
- Edward Walter Clark III (1885–1939), investment banker, son of the above
- Edward White Clark (1828–1904), head of E. W. Clark & Co., a financial firm in Philadelphia, Pennsylvania

== Politicians ==
- Ed Clark (1930–2025), American politician, Libertarian presidential candidate in 1980
- Edward Clark (Australian politician) (1854–1933), Australian politician
- Edward Clark (governor) (1815–1880), American politician, Governor of Texas
- Edward Clark (Canadian politician) (born 1932), Canadian politician
- Edward A. Clark (1906–1992), United States Ambassador to Australia, 1965–1968
- Edward Henry Clark (1870–1932), New Zealand politician
- G. Edward Clark (1917–1984), American ambassador
- Eduardo Clark (1991), Mexican public official

== Sports ==
- Ed Clark (baseball) (Edmund C. Clark, 1863–1927), American baseball player
- Nobby Clark (cricketer) (Edward Winchester Clark, 1902–1982), English cricketer

== Others ==
- Edward Clark (architect) (1822–1902), American architect, Architect of the Capitol, 1865–1902
- Edward William Clark (born 1946), American Roman Catholic bishop
- Edward Winter Clark (1830–1913), American missionary in Nagaland, India

== See also ==
- Edward Clarke (disambiguation)
- Edwin Clark (disambiguation)
- Edgar E. Clark (1856–1930), American attorney, government and union official
- Edmund Clark, British photographer
- Edward Clark Carter (1878–1954), American educator
