= Ambrose L. Jordan =

American politician

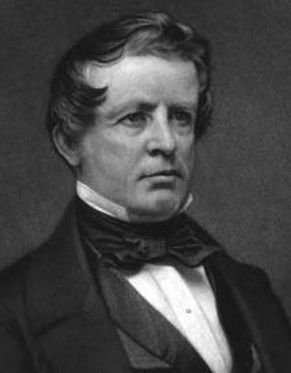
- From 1878's History of Otsego County, by Duane H. Hurd

New York State Attorney General
- In office 1848–1849
- Preceded by: John Van Buren
- Succeeded by: Levi S. Chatfield

Member of the New York State Senate
- In office 1826–1829
- Preceded by: Charles E. Dudley
- Succeeded by: William Dietz

Personal details
- Born: Ambrose Latting Jordan; May 5, 1789 Hillsdale, New York, U.S.
- Died: July 16, 1865 (aged 76)
- Spouse: Cornelia Caroline Philip (m. 1811)
- Relations: Alfred Corning Clark (grandson)

Ambrose Latting Jordan, (5 May 1789 – 16 July 1865) nicknamed Aquafortis, an obsolete word for nitric acid, was an American lawyer, newspaper editor, and politician. He defended tenant farmers in upstate New York who withheld rents in protest of their poverty and helped to set a precedent for personal land ownership in the western United States.

== Early life ==
Jordan was born on 5 May 1789, in southwest Hillsdale in Columbia County, New York. He was the son of William Jordan (1751–1833) and Ruth (née Ferris) Jordan (1755–1821). He was named after neighbor and fellow Baptist church member, Ambrose Latting, who "was known for his more militant leanings, joining the 1789 protest against the Van Rensselaer claim and leading the insurgency against the Livingstons in 1798 with Benjamin Birdsall, Jr."

Jordan was admitted to the bar in 1812, and practiced law in Cooperstown, New York.

== Career ==
From 1815 to 1818, he was Surrogate of Otsego County, and from 1818 to 1820, he served as the District Attorney of Otsego County. In 1820, he moved to Hudson, New York, and took over the Columbia Republican newspaper. From 1821 to 1827, he was Recorder of the City of Hudson.

In 1825, he was a member of the New York State Assembly representing Columbia County in the 48th New York State Legislature. From 1826 to 1829, he was a member of the New York State Senate, sitting in the 49th, 50th and 51st New York State Legislatures representing the 3rd District. He resigned his seat on January 7, 1829, the second day of the session of the 52nd New York State Legislature.

In February 1837, Jordan was the Whig candidate for U.S. Senator from New York, but was defeated by the incumbent Silas Wright, Jr.

=== Anti-Rent War trial ===
In 1845, Jordan was the leading counsel for the defense of some leaders of the Anti-Rent War, including Smith A. Boughton, at their trial for riot, conspiracy and robbery. John Van Buren, the state attorney general, personally conducted the accusation.

At the first trial the jury disagreed. At the re-trial, in September 1845, the two leading counsels started a fist-fight in open court, and were both sentenced by the presiding judge, Justice John W. Edmonds, to "solitary confinement in the county jail for 24 hours." Governor Silas Wright refused to accept Van Buren's resignation, and both counsels continued with the case after their release from jail. The defendant, Smith A. Boughton ("Big Thunder"), was sentenced to life imprisonment. At the next state election Governor Wright was defeated by John Young who had the support of the Anti-Renters, and Young pardoned Jordan's client who was released from jail.

=== Later life ===
In 1846, Jordan was a member of the New York State Constitutional Convention, and in 1847, as the candidate of the Whigs and Anti-Renters, he was the first New York State Attorney General elected by popular ballot under the provisions of the new Constitution, succeeding his antagonist of the Anti-Renters' trials. He served from January 1, 1848, to December 31, 1849. Afterwards he resumed his private practice.

== Personal life ==
In 1811, Jordan was married to Cornelia Caroline Philip (1796–1872), the daughter of Jacob H. Philip and Elbertie (née Fonda) Philip. Together, they were the parents of:

- Caroline Jordan (1815–1874), who married Edward Cabot Clark, a co-founder of the Singer Sewing Machine Company.

Jordan died on 16 July 1865, in New York City and was buried at the cemetery in Hudson, New York.

=== Descendants ===
Through his daughter Caroline, he was the maternal grandfather of Alfred Corning Clark and the great-grandfather of: Edward Severin Clark, F. Ambrose Clark, Robert Sterling Clark, Stephen Carlton Clark.

New York State Senate
Preceded by Charles E. Dudley	New York State Senate; Third District (Class 3); 1826–1829	Succeeded by William Dietz
Legal offices
Preceded by John Van Buren	New York State Attorney General; 1848–1849	Succeeded by Levi S. Chatfield
