= F. Ambrose Clark =

American heir and equestrian

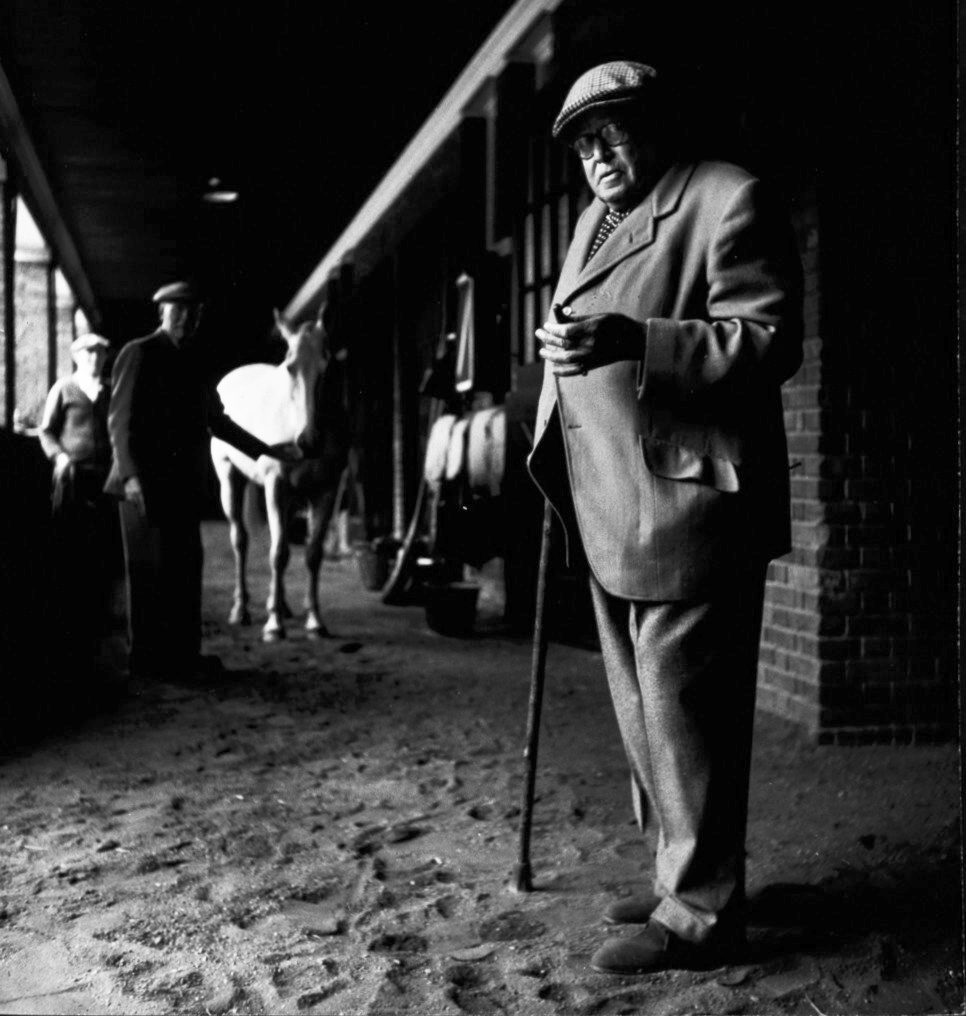
- Clark in October 1953
- Born: Frederick Ambrose Clark; August 1, 1880; Cooperstown, New York, U.S.
- Died: February 26, 1964 (aged 83); Westbury, New York, U.S.
- Spouses: Florence Lockwood Stokes (m. 1902; died 1950) Constance Augusta Miller (m. 1952–1964)
- Children: Ethel Stokes Clark
- Parent(s): Alfred Corning Clark; Elizabeth Scriven
- Relatives: Edward Severin Clark (brother); Robert Sterling Clark (brother); Stephen Carlton Clark (brother); Edward Cabot Clark (grandfather)

Frederick Ambrose Clark (August 1, 1880 – February 26, 1964) was an American heir and equestrian.

== Early life ==
"Brose" Clark was born on August 1, 1880, in Cooperstown, New York. He was the third son of Alfred Corning Clark (1844–1896) and Elizabeth (née Scriven) Clark (1848–1909). His siblings were Edward Severin Clark, Robert Sterling Clark, and Stephen Carlton Clark. He grew up in New York City and Cooperstown, New York. After his father's death in 1896, his mother remarried to Henry Codman Potter, the Episcopal bishop of New York from 1887 until his death in 1908.

His paternal grandfather was Singer Sewing Machine Company partner Edward Cabot Clark, who died in 1882, leaving an estate estimated between $25,000,000 (equivalent to $834,051,724 today) and $50,000,000 (equivalent to $1,668,103,448 today). Two year old Brose, his mother, and three brothers, all each inherited $250,000 (equivalent to $8,340,517 today). His paternal grandmother, Caroline (née Jordan) Clark, was the daughter of Ambrose L. Jordan, a New York State Senator who served as the New York State Attorney General.

== Equestrian interests ==
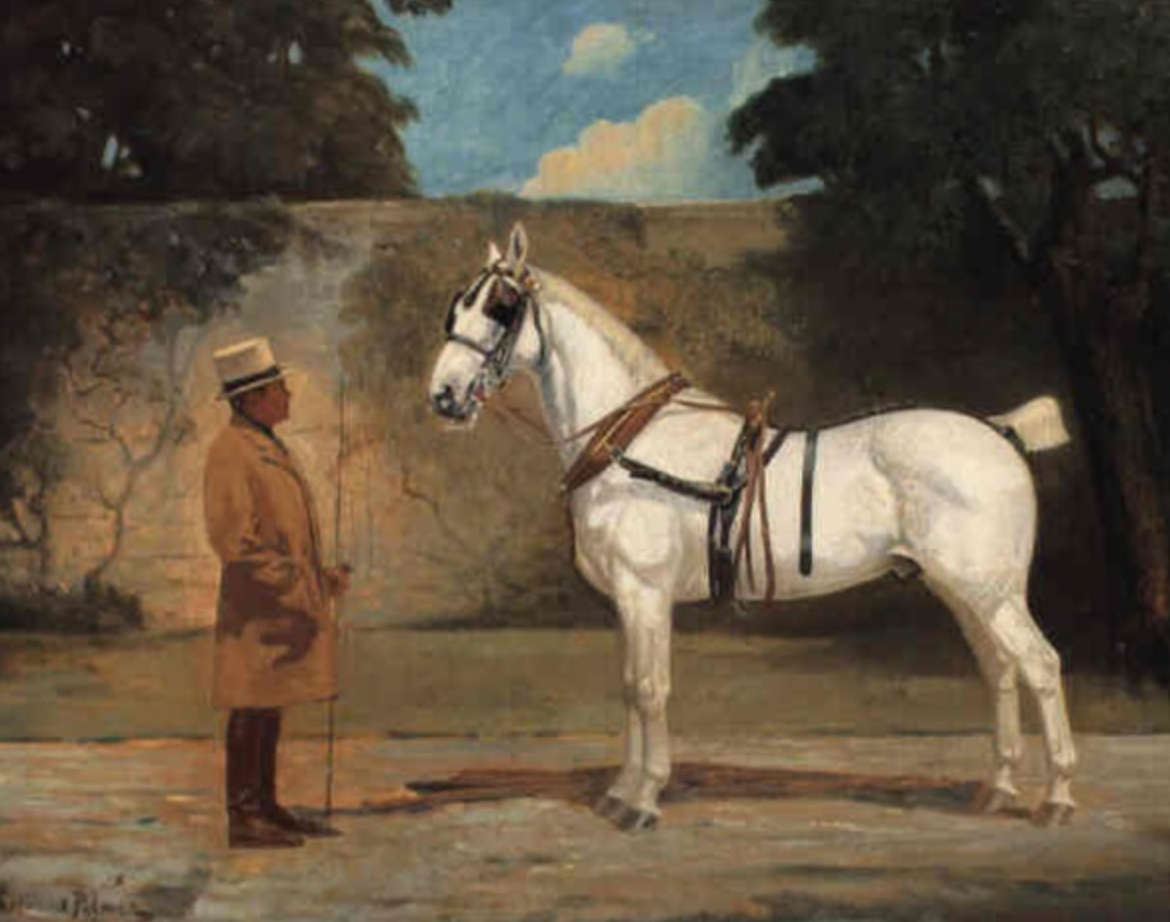
Ambrose Clark and favourite coach horse. Portrait by Lynwood Palmer.

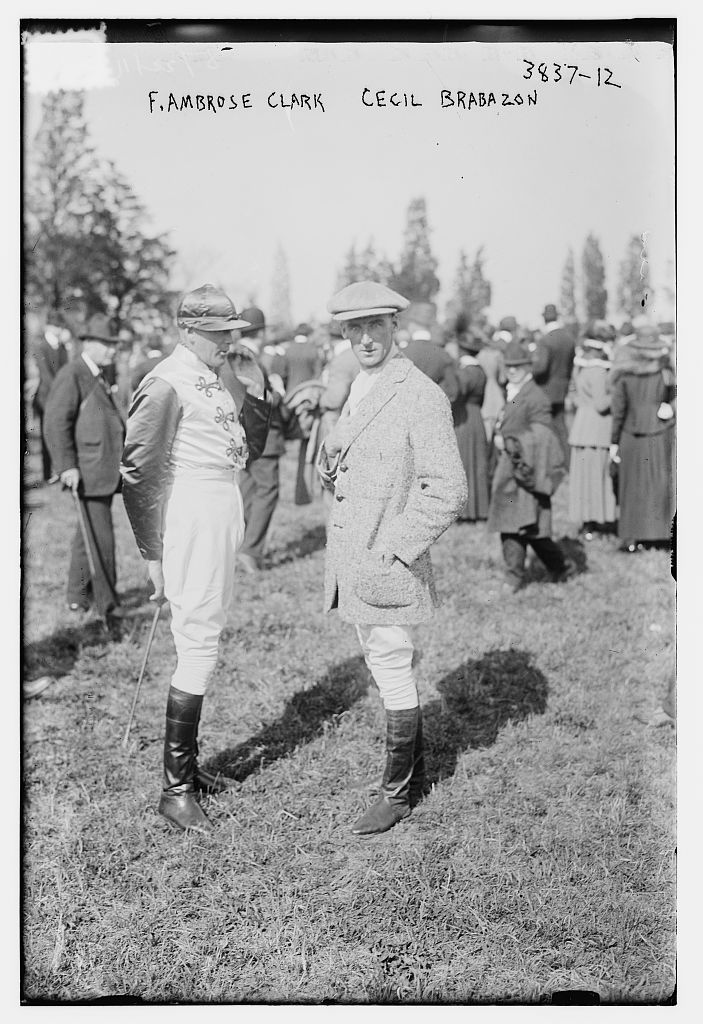
Frederick Ambrose Clark in 1916

Referred popularly and with affection as "Brose," he never attended college and "had no taste for business." He did, however, pour himself into his passion for all things equestrian. He was a gentleman rider who owned, bred and trained horses for steeplechase, polo, flat racing, driving, show jumping, and fox hunting. He was considered the quintessential equestrian, sportsman and was linked with horses throughout his life until his ailing health in 1963 marked the disbanding of his horse stables after 60 years of racing the light blue and yellow silks.

Clark looked to be a man who stepped right out of a 19th-century sporting print. He was often seen in a tweed English cap, waistcoat, breeches and tall boots throughout his life in person and in captured images. He was master of hounds for the Meadow Brook Hounds in the 1920s, which annually held a steeplechase race meeting on his property in Old Westbury, starting in 1919. Always the consummate horseman with a disdain for automobiles, famously Brose would not allow NBC radio to drive their equipment truck onto the estate to broadcast the races. Rather they had to use a team of horses to haul the equipment in.

In 1904, the then twenty-four year old Clark was painted by American painter Robert Henri. In 1958, he privately published a limited catalog of his sporting paintings: The F. Ambrose Clark Collection of Sporting Paintings which included select works by artists Sir Alfred Munnings and George Stubbs, among others.

=== Noted horses ===
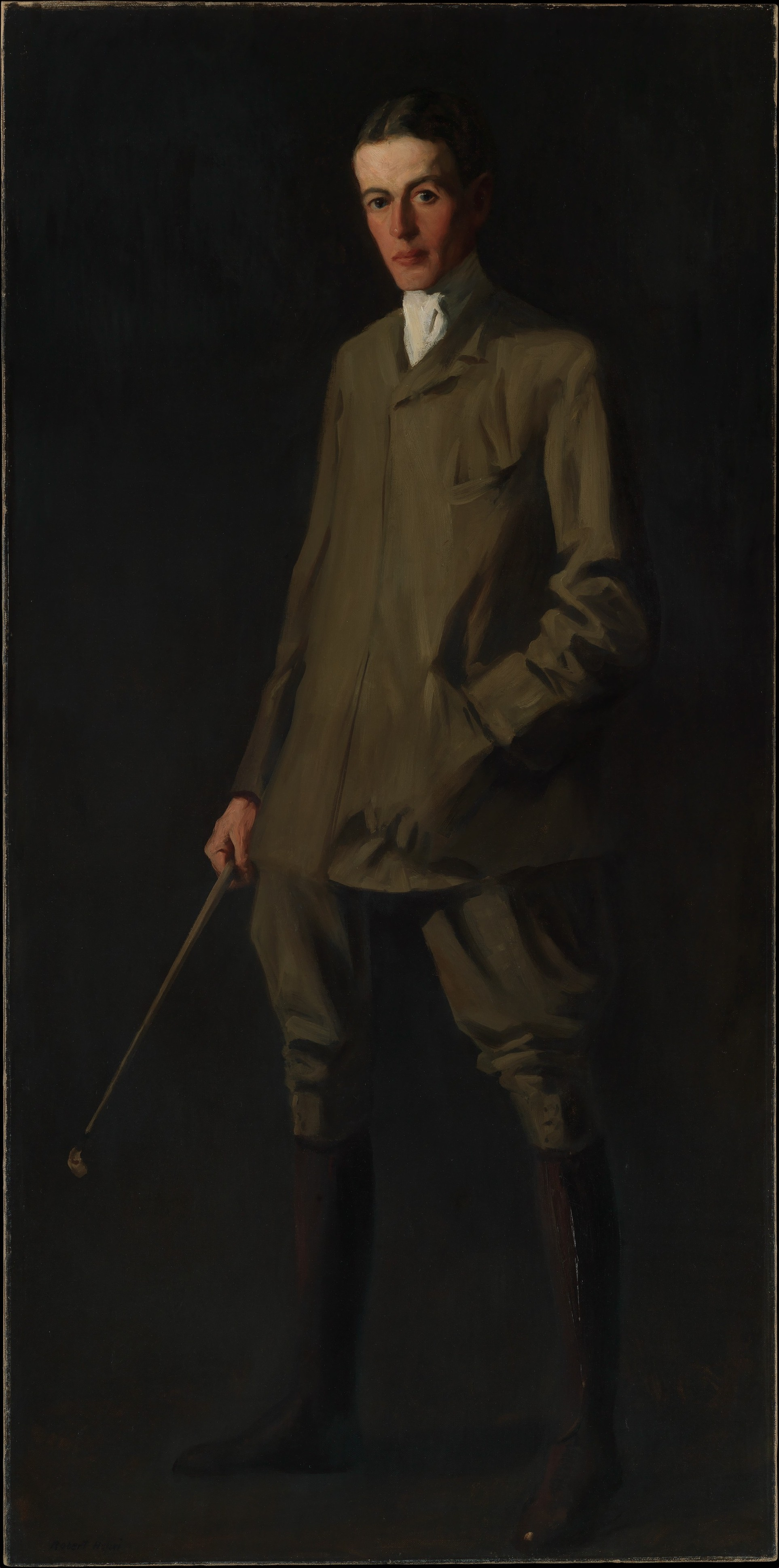
Portrait of F. Ambrose Clark (1904) by Robert Henri, Metropolitan Museum of Art.

The most famous horse under Brose was a gelding he sold to his wife Florence for $5.00 (one pound) at the time just prior to the 1933 English Grand National was Kellsboro Jack (Ireland). Trained by Ivor Anthony, the American-bred horse would become, at the time, just the 3rd American owned horse to win the grueling English steeplechase race at Aintree Racecourse. In the same race, Ambrose had entered Chadd's Ford who finished next to last. Kellsboro Jack's time of nine minutes thirty-eight seconds set a new record for the event.

Clark's horse Tea Maker, who raced from 1948 to 1953, and was bred by his wife, was inducted into the Aiken Thoroughbred Racing Hall of Fame and Museum on January 23, 1977. Tea Maker, at the age of 9, won the 1950 Vosburgh Stakes and American Legion Handicap and earned top honors as 1952's American Champion Sprint Horse.

Despite his various wins, Clark was unable to find success at the American Triple Crown races. In the 1928 Belmont Stakes, his horse, Broom Wisk, finished fourth of six runners, and in 1942, his Top Milk runner finished seventh of seven runners in the Belmont Stakes.

=== Properties ===
Clark owned various properties throughout the United States, including an apartment in The Dakota, estates in Cooperstown, Old Westbury on Long Island, in Aiken, South Carolina, and in Leicestershire, England. In addition, his wife owned an estate in northern Leon County, Florida, just north of Tallahassee.

A 5,000-acre (20 km^{2}) estate in Cooperstown, New York, known as Iroquois Farm, which remained in the Clark family after his death and was where Clark taught his nephews to be horsemen. The manor house at Iroquois Farm was razed in 1981 to make room for what was planned to be the relocation of the Clark Sports Center. Final changes resulted it being located in 1983 on what was the training track of Iroquois Farm.

A 400-acre (1.6 km^{2}) estate in Old Westbury on Long Island, known as Broad Hollow. Upon his death, Broad Hollow was donated to the State and became the State University of New York at Old Westbury. Its main sports venue, the Physical Education and Recreation Center, was renamed for Clark in 1988. The Clark Center is the home of the Old Westbury basketball programs and the Nassau County men's high school basketball championships.

An apartment in The Dakota, a luxury apartment building in Manhattan built by his grandfather. Between 1902 and 1904, he developed some buildings in the neighboring West 73rd–74th Street Historic District.

A sprawling estate in the Aiken Winter Colony acquired in 1929, known as Habersham House, that was built in 1927 for Kenneth Schley (Master of the Essex Hunt). The home was renamed Kellsboro after the Grand National victory and upon his death, went to Clark's nephew George H. "Pete" Bostwick.

A seasonal residence in England at Melton Mowbray, Leicestershire, the spiritual home of English fox-hunting. While in England, he rode with the Prince of Wales, who later became the Duke of Windsor, and who often was his house guest.

In addition, his first wife owned Foshalee Plantation, a 11,456-acre (46.36 km^{2}) quail hunting property in northern Leon County, Florida, just north of Tallahassee from 1938 until 1949.

== Personal life ==
In 1902, he was married to Florence Lockwood Stokes (1875–1950) at Orienta Point in Mamaroneck by Bishop Potter, who himself was married shortly thereafter to Clark's widowed mother. Florence was described as "a model sportswoman" for her zest and attitude. She was the daughter of Henry Bolter Stokes, president of the Manhattan Life Insurance Company, and Sophia Isaacs (née Lockwood) Stokes. Her sister was Marie Lillian Stokes, the wife of Albert Carlton Bostwick with whom Marie had five children. Together, Florence and Brose were the parents of one child, who predeceased both Florence and Brose:

- Ethel Stokes Clark (1910–1942), who suffered from "a disorder that handicapped her mentally and physically".

His wife died on October 2, 1950, at 7 East 77th Street, their New York City residence at the time. On November 9, 1952, he remarried to Constance Augusta (née Davies) Miller (1891–1981) at the home of his friend, Ogden Phipps, who was also the husband of his niece, Lillian Bostwick Phipps. Constance was the widow of Geoffrey Miller and the daughter of Frederick A. Davies of London, England.

He died on February 26, 1964, in Westbury on Long Island. He had two funerals, the first at the Protestant Episcopal Church of the Advent in Westbury, and the second at Christ Church in Cooperstown, before his burial beside Kellsboro Jack on a hillside just outside the village of Cooperstown. The bulk of his financial estate remained with the family trusts, The Clark Estates and Scriven Foundation. His widow survived him by almost seventeen years and eventually died on December 20, 1981, in Marylebone, London, England.

=== Legacy ===
Today the F. Ambrose Clark Award is the highest honor given in Steeplechase by the National Steeplechase Association. It is given to "individuals who have done the most to promote, improve, and encourage the growth and welfare of steeplechasing."

His significant collection of tack and historic carriage was put into The Carriage and Harness Museum of Cooperstown, N.Y. held in the Clark's Elk Street stables, which closed with the sale of the collection at auction September 8–9, 1978. Some of the tack was purchased on behalf of the Rockefeller family to furnish a carriage house being opened as a museum as part of the Kykuit estate in Pocantico Hills. The harness is seen there today, with the brass monograms changed from the original "C" to "R". The Elk Street stables are extant, now used as offices for Mary Imogene Bassett Hospital.

The rare books room at the National Sporting Library & Museum in Middleburg, Virginia, is named in his honor.
