= Lorentz Severin Skougaard =

Norwegian tenor

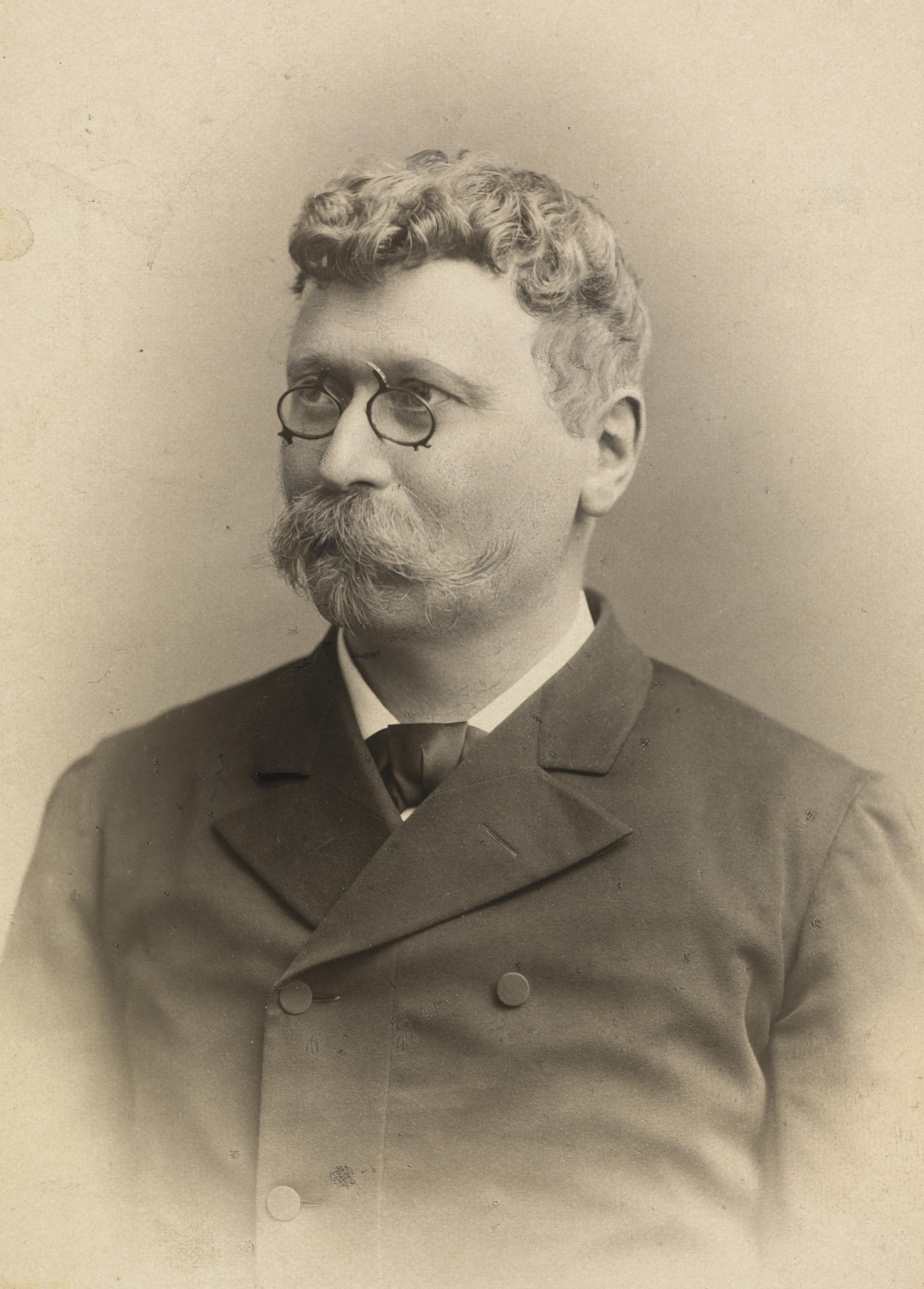
- Born: 11 May 1837; Farsund, Norway
- Died: 14 February 1885 (aged 47); New York City, U.S.
- Occupation: Singer
- Partner: Alfred Corning Clark

Lorentz Severin Skougaard (11 May 1837 - 14 February 1885) was a Norwegian tenor.

== Early life ==
Lorentz Severin Skougaard was born on 11 May 1837 in Farsund, Norway, the son of Jonas Eilertsen Lund Schougaard (1807-1877) and Sara Helene Jonasdatter Lund (1813-1910).

At first he was a trading officer, working at first in Memel, Norway, and then London. He later studied music in Paris and Italy.

== Career ==
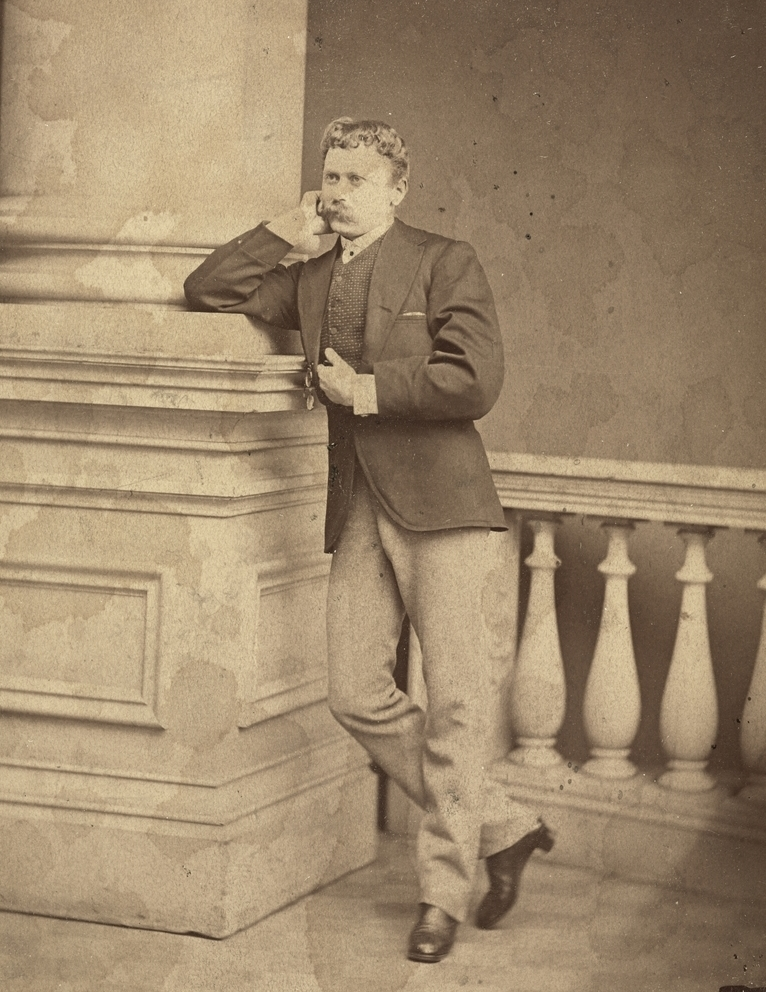
Lorentz Severin Skougaard in 1870

In 1864, Lorentz Severin Skougaard sang in Stockholm, Berlin, and Christiania. He met Alfred Corning Clark in Paris in 1866.

In 1866, Skougaard gave a series of recitals in New York City in conjunction with Alfred H. Pease at the Irving Hall. The recitals introduced him favorably to the New York public, and he became a successful vocal teacher. In 1874 he gave a charitable concert at the Steinway Hall in aid of the Scandinavian poor of New York City. There were a large number of performers and it was under the patronage of many prominent persons.

== Personal life ==
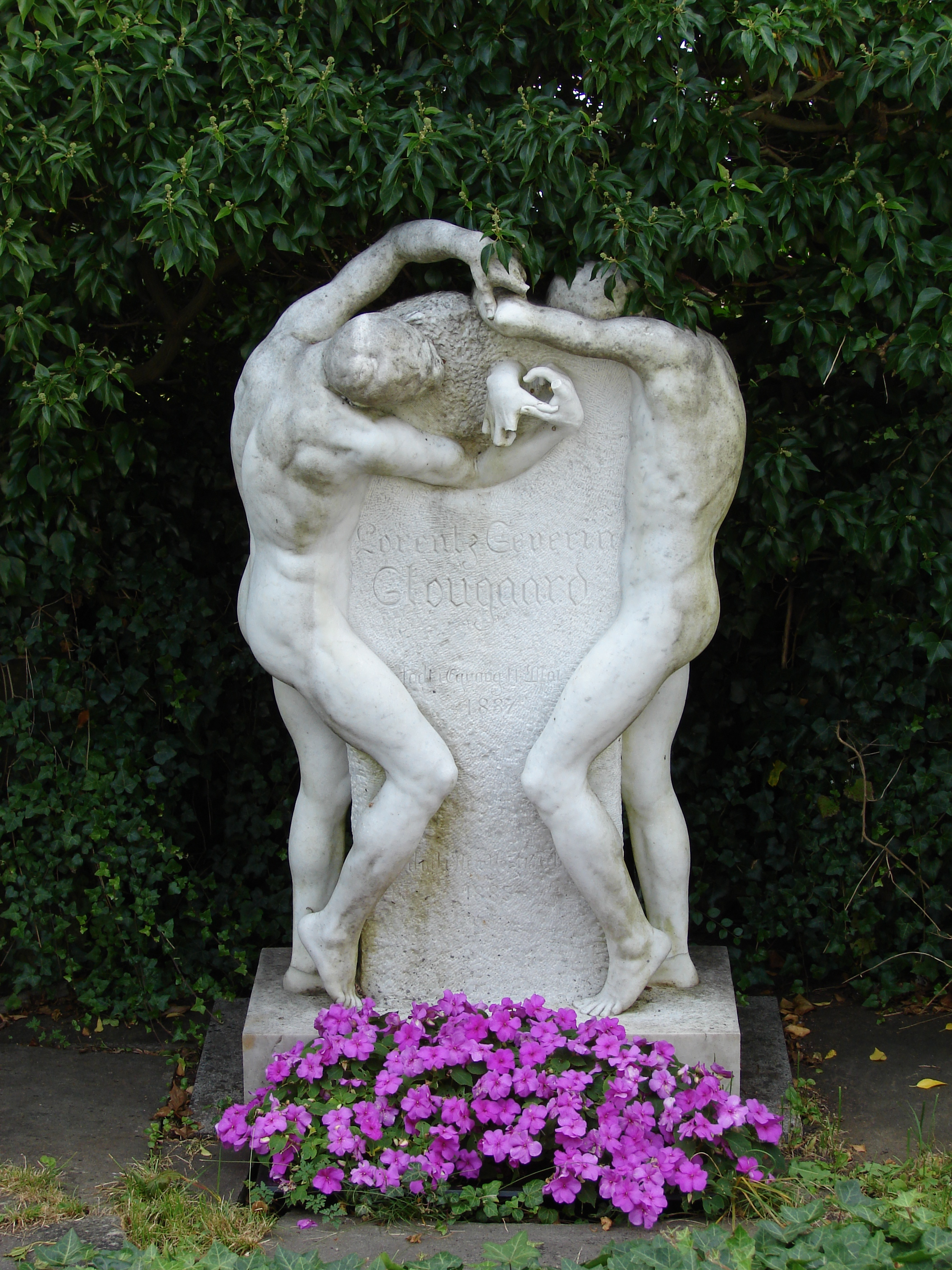
Brotherly Love (1886-87) by George Grey Barnard, Langesund, Norway

Lorentz Severin Skougaard moved to the United States in 1866. Clark began making annual summer visits to Norway with Skougaard in 1869, the same year that Clark married. The American eventually built a house on an island near Skougaard's family home. Clark's eldest son, born in 1870, was given the middle name of Severin. When in New York City, Skougaard stayed in Clark's flat at 64 West 22nd Street. The apartment was a favorite spot for evening musicales, attracted by Skougaard's companionable qualities, and the house for years was known as "Severini Hall". According to Nicholas Fox Weber's biography of the Clark family (The Clarks of Cooperstown, 2007), Clark led a double life, in the United States a family man, in Europe a gay aesthete. For 19 years his closest companion was Skougaard.

On 14 February 1885, in New York City, Skougaard died of typhoid fever.

=== Legacy ===
Clark eulogized his friend in a privately published biographical sketch, Lorentz Severin Skougaard: a sketch, mainly autobiographic, and created a $64,000 endowment in his memory for Manhattan's Norwegian Hospital, at 4th Avenue & 46th Street.

Clark also commissioned Brotherly Love (1886–87), by American sculptor George Grey Barnard, to adorn his friend's grave in Langesund, Norway. The homoerotic sculpture depicts two nude male figures blindly reaching out to each other through the block of marble that separates them.

Later, Barnard moved to New York City and Clark helped to maintain him.
