= 1837 United States Senate election in New York =

The 1837 United States Senate election in New York was held on February 7, 1837, by the New York State Legislature to elect a U.S. senator (Class 3) to represent the State of New York in the United States Senate.

== Background ==
Silas Wright, Jr., had been elected in 1833 to this seat after the resignation of William L. Marcy who had been elected Governor of New York. Wright's term would expire on March 3, 1837.

At the State election in November 1836, 94 Democrats and 34 Whigs were elected to the assembly, and seven of the eight state senators elected were Democrats. The 60th New York State Legislature met from January 3 to May 16, 1837, at Albany. The party strength in the Assembly as shown by the election for Speaker was: 80 for Democrat Edward Livingston and 27 for Whig Luther Bradish.

== Candidates ==
The incumbent U.S. Senator Silas Wright, Jr., was re-nominated in a Democratic caucus by a large majority.

== Result ==
Silas Wright, Jr., was the choice of both the Assembly and the Senate, and was declared elected.

1837 United States Senator election result
Office	House	Democrat		Whig	
U.S. Senator	State Senate (32 members)	Silas Wright, Jr.	26	Ambrose L. Jordan	3
	State Assembly (128 members)	Silas Wright, Jr.	85	Ambrose L. Jordan	27

== Aftermath ==
Wright continued in the U.S. Senate, was re-elected in 1843, and remained in office until November 1844 when he resigned after his election as Governor of New York.

== Sources ==
- The New York Civil List compiled in 1858 (see: pg. 63 for U.S. Senators; pg. 131 for state senators 1837; pg. 219f for Members of Assembly 1837)
- Members of the 25th United States Congress
- History of Political Parties in the State of New-York, Vol. II by Jabez Delano Hammond (State election, 1836: pg. 462; Speaker election, 1837: pg. 464; U.S. Senate election, 1837: pg. 465)
- Vote in Senate: Journal of the Senate (60th Session) (1837; pg. 94)
- Vote in Assembly: Journal of the Assembly (60th Session) (1837; pg. 243f)
