= Edwin Clark =

Edwin Clark may refer to:

- Edwin Clark (civil engineer) (1814–1894), English civil engineer
- Edwin N. Clark (1902–1982), US Army general
- Edwin Hill Clark (1878–1967), American architect
- Edwin Clark (politician) (1927–2025), Nigerian politician

== See also ==
- Edwin Clarke (1919–1996), British medical historian and neurologist
- Edward Clark (disambiguation)
