= Alfred Corning Clark =

American philanthropist

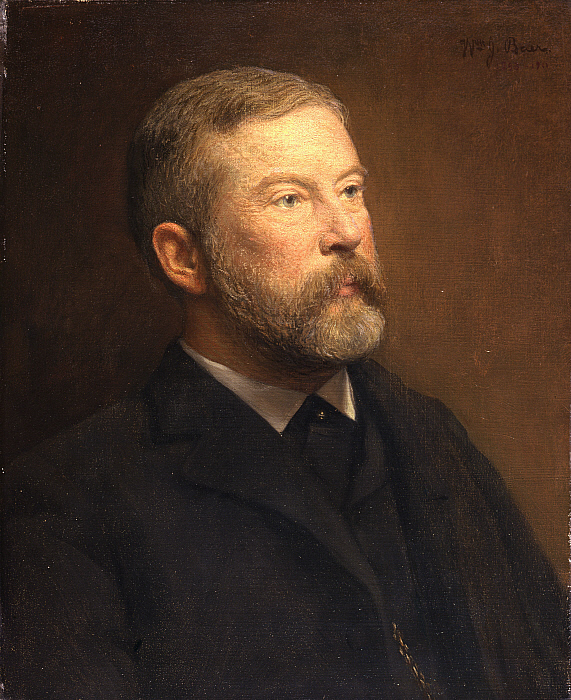
- Portrait of Alfred Corning Clark (1893), by William Jacob Baer, Clark Art Institute
- Born: November 14, 1844; New York City, U.S.
- Died: April 8, 1896 (aged 51); New York City, U.S.
- Spouse: Elizabeth Scriven (m. 1869)
- Partner(s): Lorentz Severin Skougaard; George Grey Barnard
- Children: Edward Severin Clark; Robert Sterling Clark; F. Ambrose Clark; Stephen Carlton Clark
- Parent(s): Edward Cabot Clark; Caroline Jordan Clark

Alfred Corning Clark I (November 14, 1844 – April 8, 1896) was an American philanthropist and patron of the arts.

== Early life ==
He was the son of Edward Cabot Clark (1811–1882) and Caroline (née Jordan) Clark (1815–1874). His father made a fortune as the partner of Isaac Singer in the Singer Sewing Machine Company, invested it in Manhattan, New York City real estate, and left a $25,000,000 (approximately $834,052,000 today) estate at his death.

Clark's maternal grandfather was Ambrose L. Jordan, a New York State Senator who served as the New York State Attorney General.

== Personal life ==
On October 20, 1869, Clark married Elizabeth Scriven (1848–1909), the daughter of George Scriven and Ellen Rattan Scriven of Brooklyn, New York. Her parents had emigrated from Great Britain, and the wedding took place at Withecombe in Manor of Raleigh, Pilton, Devon, England. Alfred and Elizabeth Clark were the parents of four sons:

- Edward Severin Clark (1870–1933)
- Robert Sterling Clark (1877–1956)
- Frederick Ambrose Clark (1880–1964)
- Stephen Carlton Clark (1882–1960)

Clark maintained three residences in Manhattan: a city house at 7 West 22nd Street for his family, a nearby flat at 64 West 22nd Street for guests, and a large apartment in The Dakota overlooking Central Park for entertaining. Clark's father built The Dakota (1880–84), but died during its construction. Edward Cabot Clark bequeathed the building to his 12-year-old grandson and namesake, Edward Severin Clark.

Clark died of pneumonia on April 8, 1896, in Manhattan, New York City. Six years after his death, his widow became the second wife of Henry Codman Potter, the Episcopal bishop of New York, in 1902.

=== Other relationships ===
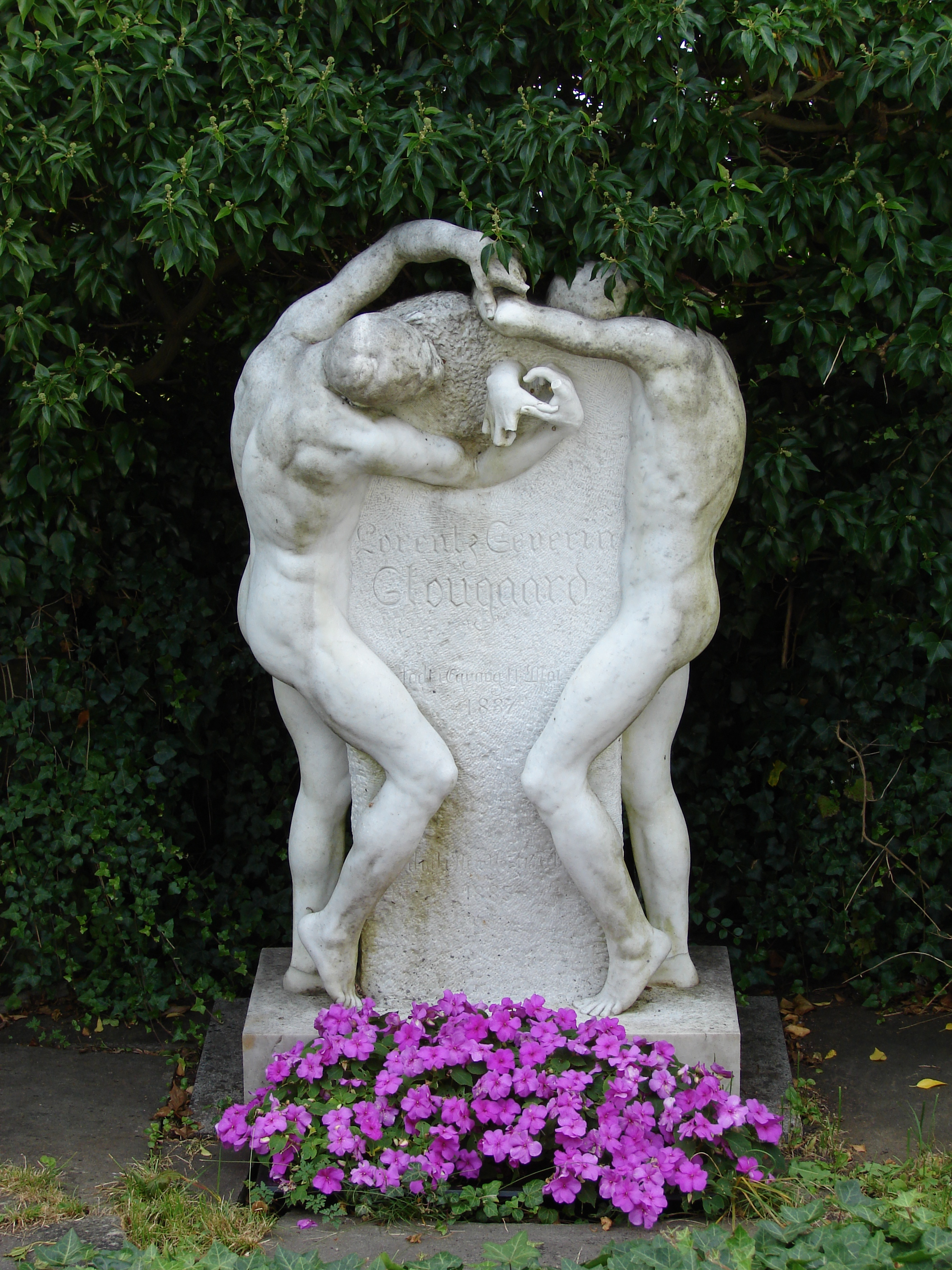
Brotherly Love (1886–87), by George Grey Barnard, Skougaard gravemarker, Langesund Churchyard, Langesund, Norway

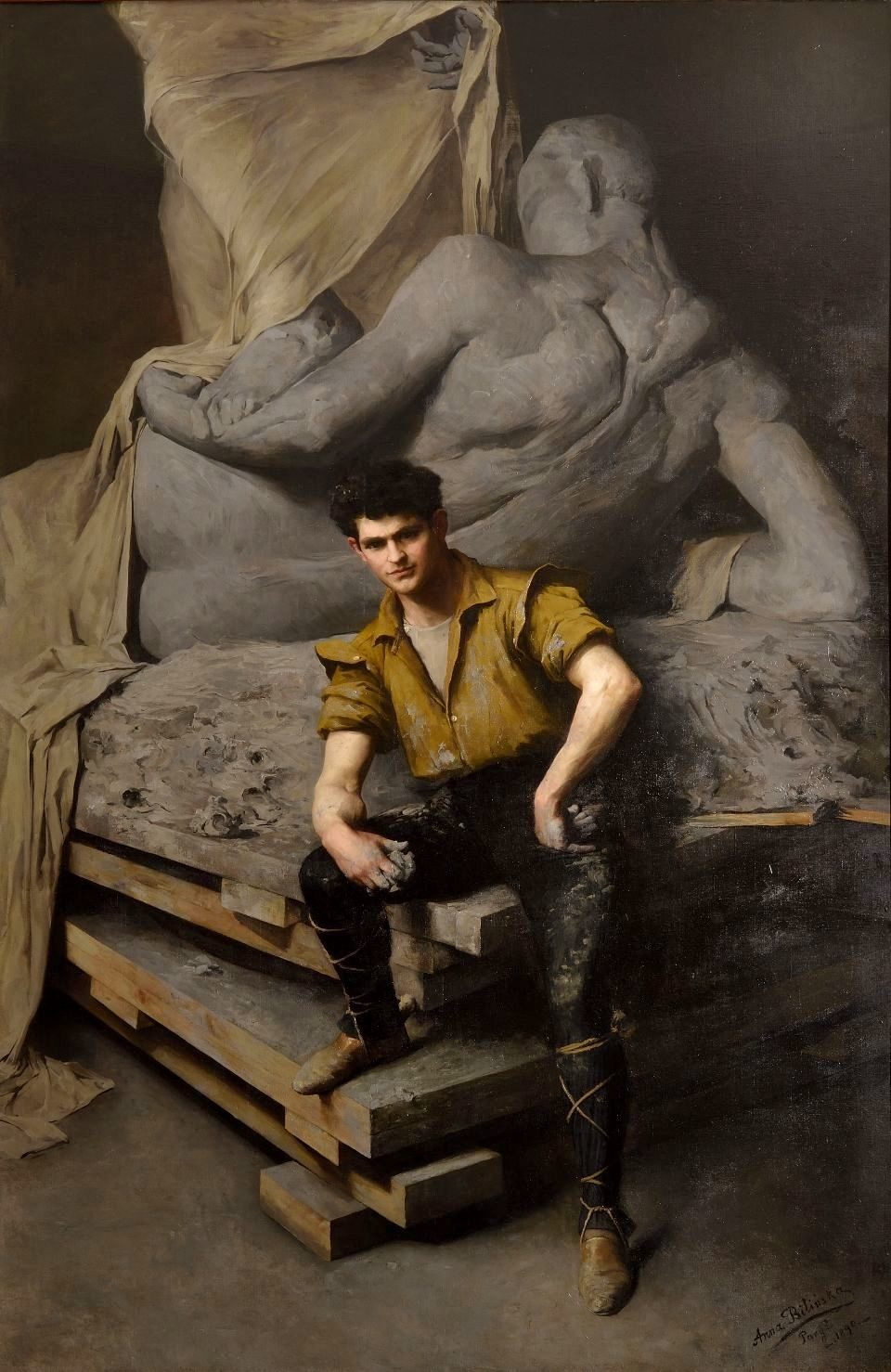
George Grey Barnard at Work on His Sculpture I Feel Two Natures Struggling within Me (1890), by Anna Bilińska, State Museum of Pennsylvania

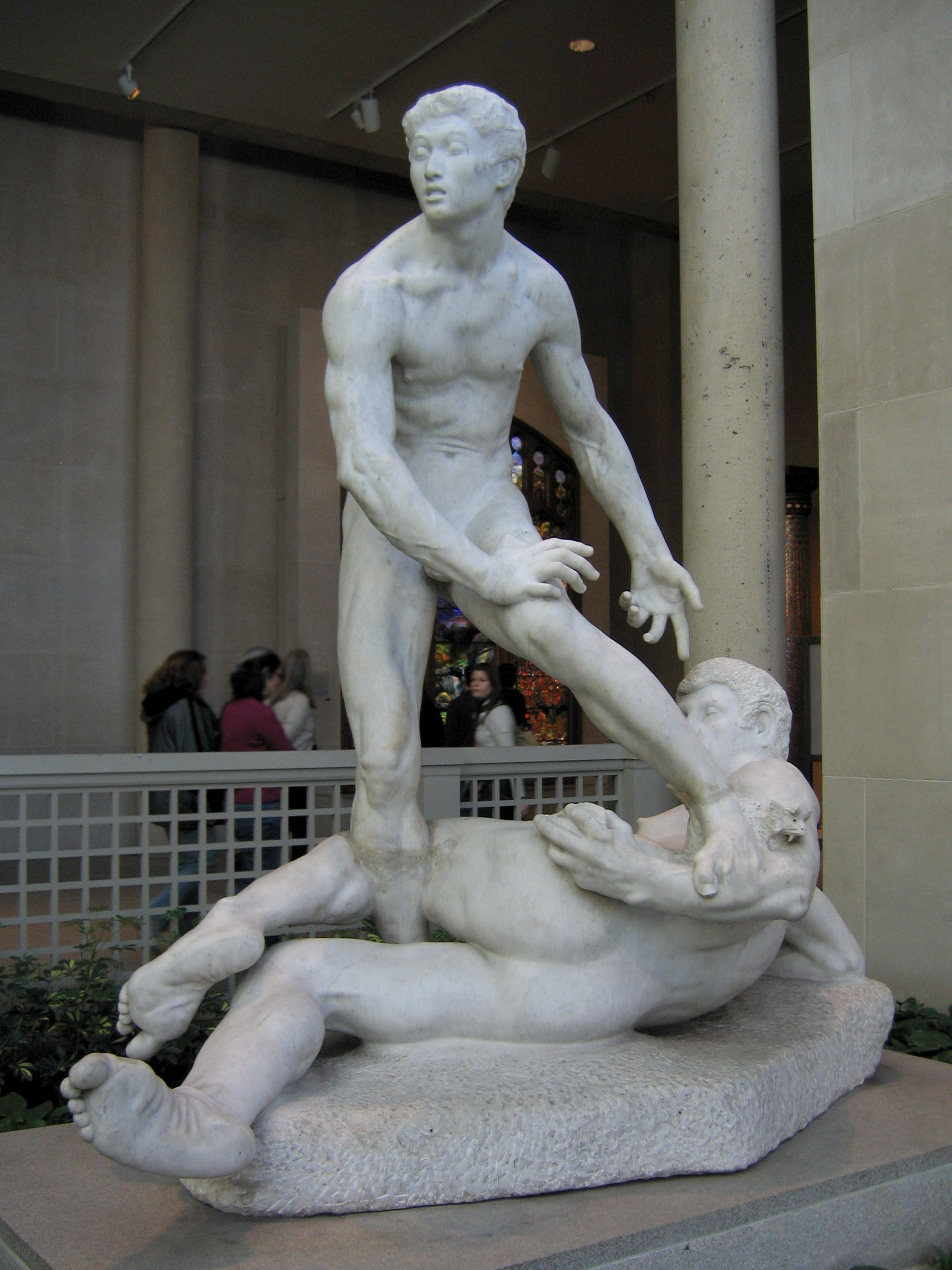
Struggle of the Two Natures in Man (1892–94), by George Grey Barnard, Metropolitan Museum of Art

In 1866, Clark met Norwegian tenor Lorentz Severin Skougaard (1837–1885) in Paris, where the singer was studying. In 1869, the same year that he married Elizabeth Scriven, Clark began making annual summer visits to Norway, eventually building a house on an island near Skougaard's family home. He gave his eldest son Edward, born 1870, the middle name Severin. When Skougaard was in New York City he occupied Clark's flat at 64 West 22nd Street. During an 1885 visit, Skougaard was stricken with typhoid and died. Clark eulogized him in a privately published biographical sketch, and created a $64,000 endowment in his memory for Manhattan's Norwegian Hospital, at 4th Avenue & 46th Street. Clark also commissioned Brotherly Love (1886–87) by American sculptor George Grey Barnard to adorn his friend's grave in Langesund, Norway. The homoerotic sculpture depicts two nude male figures blindly reaching out to each other through the block of marble that separates them.

According to Debby Applegate's review in The New York Times Book Review of Nicholas Fox Weber's group biography, The Clarks of Cooperstown (2007):

Weber suggests that Alfred [Corning Clark] led a dual life: a quiet family man in America and a gay aesthete in Europe, especially in France, which he declared "the Mecca of brotherly feeling." He was a generous patron to male artists; for 19 years his closest companion was a Norwegian tenor named Lorentz Severin Skougaard. When his father's death forced him to return to Manhattan, Alfred installed Skougaard down the block from the town house where he lived with his wife and children. [Henry] James's shadow lingers longest in this chapter; surely this was the sort of thing he meant by those uneasy intimations that beneath Europe's splendor and refinement lurked something unspeakable. Weber's bluntness, by contrast, highlights how much of that beauty was created by gay men seeking warm communities of free expression.

Following Skougaard's death, Clark became Barnard's patron, commissioning works and providing financial support to him in Paris. Clark paid Barnard $25,000 to carve a marble version of his Struggle of the Two Natures in Man (1888), which was completed in April 1894. Barnard exhibited the piece at the 1894 Paris Salon, where the jury, headed by Auguste Rodin, pronounced it a work "of superlative merit". Clark brought the larger-than-life-sized sculpture to New York City. Soon after his death, Clark's widow donated it to the Metropolitan Museum of Art.

== Philanthropy ==
Between 1888 and 1891, Clark built the first gymnasium in Cooperstown, New York. Although it remained popular, by the 1920s the facility had become obsolete and was demolished and rebuilt by his son Edward Severin Clark. A new Alfred Corning Clark Gymnasium opened in 1930, and featured such improvements as a swimming pool and bowling alleys. The current successor to the 1930 ACC Gym is the Clark Sports Center a greatly expanded facility, completed in the mid-1980s, located on the former grounds of Iroquois Farm (the F. Ambrose Clark estate) under the direction of Stephen Carlton Clark Jr., the great-grandson of the gym's founder.

=== Jozef Hofmann ===
Clark's donation of $50,000 to the piano prodigy Jozef Hofmann in 1887 spared the eleven-year-old from having to complete a fifty-recital American tour that had been criticized by Society for the Prevention of Cruelty to Children. With this financial security, Hofmann and his family returned to Europe where the boy could receive a broader education before resuming his concert career. In addition to becoming one of history's most outstanding piano virtuosi, Hofmann's study in science and mathematics enabled him to become an inventor in later life, earning over 70 patents.

== Art collection ==
Clark assembled a collection of French academic paintings. He purchased Pollice Verso (Thumbs Down) (1872) by Jean-Léon Gérôme from the estate of Alexander Turney Stewart. It is now in the collection of the Phoenix Art Museum. In 1888, he purchased Gerome's The Snake Charmer (1880), but his widow sold it after his death. His son Sterling re-acquired the painting in 1942 for the museum he founded, the Sterling and Francine Clark Art Institute. Clark donated works to the Metropolitan Museum of Art, including Madame Gaye (1865) by Marià Fortuny.

Clark commissioned Barnard to create a fountain sculpture for the courtyard of The Dakota. The Great God Pan (1894–1898) was never installed at the apartment building, and Clark's family donated it to Columbia University after his death.

=== Works once owned by Alfred Corning Clark ===
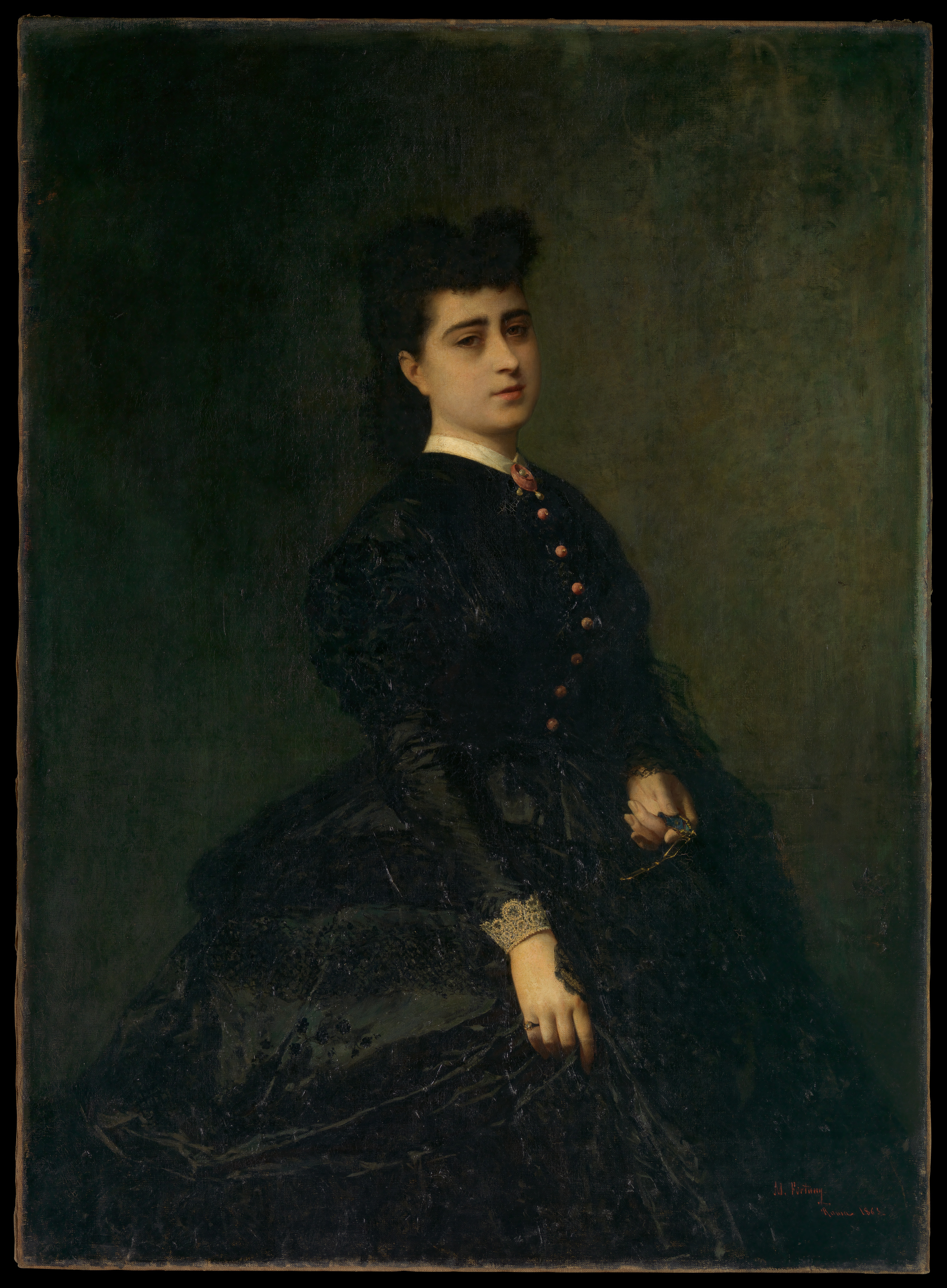
Madame Gaye (1865) by Marià Fortuny, Metropolitan Museum of Art

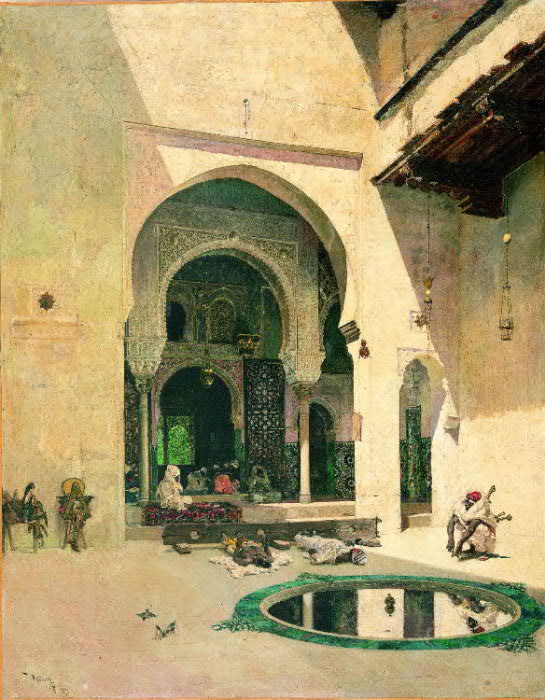
Court of the Alhambra (1871), Museu Fundacio Gala-Salvador Dalí

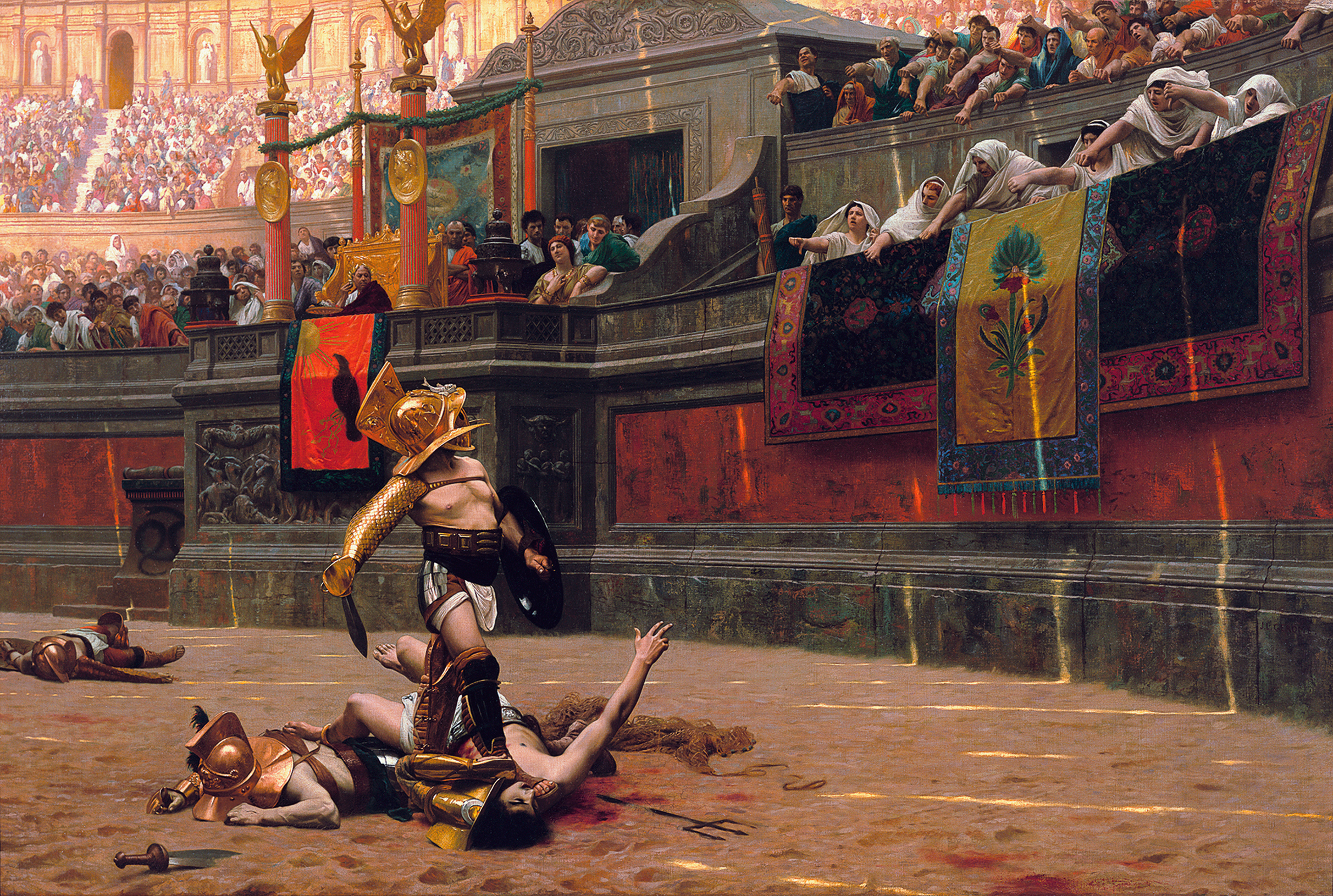
Pollice Verso (1872) by Jean-Léon Gérôme, Phoenix Art Museum

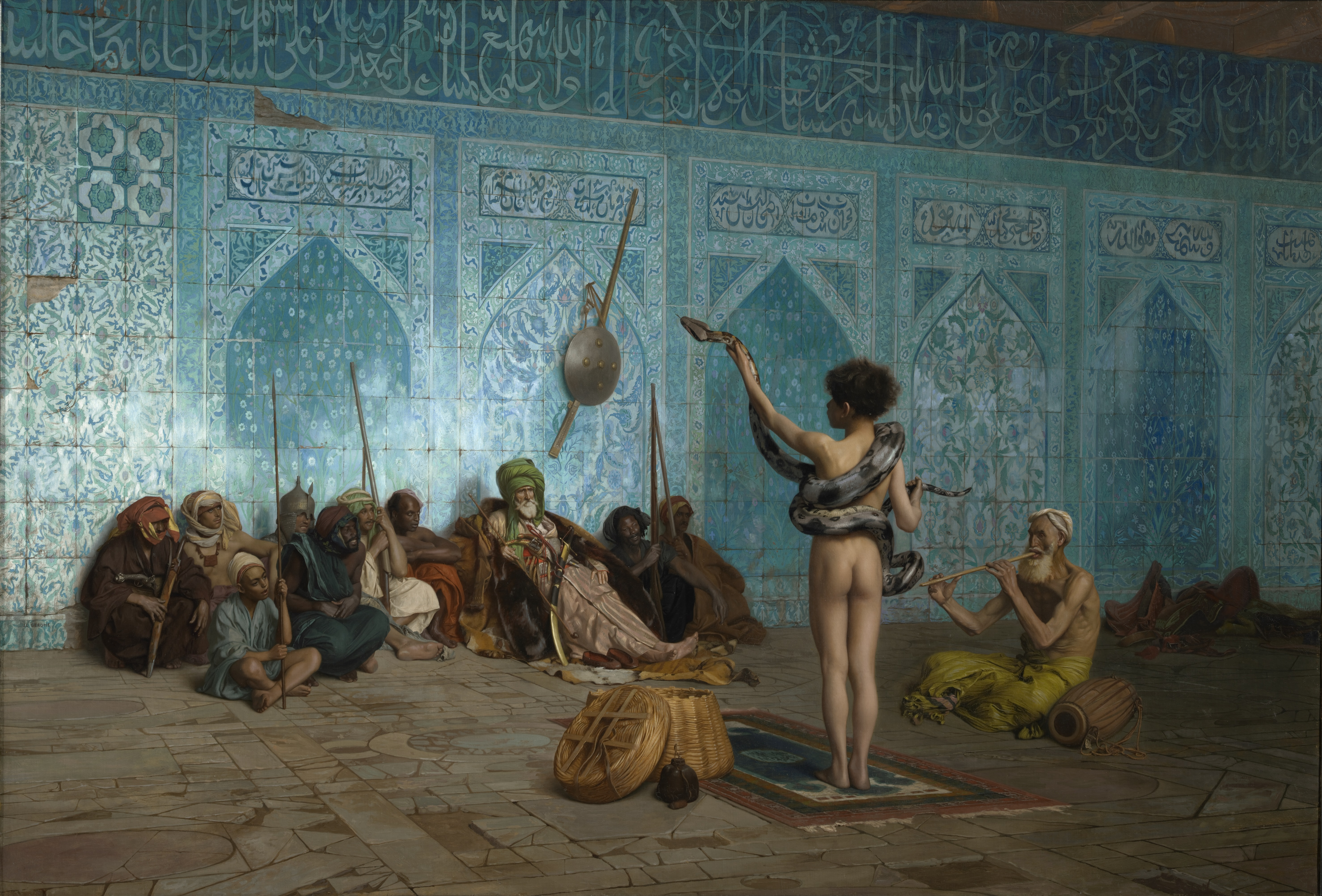
The Snake Charmer (1880) by Jean-Léon Gérôme, Clark Art Institute

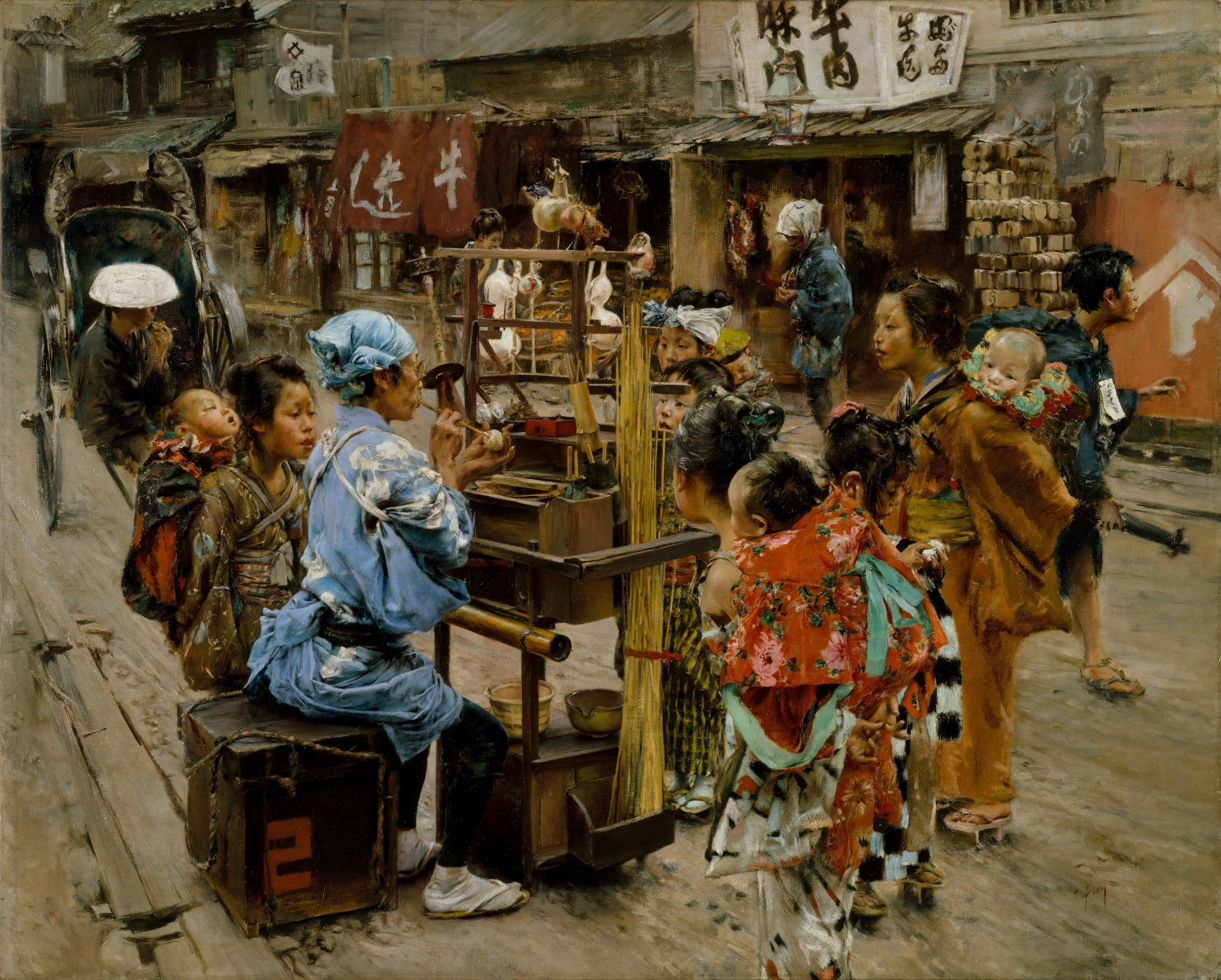
The Ameya (1893) by Robert Frederick Blum, Metropolitan Museum of Art

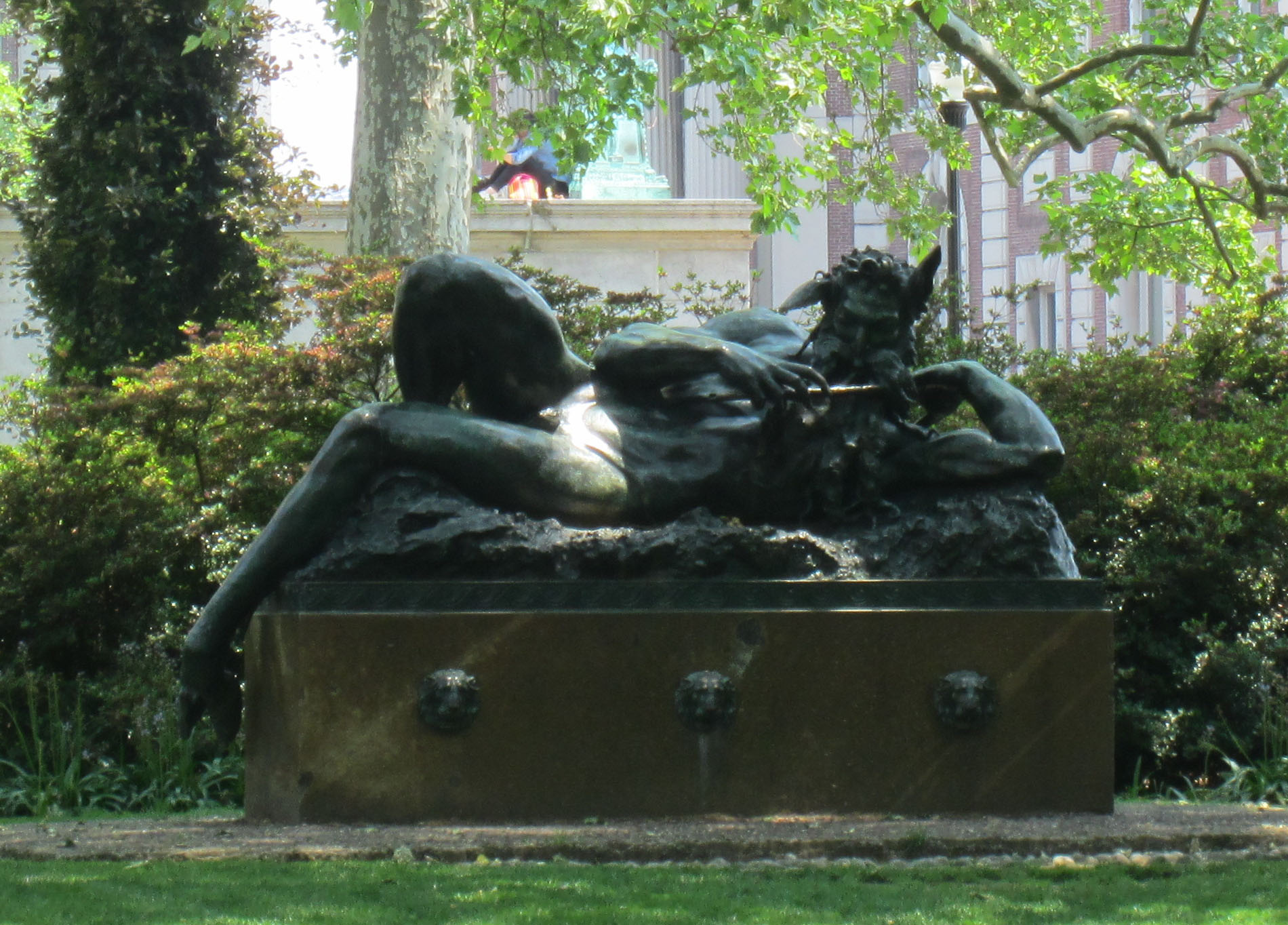
The Great God Pan (1894–1898), by George Grey Barnard, Columbia University

== Legacy ==
In memory of her first husband, Elizabeth Scriven Clark Potter built the Alfred Corning Clark Memorial Chapel at the Episcopal Church of the Good Shepard, 240 East 31st Street, Manhattan, New York City. The chapel was consecrated on December 7, 1904.
