= Francine Clark =

French actress, art collector, horse breeder and philanthropist

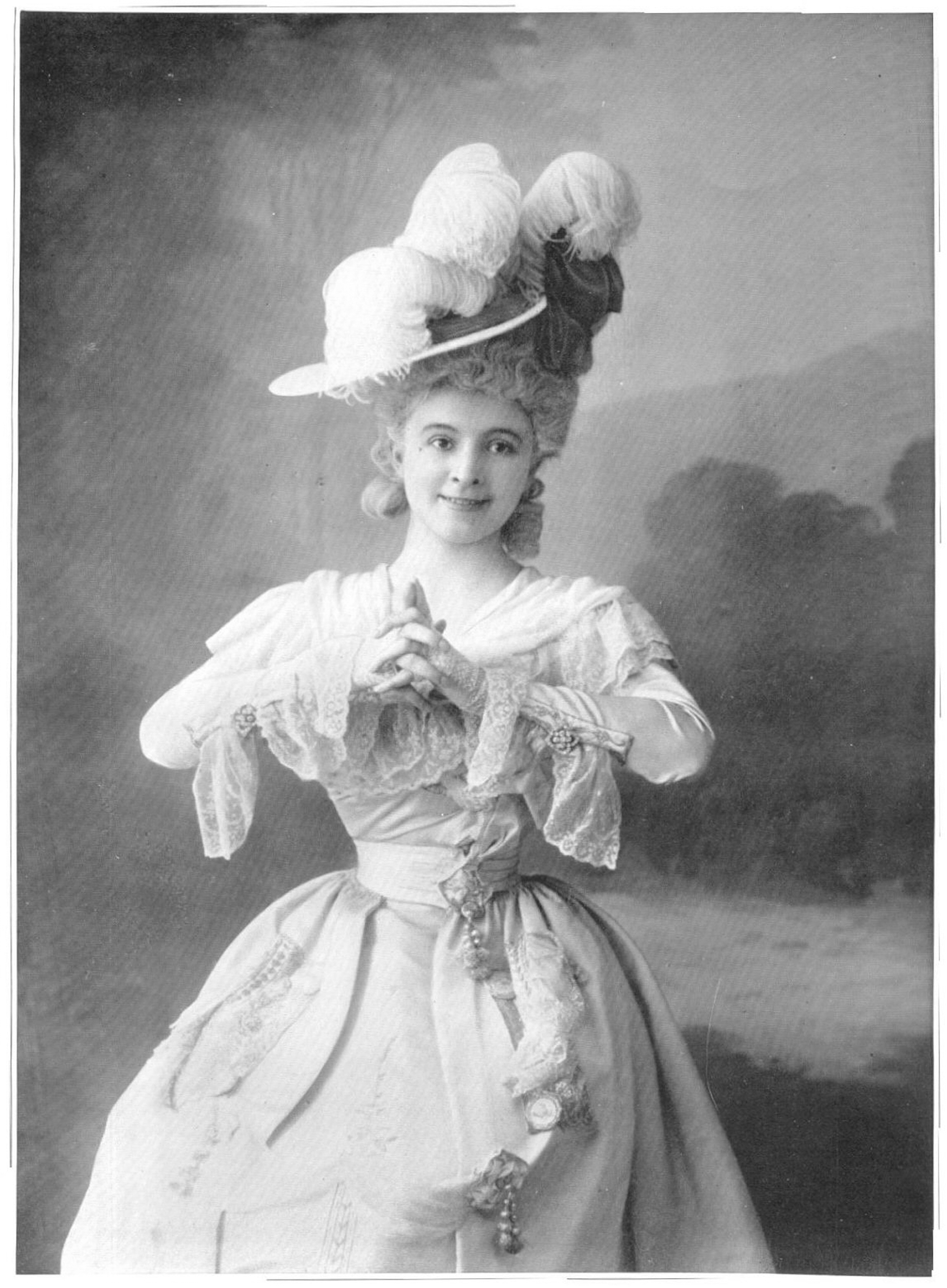
Francine Clark in costume, c.1900

Francine Clark (1876–1960) was a French actress, art collector, horse breeder, and philanthropist.

== Personal life ==
Francine Juliette Modzelewska was born in 1876 in France to a single mother who worked as a dressmaker. Francine changed her Polish surname Modzelewska to "Clary" sometime during her late teens. An actress with the famed Comédie Française, Francine appeared on stage with Sarah Bernhardt during her career.

Francine married Sterling Clark of the Singer Sewing Machine fortune in 1919. Francine had a daughter, Viviane, from a previous relationship which proved to be a source of tension among the Clark family. None of the other Clarks attended Francine and Sterling's civil ceremony held in France. Francine became an American citizen the day after the ceremony. The Clarks moved to New York City and established their residency in an eighteen-room apartment on Park Avenue, but continued to split their time between Paris and New York City for the remainder of their lives. Francine and Sterling "adored each other," a friend of theirs later wrote, and shared a taste for "great comfort without ostentation, good food and ... vintage Bordeaux."

Francine and Sterling raced horses in the United States and Europe. In 1930, they purchased forty-five acres in Normandy to establish a horse farm, in addition to building a large horse farm in Upperville, Virginia.

Francine Clark died in 1960.

== Art collecting ==
Together, the Clarks created a collection of paintings, silver, sculpture, porcelain, drawings, and prints with complete reliance on their own judgments and tastes. Like her husband, Francine had an avid interest in collecting art, giving her opinions when the couple met with dealers. Sterling referred to his wife as his "touchstone in judging pictures." He once described Francine as "an excellent judge, much better than I am at times, though I have known her to make mistakes on account of charming subjects."

In 1950 the Clarks founded the Sterling and Francine Clark Art Institute as a permanent home for their collection. During construction, Sterling and Francine lived in an apartment on the campus, overseeing every detail of the original 1955 building. The museum first opened to the public in 1955.
