= Edward Cabot Clark =

American businessman and investor (1811–1882)

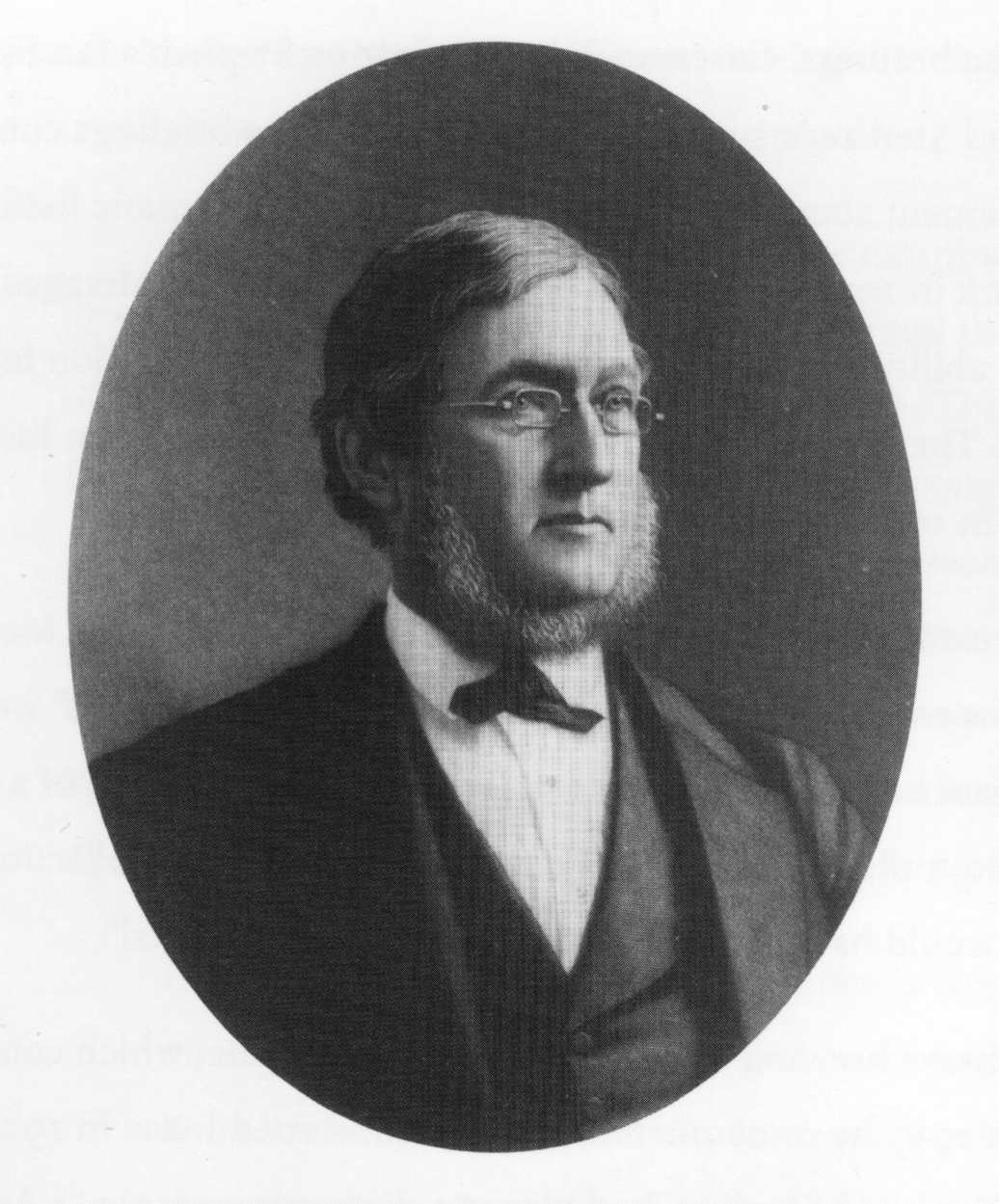
- Born: December 19, 1811; Athens, New York, U.S.
- Died: October 14, 1882 (aged 70); Cooperstown, New York, U.S.
- Education: Lenox Academy
- Alma mater: Williams College
- Spouse: Caroline Jordan (m. 1835; died 1874)
- Children: 4, including Alfred
- Relatives: Edward Severin Clark (grandson); F. Ambrose Clark (grandson); Robert Sterling Clark (grandson); Stephen Carlton Clark (grandson)

Edward Cabot Clark (December 19, 1811 – October 14, 1882) was an American lawyer, businessman and investor.

== Early life ==
Clark was born on December 19, 1811, in Athens in Greene County, New York. He was the eldest child of three sons born to Nathan Clark (1787–1880) and Julia (née Nichols) Clark (1793–1873), who married in February 1811. His younger brothers were Nathan Henry Clark (who died in infancy), and Nathan Clark Jr., who took over their father's potter company. His father was an early settler of Athens and established the prominent and highly successful firm, Athens Pottery Works.

His maternal grandparents were from Waterbury, Connecticut, and his paternal grandparents were Reuben Clark and Mary (née Peppard) Clark.

After spending four years at the Lenox Academy in Lenox, Massachusetts, where he learned Latin and Greek, in the fall of 1826, Clark began attending Williams College in Williamstown, Massachusetts, where he graduated in August 1831 and later built Clark Hall.

== Career ==
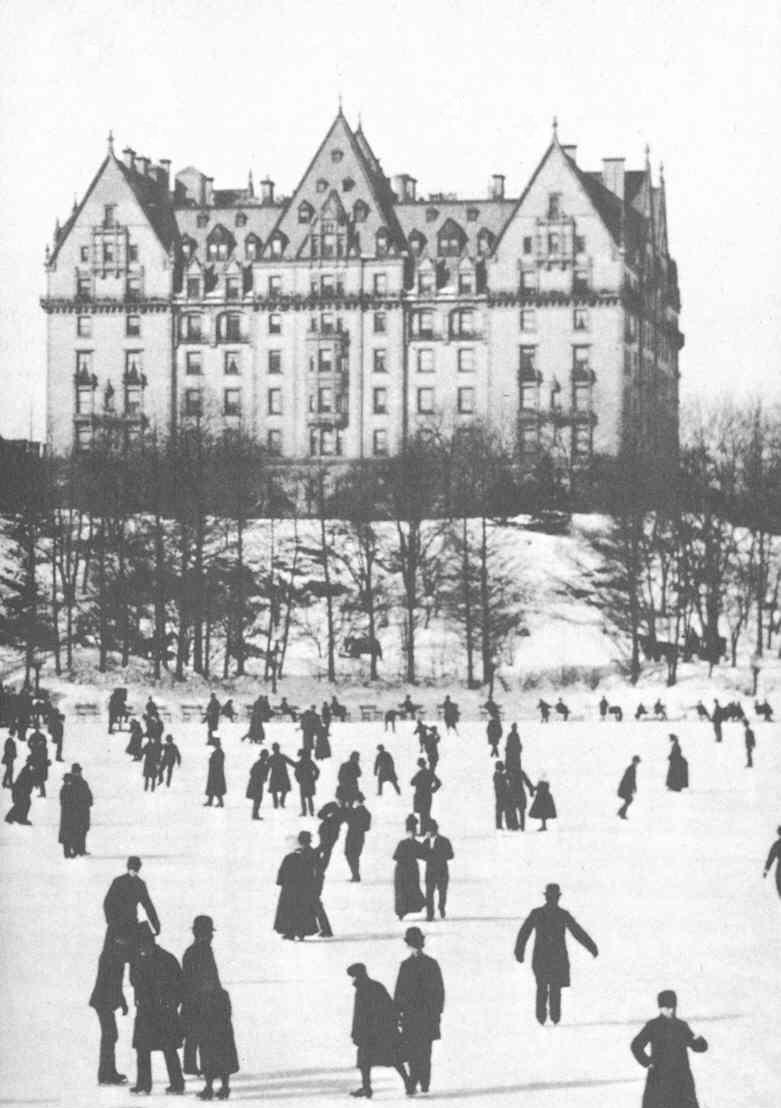
The Dakota, from Central Park Lake (1880s).

After graduation from Williams in 1831, Clark studied law with Ambrose L. Jordan (a former New York State Senator and later became the New York State Attorney General in 1848) in Hudson, New York, passed the bar three years later. Clark later set up a solo practice in Poughkeepsie, New York, practicing from 1833 to 1837, before becoming a partner of Jordan and moving the firm to New York City in 1838 where the firm became "the most prestigious law firm in the city."

In 1849, Clark met Isaac Merritt Singer and advised Singer in the naming and patent of his invention, the sewing machine, which "Singer assigned Edward three-eighths of it, apparently in lieu of paying legal fees that the penniless inventor could not afford." In 1851, Singer returned to Clark to defend him in patent litigation initiated by Elias Howe, who had created the lockstitch sewing machine. Later that same year, Clark and Singer co-founded the Singer Sewing Machine Company. In 1856, Clark created the hire-purchase plan, which was the first American installment plan. After Singer's death in 1875, Clark returned to the company, which had been reorganized in 1865, and guided the company to greater success as president from 1875 until his retirement in 1882.

=== Real estate ===
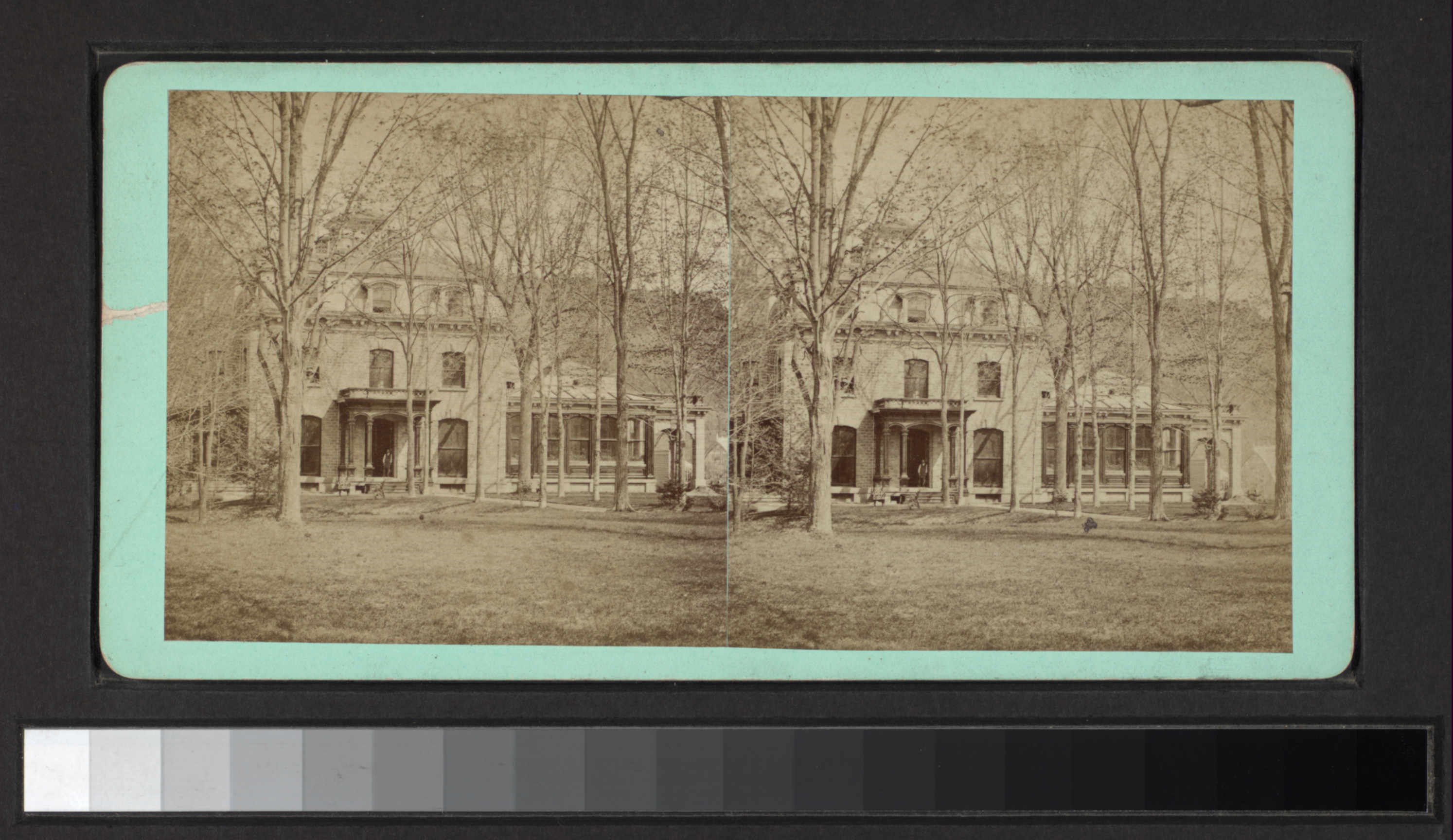
"Fernleigh" (1869)

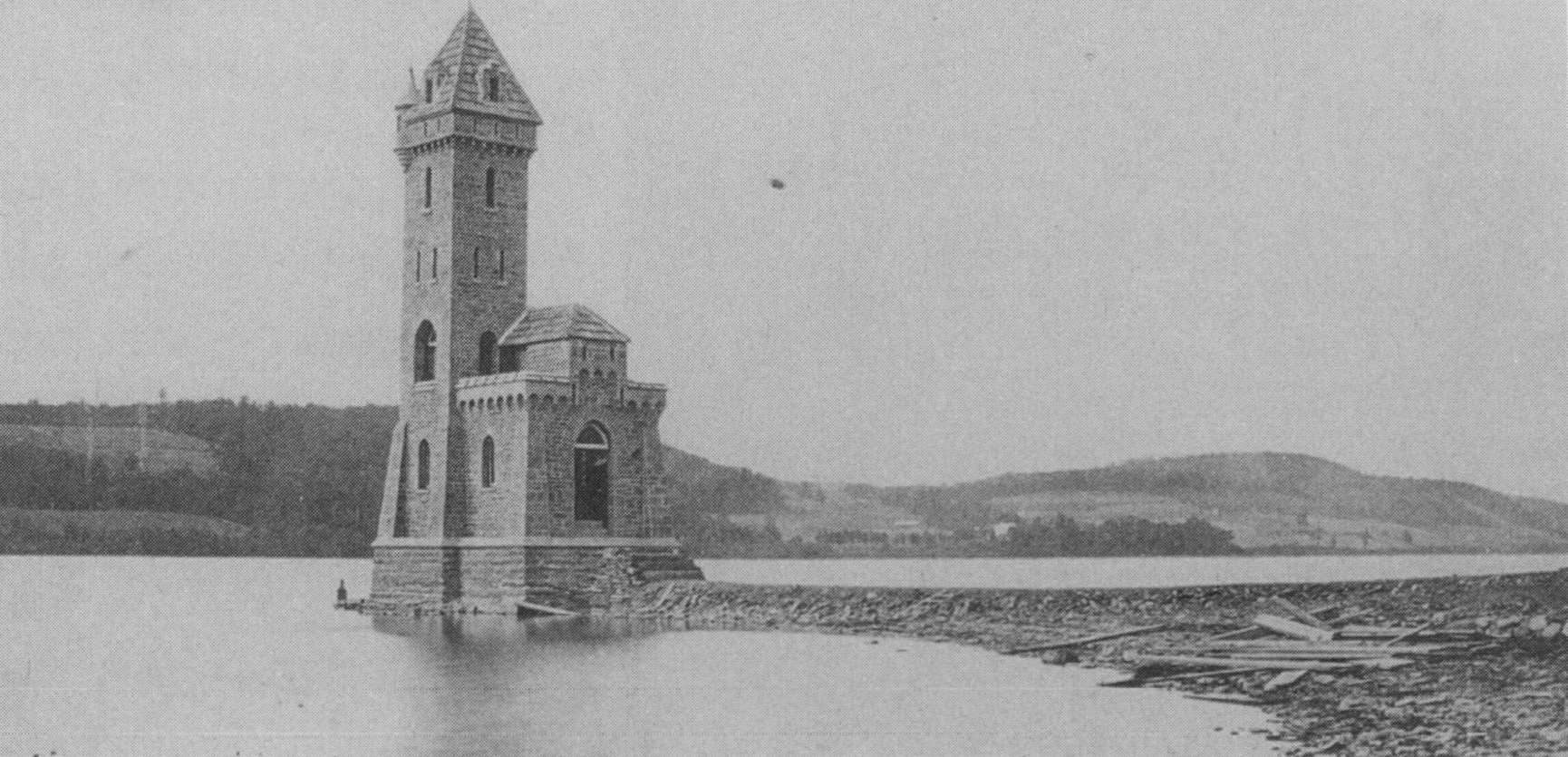
Kingfisher Tower on Otsego Lake, c. 1880}.

Clark began investing in New York City real estate in the 1870s. He purchased a parcel on Seventh Avenue between West 55th and West 57th Streets where he built a French inspired luxury apartment building known as the "Van Corlear" (named in honor of Anthony Van Corlaer).

Clark also purchased a parcel on Central Park West and 72nd Street where he had Henry Janeway Hardenbergh's architectural firm design and build The Dakota, an apartment house originally known as "Clark's folly" before he adopted the name Dakota (reportedly in reference to its distant location from then fashionable New York, which was akin to the Dakota Territory). Construction started in October 1880 and was completed in 1884, two years after Clark's death in October 1882. Upon his death, The Dakota was bequeathed to his 12-year-old grandson and namesake, Edward Severin Clark. Clark and his heirs also built a row of houses immediately north of the Dakota, which were completed in 1884–1885.

In Cooperstown, New York, where his father-in-law practiced law and had served as the District Attorney, Clark bought significant amounts of land had built the Hotel Fenimore, Pioneer Mills, and several cottages and farm houses. In 1856, Clark bought the "Apple Hill" estate near Cooperstown, on the shore of Otsego Lake. On the property, he built a large stone country house known as "Fernleigh" in 1869. In 1874, he acquired an additional 500 acres where he built a Swiss chalet and, in 1876, he again hired Hardenbergh to build him a Gothic Revival castle that rose out of Otsego Lake and became known as Kingfisher Tower.

== Personal life ==
On October 21, 1835, Clark married Caroline Jordan (1815–1874). Caroline was the daughter of Cornelia Caroline (née Philip) Jordan and Ambrose L. Jordan, his law partner. Together, they traveled around Europe, collecting art and renting homes, in France and in Italy where they spent a winter. Caroline and Edward were the parents of four children, three of whom predeceased him, including:

- Ambrose Jordan Clark (1836–1880), who died unmarried.
- Edward Lorraine Clark (1838–1860), who died unmarried in Rome where he was studying as an artist in the Vatican.
- Julia Elise Clark (1841–1841), who died in infancy.
- Alfred Corning Clark (1844–1896), who married Elizabeth Scriven (1848–1909) at Withecombe in Raleigh. After his death, his widow remarried to Bishop Henry Codman Potter.

Clark died of malarial fever at his country estate in Cooperstown in Otsego County, New York, on October 14, 1882. Upon his death, he left an estate estimated between $25,000,000 (equivalent to $834,051,724 today) and $50,000,000 (equivalent to $1,668,103,448 today), excluding his real estate portfolio, which he left to his grandsons. Clark bequeathed $50,000 (equivalent to $1,668,103 today) to Williams College, $250,000 (equivalent to $8,340,517 today) to his daughter-in-law Elizabeth, $250,000 to each of his four grandsons (in addition to the real estate) and left the residuary estate to his only surviving son, Alfred.

=== Descendants ===
Through his son Alfred, his only child to marry and have children, he was the paternal grandfather of Edward Severin Clark, F. Ambrose Clark, Robert Sterling Clark, Stephen Carlton Clark.
