= Edward Clerke =

17th-century Anglican priest in Ireland

Edward Clerke was an Anglican priest in Ireland in the first half of the 17th century.

Clerke was educated at Trinity College, Dublin. He was ordained priest on 24 June 1601. He was Prebendary of Killanully then Dean of Cloyne from 1615 to 1640.
