= Edward Goodman Clarke =

English physician

- Born: London
- Occupation: Physician

Edward Goodman Clarke (fl. 1812) was an English physician.

== Biography ==
Clarke was born in London. He was a pupil of Mr. Cline, sen., at the same period with Astley Cooper, but on his fathers death he bought a commission in the 1st foot. Going to the West Indies, he married Miss Duncan, his colonel's daughter, but relapsed into intemperate habits, and took to writing as a refuge from starvation. He was admitted M.D. at Aberdeen on 24 October 1791, and licentiate of the London College of Physicians in 1792. He was appointed a physician to the army by the influence of Cline and Astley Cooper, but did not mend his habits, and finally died of diseased liver. He wrote:

- 'Medicinæ Praxeos Compendium,' 1799.
- 'The Modern Practice of Physic,' 1805.
- 'Conspectus of the London, Edinburgh, and Dublin Pharmacopœia,' 1810.
- 'The New London Practice of Physic,' British Museum copy marked seventh edition, 1811 (a much enlarged edition of 2). In it he manifests very little knowledge of disease; he still advocates inoculation as the best remedy for small-pox, and mentions vaccination slightingly.
