= Edward Severin Clark =

American businessman (1870–1933)

Edward Severin Clark (July 6, 1870 – September 19, 1933) was an American businessman, and the owner of the New York City apartment building The Dakota.

== Early life ==
Clark was born on July 6, 1870, in Neuilly, France. He was the eldest of the four sons of Alfred Corning Clark (1844–1896) and Elizabeth (née Scriven) Clark (1848–1909). The brothers grew up in New York City and Cooperstown, New York. After his father's death in 1896, his mother remarried to Bishop Henry Codman Potter.

His paternal grandfather, Edward Cabot Clark, was Isaac Singer's partner in the Singer Sewing Machine Company, and built Manhattan apartment buildings, including The Dakota. His grandfather died during construction of The Dakota and bequeathed it to Edward, his 12-year-old grandson and namesake.

== Career ==
Edward and one of his younger brothers, Stephen Carlton Clark, built a number of large buildings in Cooperstown, including The Otesaga Resort Hotel (1909), the Mary Imogene Bassett Hospital (1918), and the Alfred Corning Clark Gymnasium (1930).

Another brother, Robert Sterling Clark, founded the Sterling and Francine Clark Art Institute.

== Personal life ==
Edward, who never married nor had children, died at his farm in Cooperstown on September 19, 1933.

"Fenimore House," the mansion he built for himself overlooking Otsego Lake, is now the Fenimore Art Museum. His former dairy farm is now the Fenimore Farm & Country Village. He donated the sculpture The Great God Pan (1899) by George Grey Barnard to Columbia University in 1907.

== Gallery ==
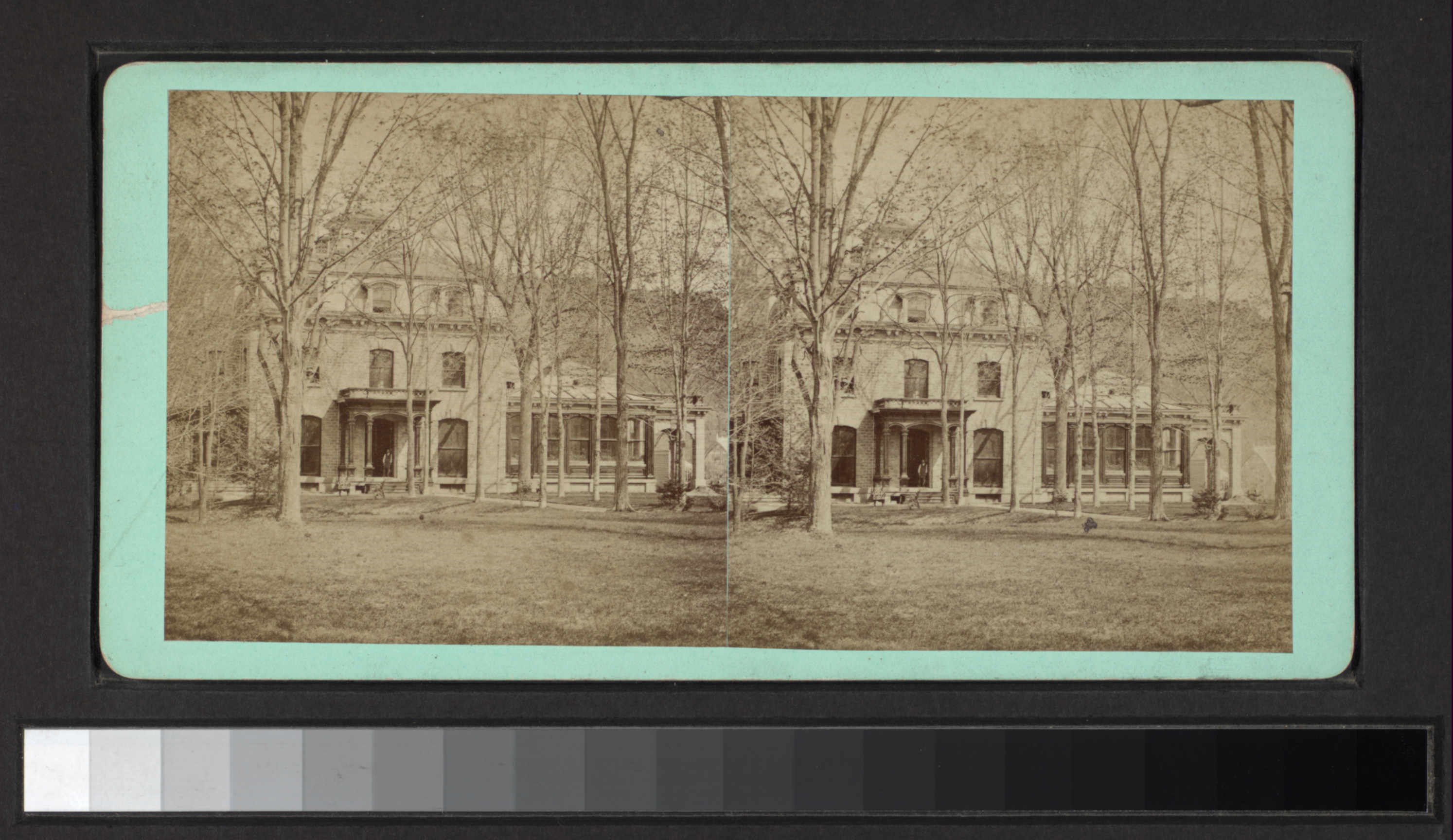
"Fernleigh" (1869) Edward Cabot Clark residence, Copperstown, New York

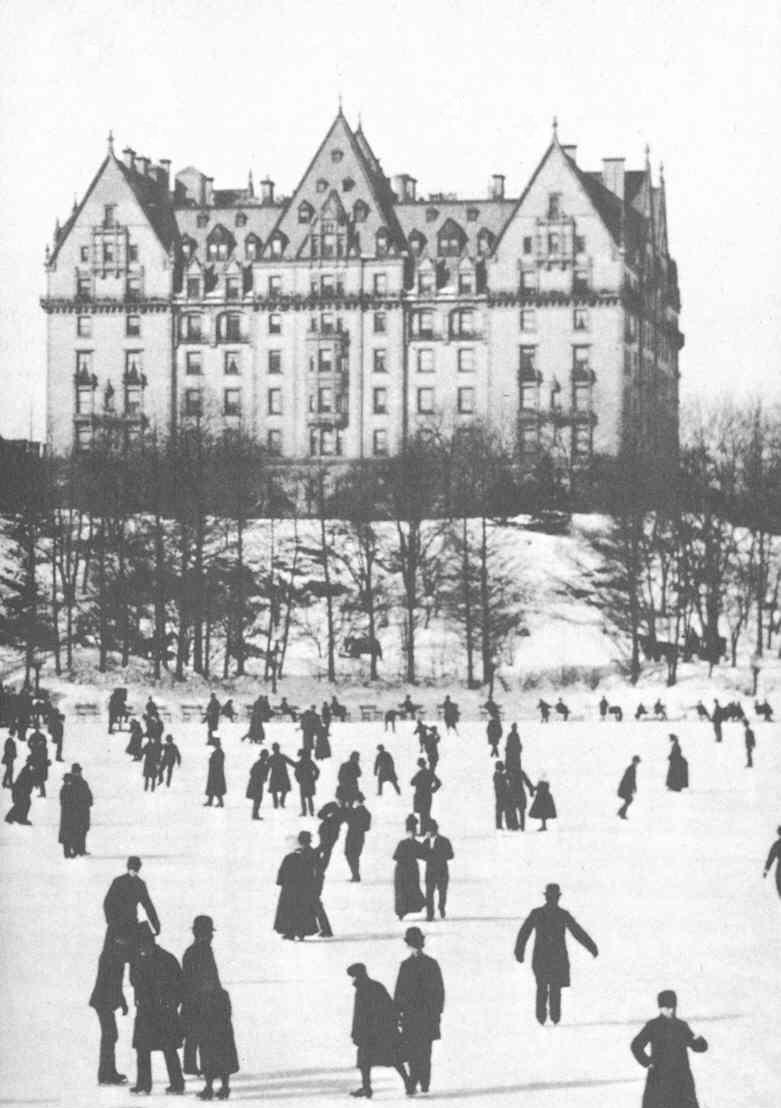
The Dakota, from Central Park Lake (1880s)

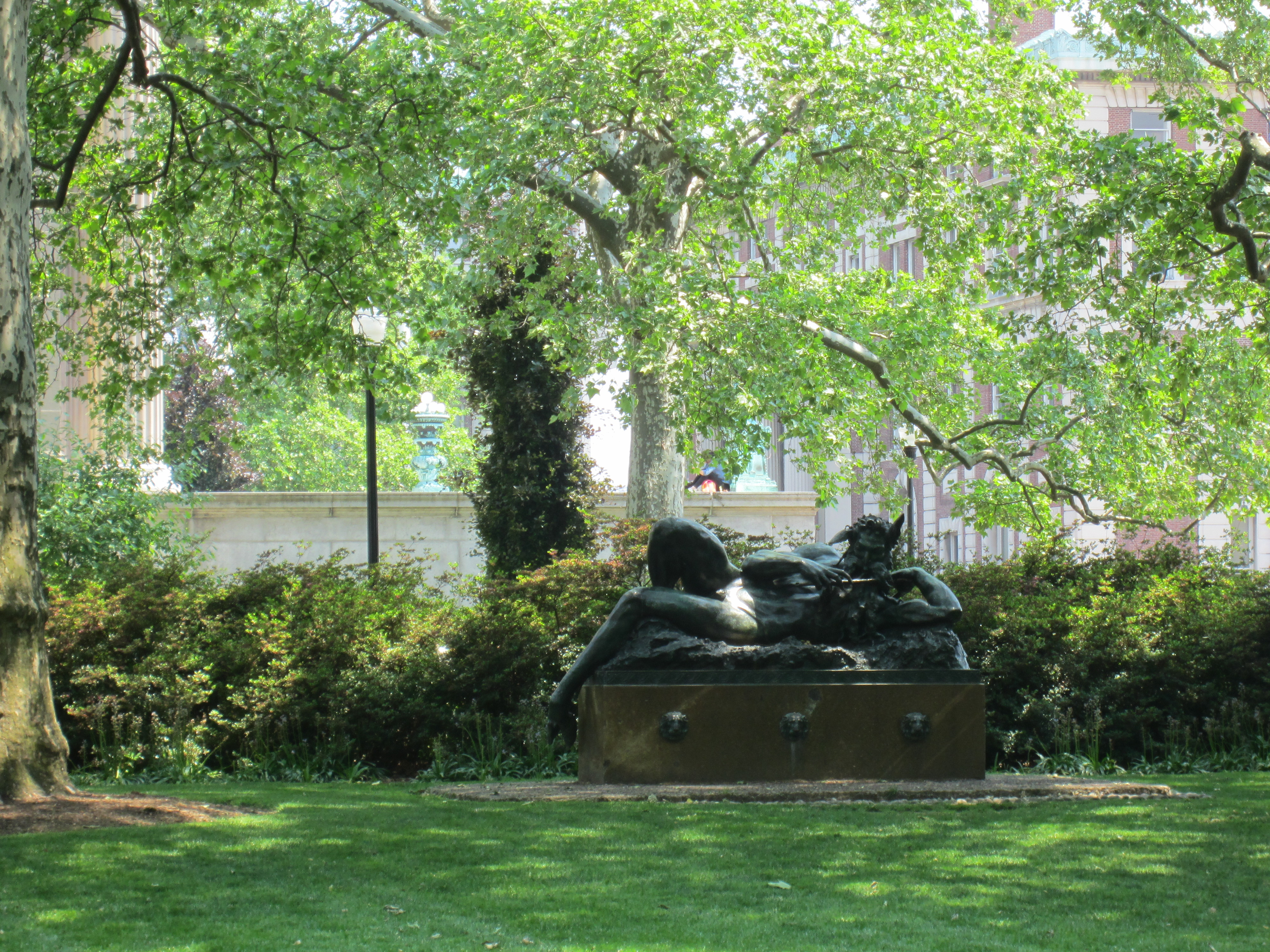
The Great God Pan (1899) by George Grey Barnard, Columbia University

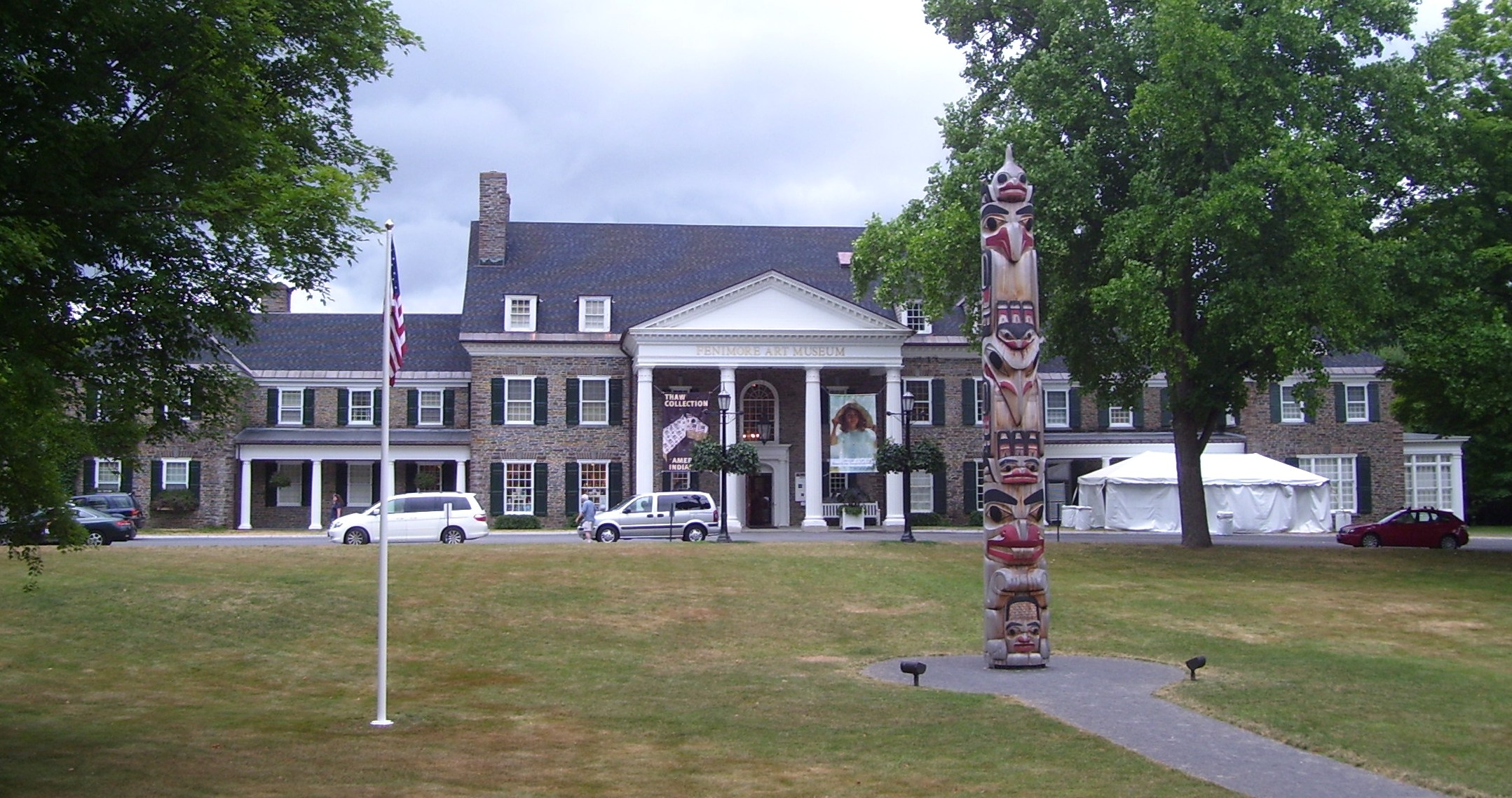
"Fenimore House" (1932), now Fenimore Art Museum, Cooperstown, New York

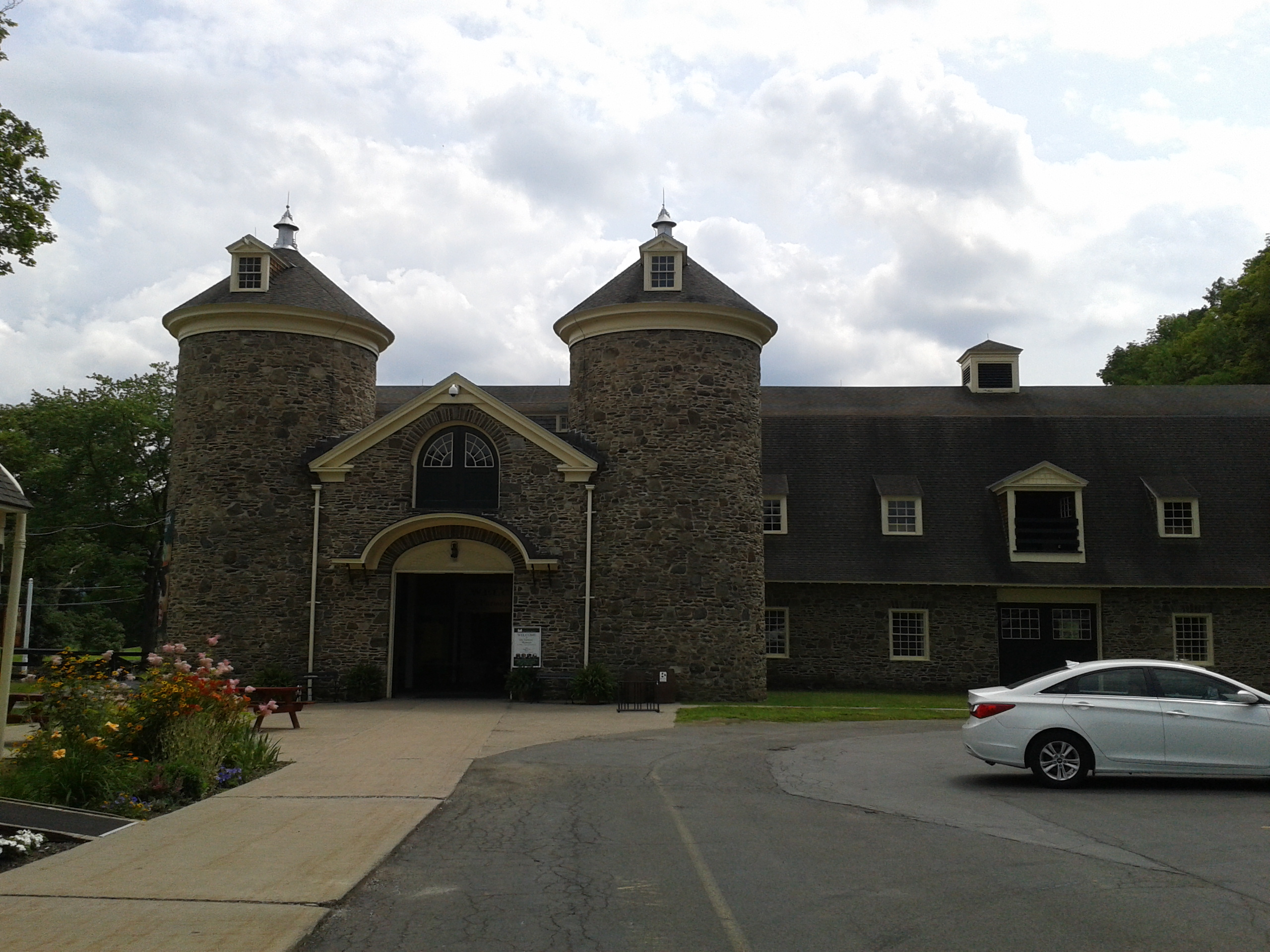
Fenimore Farm & Country Village, Cooperstown, New York
