= Robert Sterling Clark =

American art collector, horse breeder and philanthropist

Sterling Clark
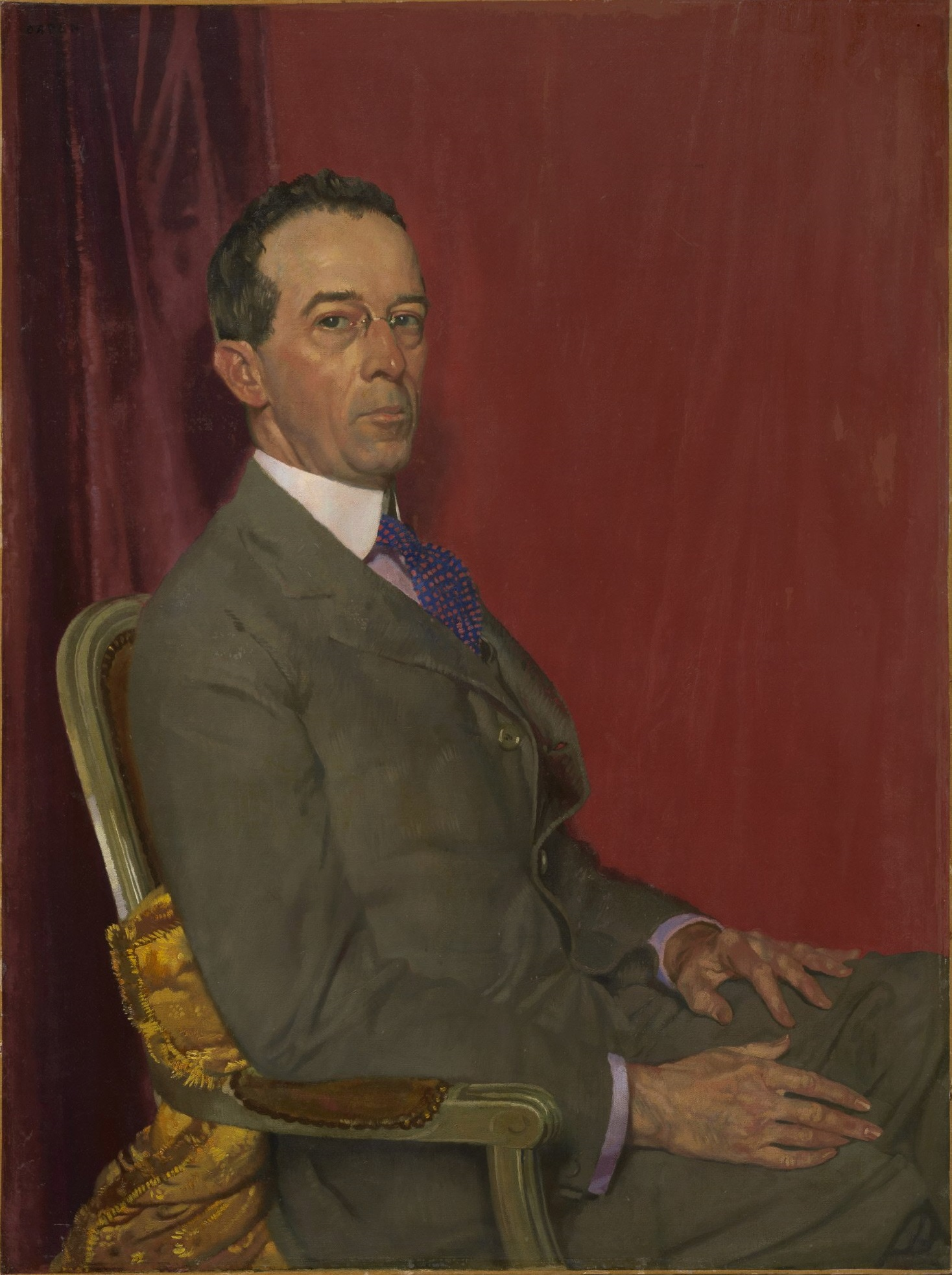
- Portrait of Robert Sterling Clark by William Orpen, (c. 1921–1922)
- Born: Robert Sterling Clark; June 25, 1877; Cooperstown, New York, U.S.
- Died: December 29, 1956 (aged 79); Williamstown, Massachusetts, U.S.
- Education: Yale University (BS)
- Occupations: Art collector, Racehorse owner/breeder, Philanthropist
- Known for: Sterling and Francine Clark Art Institute
- Spouse: Francine Clary
- Parent: Alfred Corning Clark

Robert Sterling Clark (June 25, 1877 – December 29, 1956), an heir to the Singer Sewing Machine fortune, was an American art collector, horse breeder, and philanthropist.

== Biography ==
Known by his middle name, Sterling Clark served in the United States Army in the Philippines and in China during the Boxer Rebellion, where he served under General Smedley Butler. Butler, in 1934, claimed Clark had some connection to the Business Plot, during which a group of rich financiers tried to overthrow United States President Franklin D. Roosevelt and make Butler the nation's dictator in 1933.

Following his graduation from Yale University in 1899 with a degree in engineering, Clark visited Paris, France and over the years would return there frequently, eventually maintaining a residence there. In Paris, he met actress Francine Clary whom he married in 1919.

He owned several residences: New York City, Cooperstown, New York, "Sunridge Farm" in Upperville, Virginia, and Paris, France.

== Art collecting ==
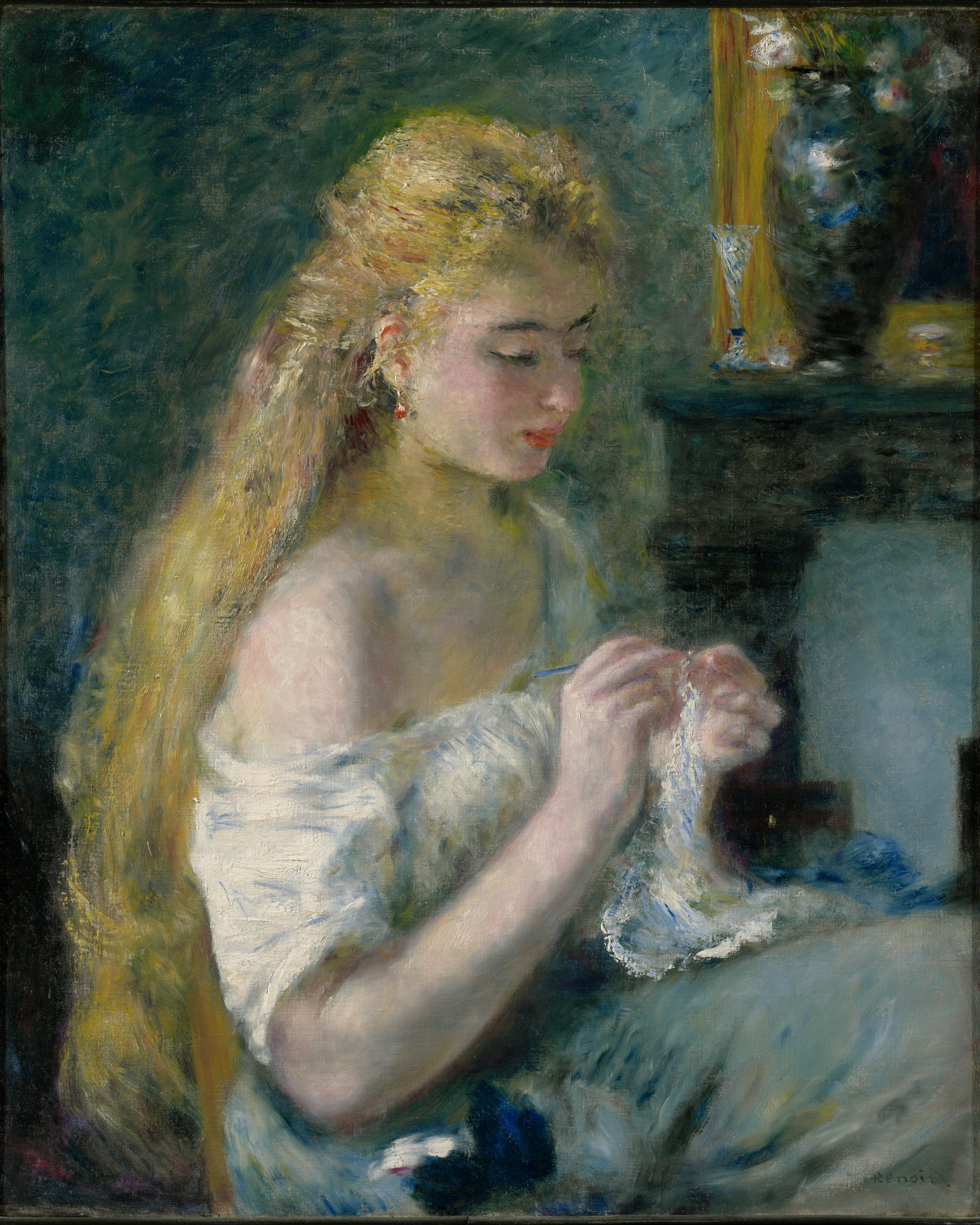
A Girl Crocheting, by Pierre-Auguste Renoir, 1875

Sterling Clark purchased his first Impressionist painting, Pierre-Auguste Renoir's Girl Crocheting, in 1916. He and his wife Francine (1876–1960) continued to collect art rapidly and towards the end of their lives established their collection as a museum near the campus of Williams College in Williamstown, Massachusetts. They did this after originally making plans with his brothers Stephen Carlton Clark and F. Ambrose Clark to combine their collections in a single art museum in Cooperstown.

After a falling out among the brothers, Sterling not only cancelled such plans but also withdrew his share of the family fortune from the collective trust. He established his own foundation and sold off or donated all of his property holdings in Cooperstown. He donated the Ernest Flagg designed neoclassic YMCA building commissioned by his mother, Elizabeth Scriven Clark, in 1898 to the village in 1932, and it now houses village offices, the library and the Cooperstown Art Association. Almost no communication between Stephen and Sterling occurred again.

Over the next five decades he and his wife collected numerous paintings by Renoir, plus dozens of paintings, sculptures and pastels by other Impressionist artists. In 1950, Sterling and Francine Clark chartered the Sterling and Francine Clark Art Institute as a home for their extensive art collection.

The Sterling and Francine Clark Art Institute in Williamstown, Massachusetts opened its doors to the public in 1955. According to Time magazine, "In building their $3,000,000 Sterling and Francine Clark Art Institute, the Clarks ignored costs (Local boosters boast that the marble for the new museum was the biggest single order in Vermont since the U.S. Supreme Court.) but insisted on quality." Works in the collection included over 30 Renoirs as well as Dutch, Spanish and American painters such as Winslow Homer, Goya, Frans Hals, and Degas.

== 1909 Expedition ==
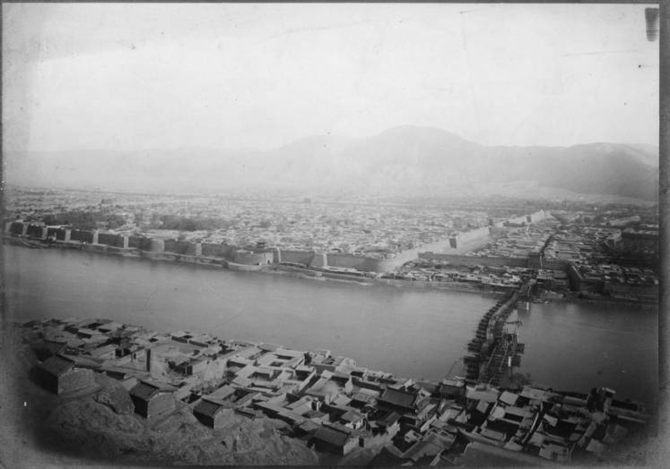
Lanzhou and the Zhongshan Bridge under construction, taken by Clark in 1909

He financed a 1909 Expedition which sought specimens from the Yellow River into Shaanxi and then to Gansu provinces of China. He recruited the explorer Arthur de Carle Sowerby as naturalist for the trip, later publishing a book with Sowerby about the expedition entitled Through Shên-kan: the account of the Clark expedition in north China, 1908-9.

He established the Robert Sterling Clark Foundation which operates today from offices at 135 East 64th St., New York City.

== Horse racing interests ==
Clark raced horses in the United States and in Europe. In the United States, his filly, Current, was voted the 1928 retrospective American Champion Two-Year-Old Filly, whilst in England Galatea II won the 1000 Guineas and Oaks in 1939. The most noted horse owned and bred by Clark was Never Say Die (1951–1975), a Kentucky bred chestnut colt, though conceived in Ireland, before being shipped 'in utero' to Jonabell Farm, Lexington, where Clark's breeding activities were centred. Raced in England, he won the 1954 Epsom Derby at odds of at 33 to 1. He was ridden by 18-year-old Lester Piggott, the youngest jockey to ever win the Derby. Never Say Die also won the Rosslyn Stakes (ENG) and St. Leger Stakes (Gr.1). Upon retirement, Clark gifted the horse to the National Stud.

Following his marriage, Clark's interest in horses waned considerably. Yet during his lifetime he was known as a successful horse owner rather than as the art collector he's known as today.

== See also ==
- Business Plot
