= Susan Fenimore Cooper =

American writer and amateur naturalist (1813–1894)

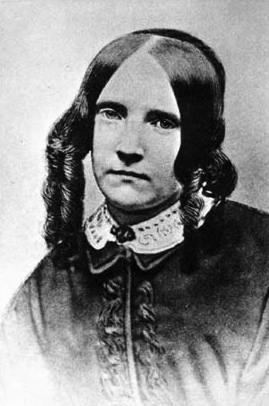
- Cooper in the 1850s
- Born: Susan Augusta Fenimore Cooper; April 17, 1813; Scarsdale, New York, United States
- Died: December 31, 1894 (aged 81); Cooperstown, New York, United States
- Occupations: Writer, founder of orphanage
- Relatives: James Fenimore Cooper (father); William Cooper (grandfather)
- Writing career
- Language: English
- Period: 19th century
- Genres: Fiction and natural history

Susan Augusta Fenimore Cooper (April 17, 1813 – December 31, 1894) was an American writer and amateur naturalist. She founded an orphanage in Cooperstown, New York and made it a successful charity. The daughter of writer James Fenimore Cooper, she served as his secretary and amanuensis late in his life.

== Early life, education and charity work ==
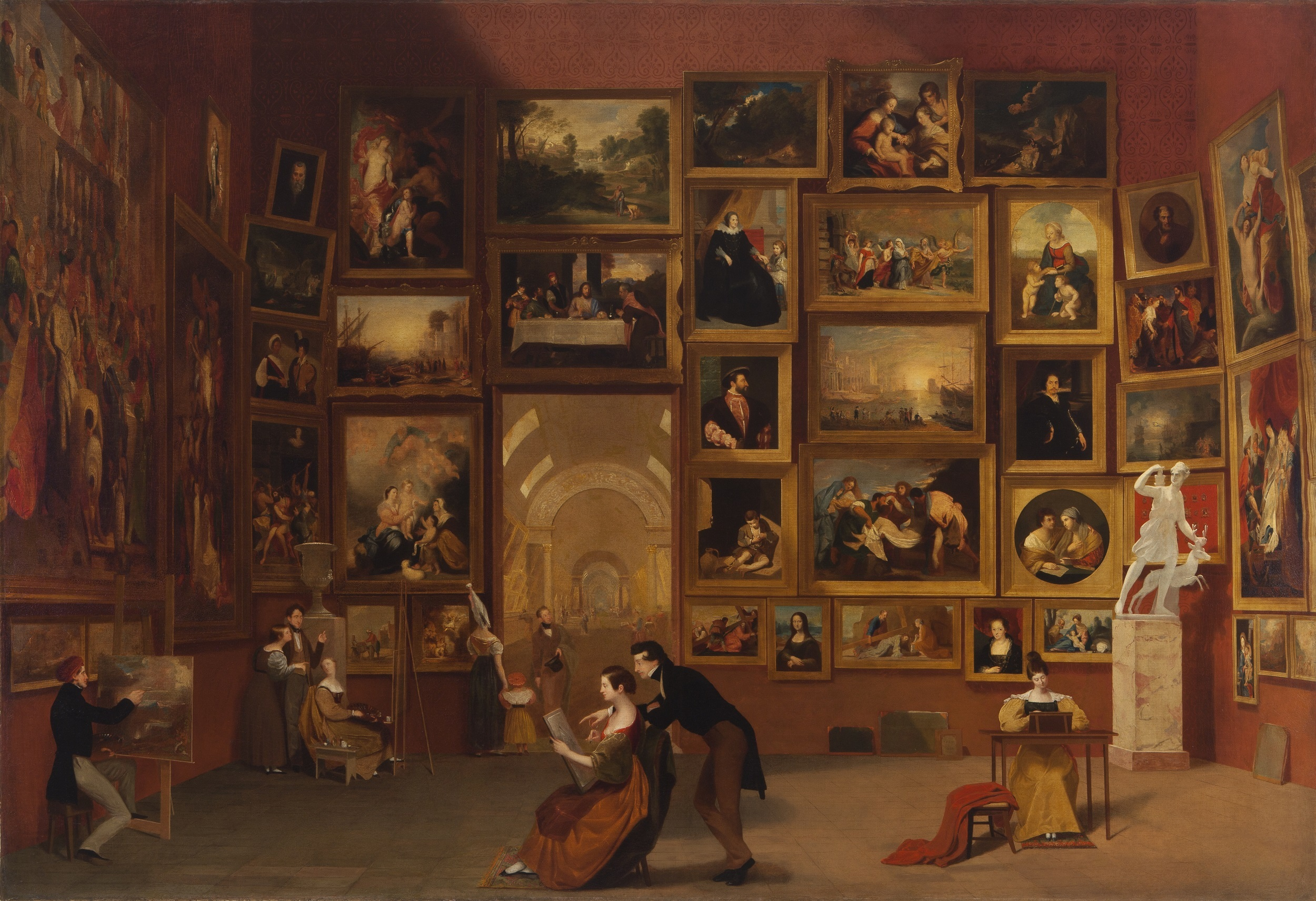
Susan and her father are amongst those depicted in the painting Gallery of the Louvre by Samuel Morse, 1833

Susan Fenimore Cooper was born in 1813 in Scarsdale, New York, the daughter of the novelist James Fenimore Cooper and his wife Susan Augusta DeLancey. She was his second child, and the eldest to survive her youth. As a child, Cooper studied in European schools when she traveled with her family to live there. She sometimes travelled with her father and assisted in documenting and organizing his notes. Much of her life was devoted to him, and he encouraged her practice of art and writing. She also published a great deal herself.

In 1868, Cooper was one of the founding members of Thanksgiving Hospital.

In 1873, she founded an orphanage in Cooperstown, New York, the town founded by her paternal grandfather William Cooper and where she and her family had lived most of her adult life. Under her superintendence the orphanage became a prosperous charitable institution. It was begun in a modest house in a small way with five pupils; in 1900 the building, which was erected in 1883, sheltered ninety boys and girls. The orphans were taken when quite young, were fed, clothed, and given a basic education. When they were old enough, they were helped to find positions in "good Christian families". Some of them before leaving were taught to earn their own living.

In 1886, Cooper established The Friendly Society. Every woman on becoming a member of the Society chose one of the girls in the orphanage to give individual attention.

During the later years of her father's life, she became his secretary and amanuensis, and but for her father's prohibition would probably have become his biographer.

== Authorship ==
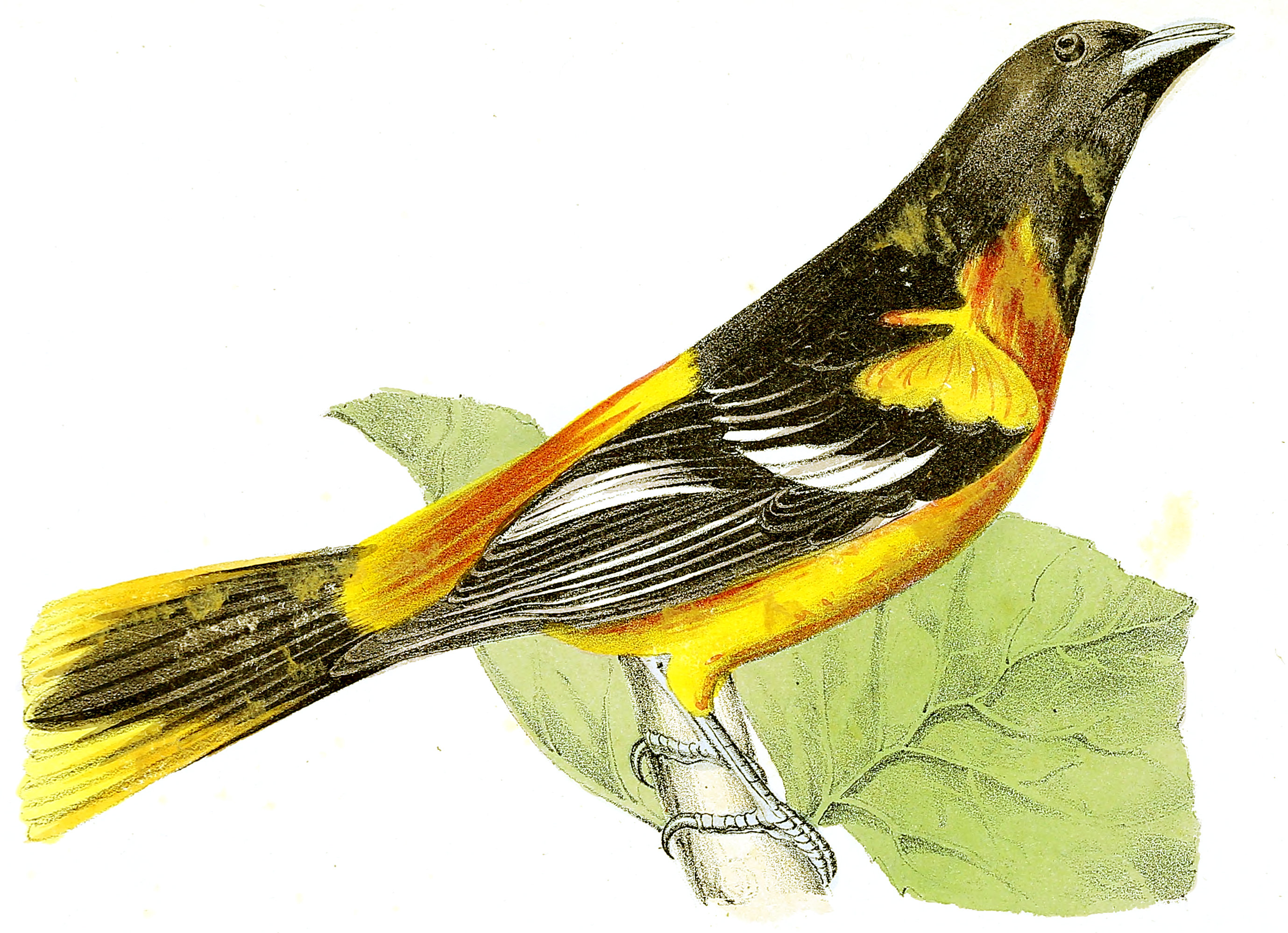
Watercolor of golden oriole by Susan Fenimore Cooper, from Rural Hours, 1851.

Cooper was a writer who published on diverse subjects, but she is best remembered as a nature writer. She kept a diary that formed the basis of her second book, Rural Hours (1850), published anonymously as "by a lady" and offering a sharp-eyed account of rural life in New York. Cooper wrote many more essays, and edited two more volumes, on country life, but Rural Hours was the most successful, going through nine editions over the course of nearly forty years; it then appeared in 1887 in a severely abridged form (40% of the text is cut), in spite of Cooper's desire that it remain in its full form. Rural Hours was a remarkable accomplishment for Cooper because when it was published not many women wrote about natural history. It wasn't until the late 19th century when women's natural history writing took off. What set Rural Hours apart from the previous books written by her father and grandfather was Susan's remarkable attention to detail and accuracy in natural historical observations, and explicit call for preservation of the Otsego forests. It is noteworthy that this prescient call for forest preservation was published four years prior to Walden, 14 years prior to George Perkins Marsh's man and nature; or Physical geography as modified by human action (1864), two books recognized as among the earliest call for the preservation of American forests. Cooper also wrote an essay in the form of a letter about women's suffrage and a novel, Elinor Wyllys.

In recent years, beginning with the 1998 republication of Rural Hours, Cooper has begun to achieve recognition as a significant writer in her own right. Rural Hours in particular has been called the "first major work of environmental literary nonfiction by an American woman writer, both a source and a rival of Thoreau's Walden". This book went through six editions and the last one was published in 1887; it was formed through a daily diary kept by Cooper and included lengthy discussions of nature, drawings of birds native to her dwelling area as well as flowers and other plants. Both Susan and her works were unique for their time; this book was nearly scientific with its descriptive details of the specimens she studied, both visually and lingually. She had a basic knowledge of botany and spent a significant amount of her life in charitable pursuits.

Although Cooper was considered an amateur, Rural Hours caught the eye of scientist Charles Darwin and author Henry David Thoreau. In a letter to Asa Gray, Darwin wrote "Talking of books, I am in middle of one which pleases me... 'Miss Cooper's Journal of a Naturalist.' Who is she? She seems a very clever woman & gives a capital account of the battle between our & your weeds".

According to a journal kept by Henry David Thoreau, he read part of Rural Hours and circumstantial evidence suggests that some of the most memorable passages from Thoreau's 1854 book Walden may have been suggested by several of Cooper's own passages on loons, wild berries, the perceived bottomlessness of the lake, and the seasonal breaking of the ice.

== Artwork ==
Cooper showed great interest in art and studied it in Europe. While some writers today, such as Jack Kramer, claim that the plates in illustrated edition of Rural Hours were by Cooper, no evidence to that effect remains.

Illustrated edition of "Rural Hours" (click to browse)

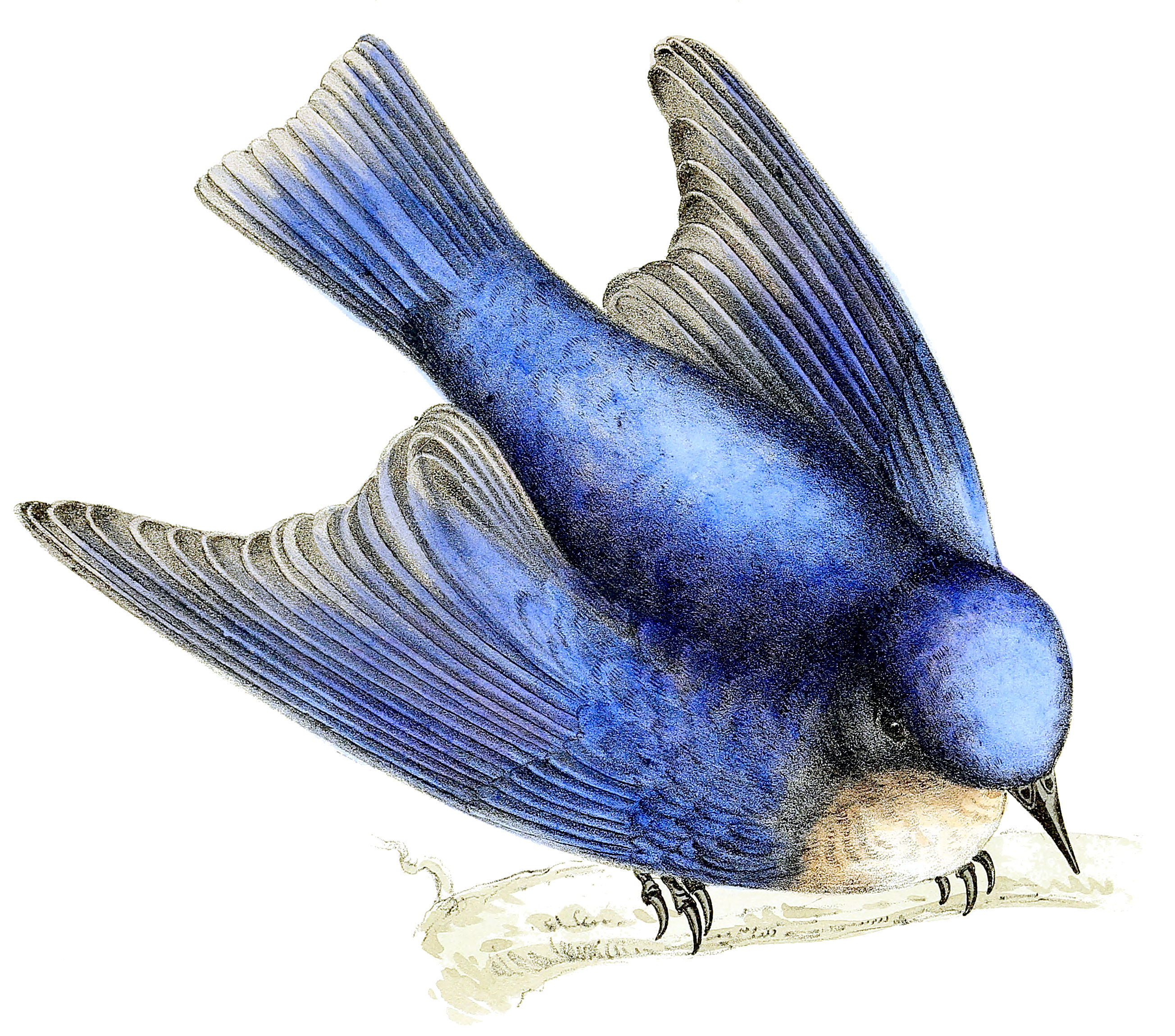

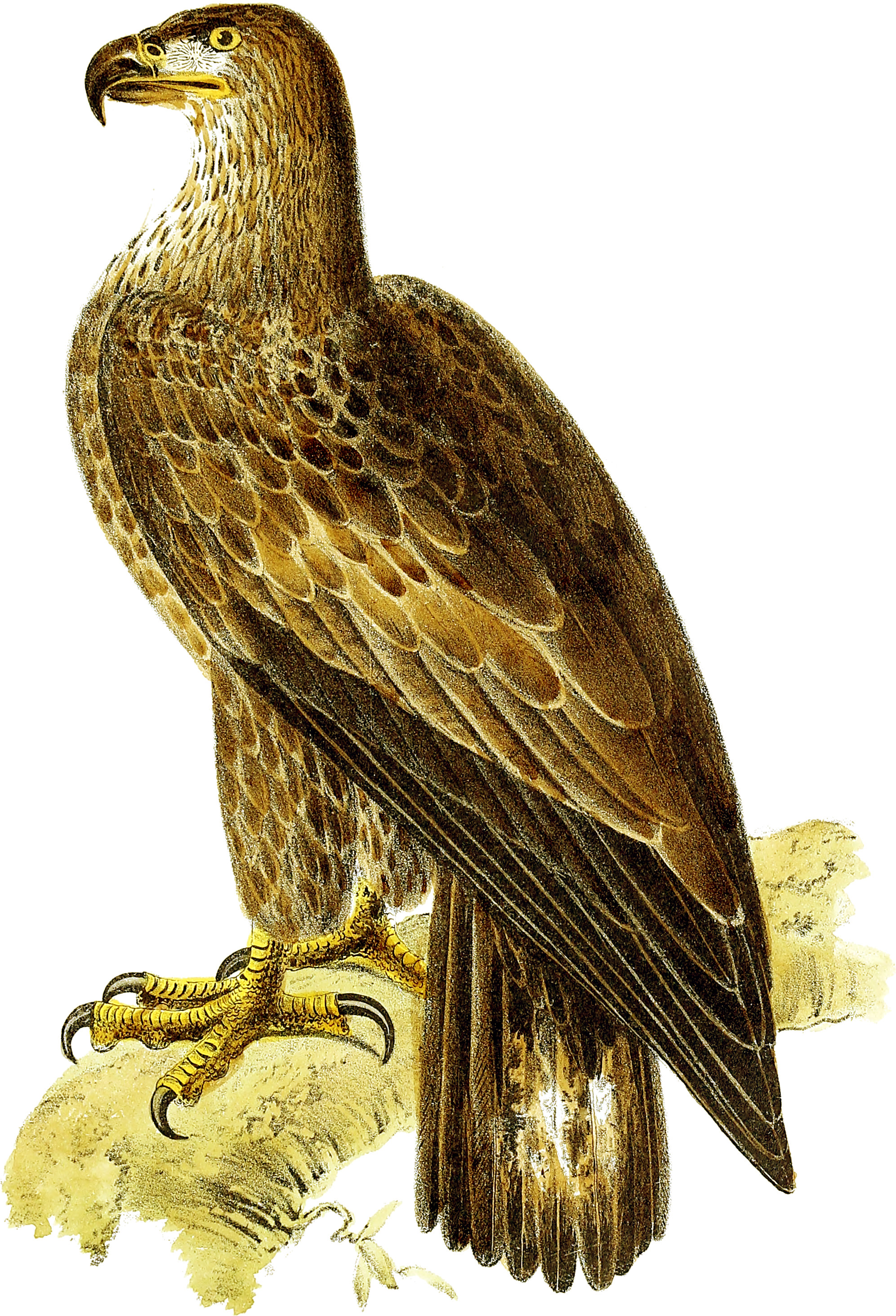

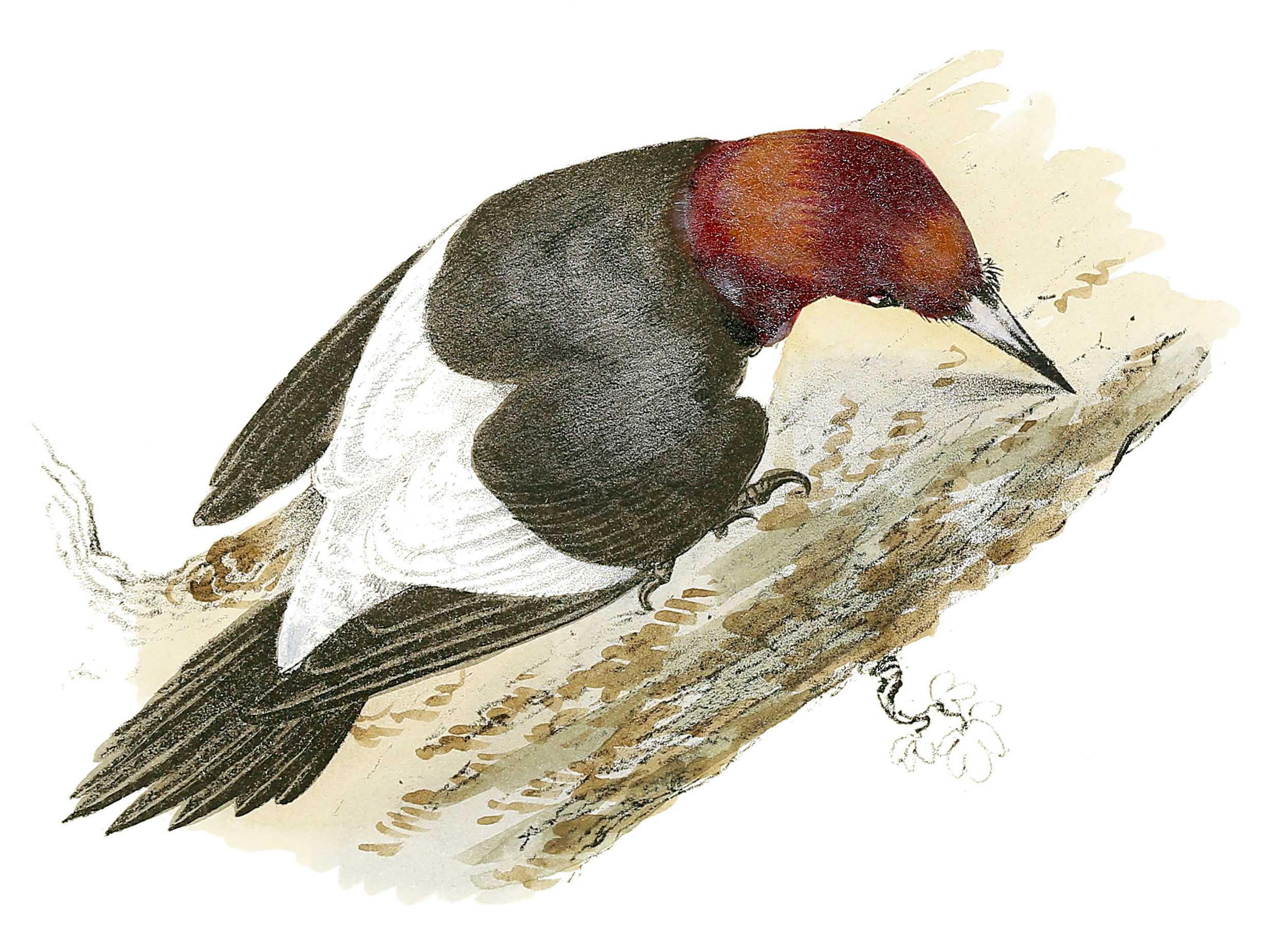

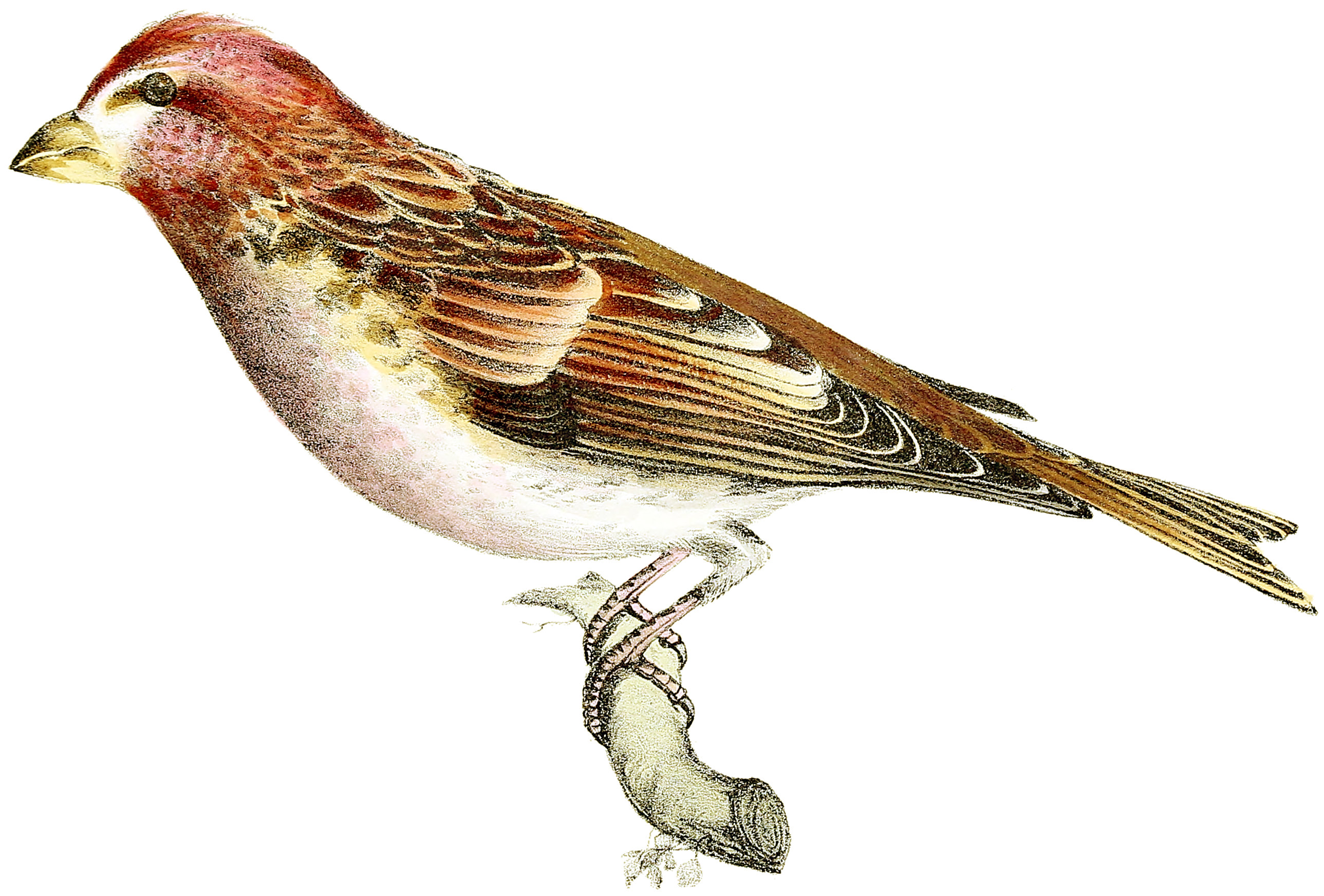

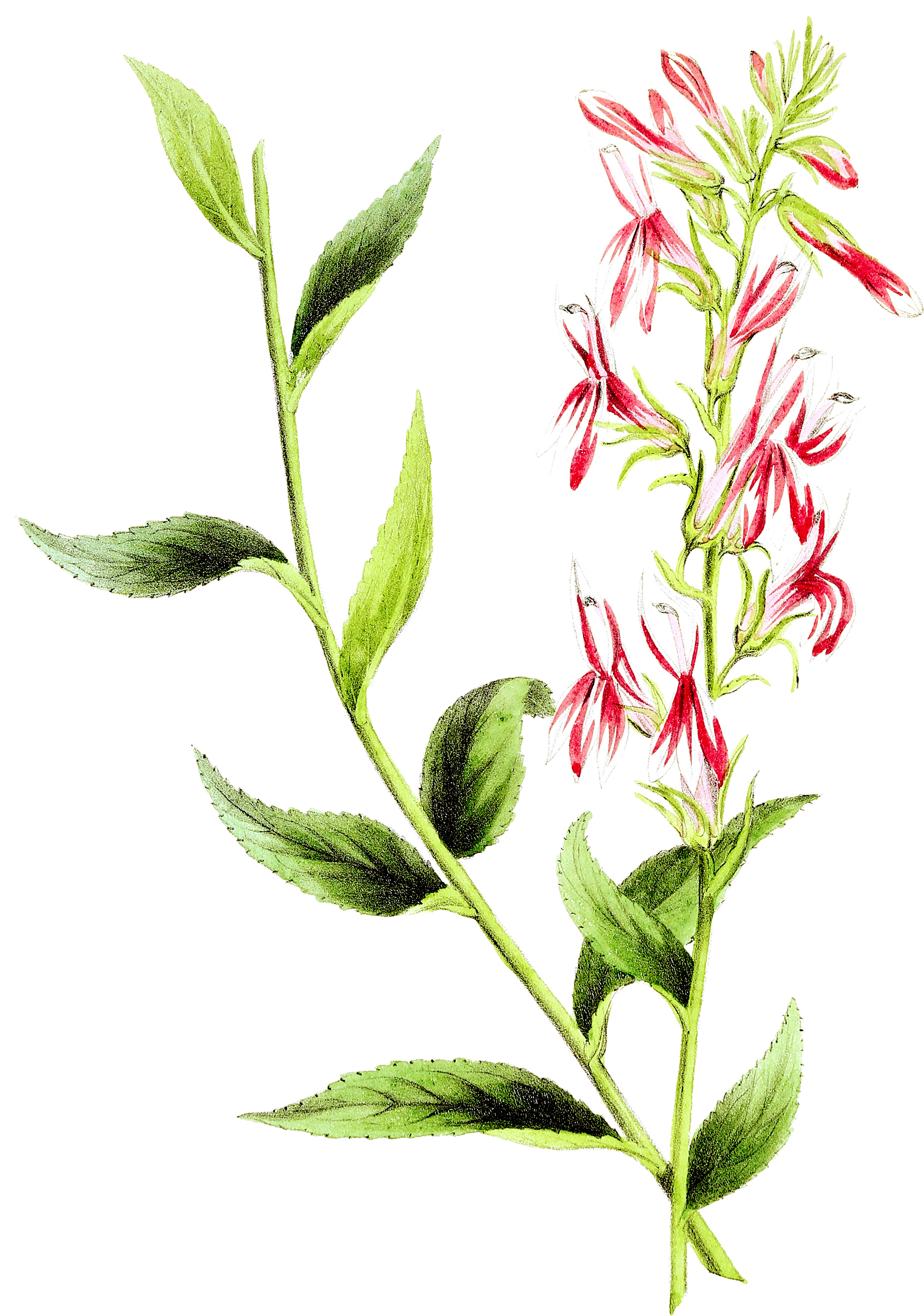

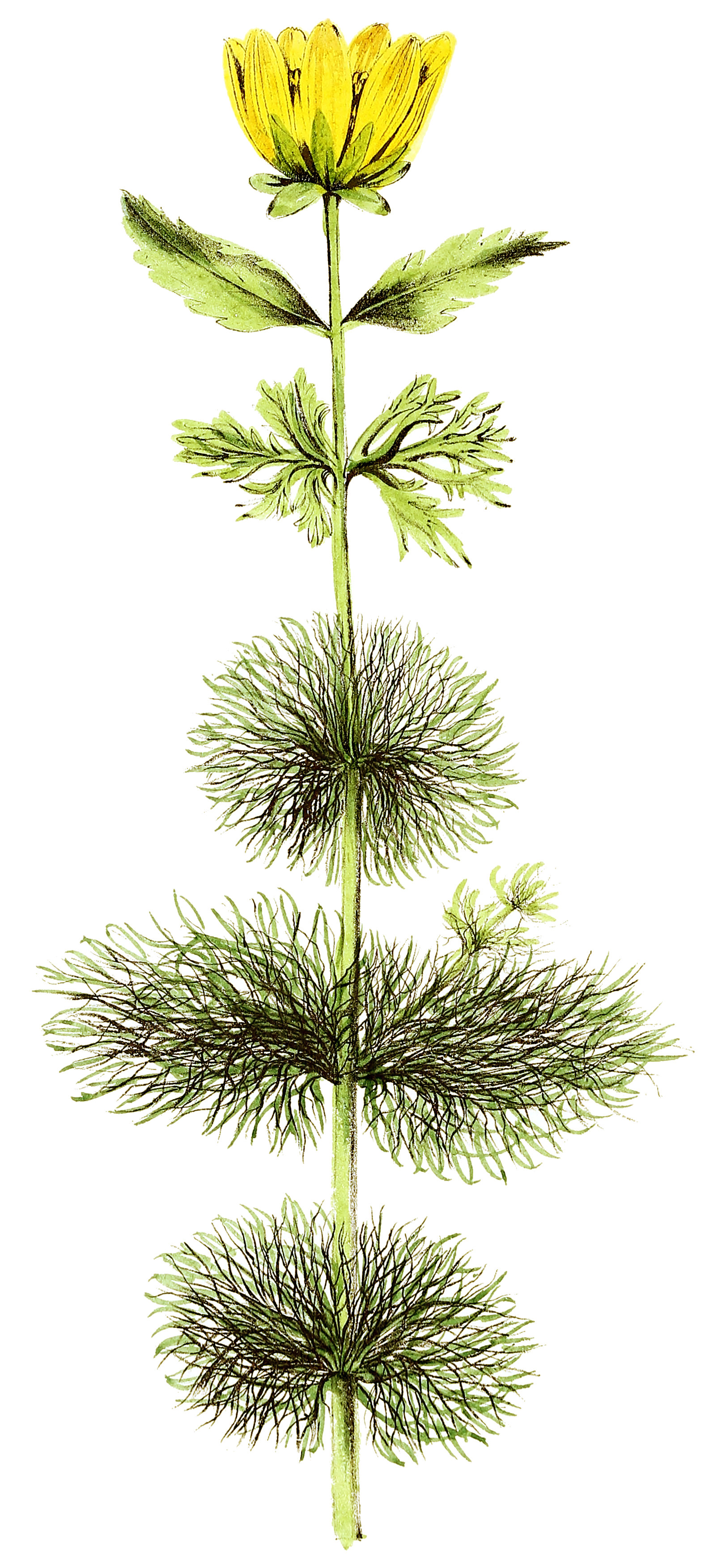

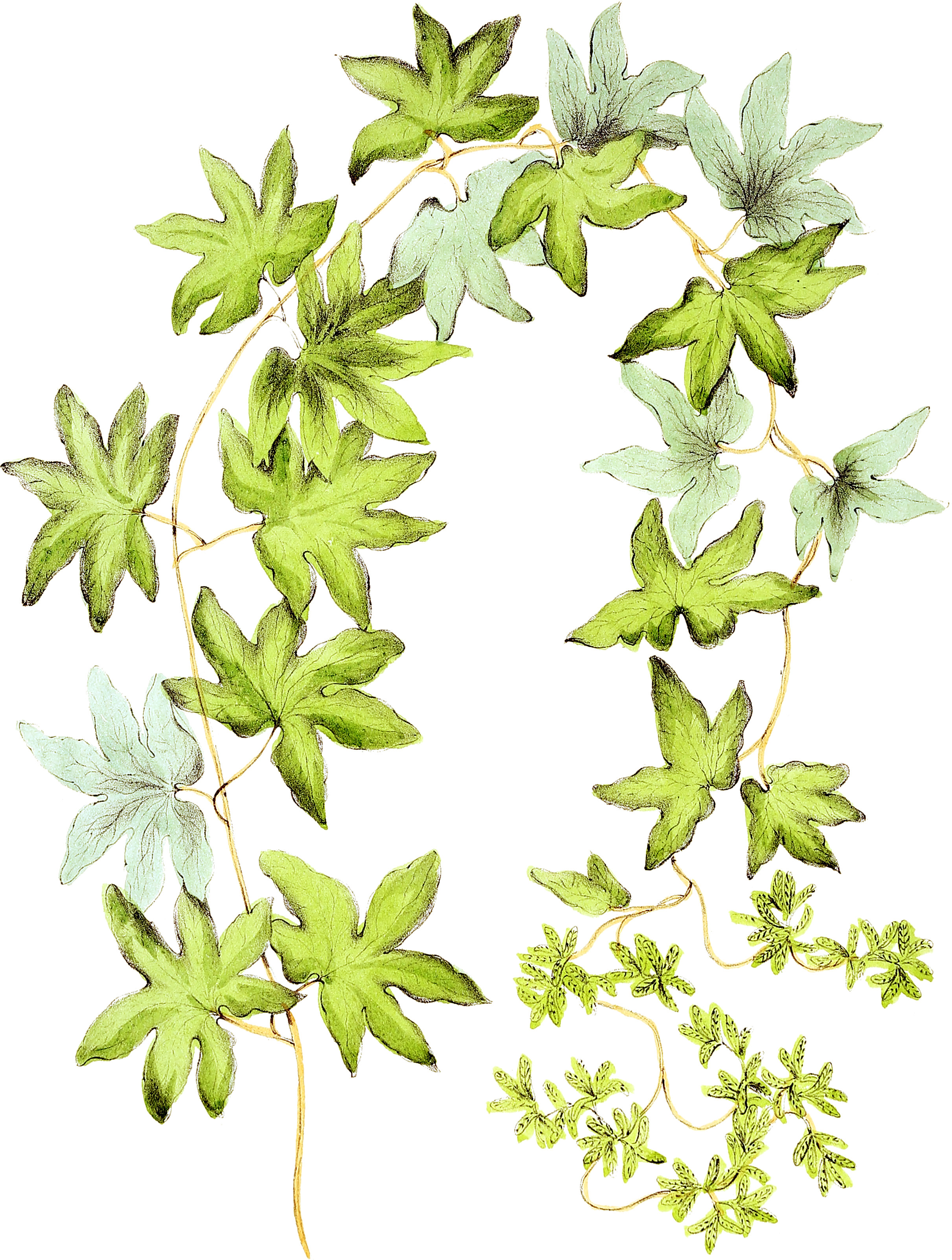

== Personal life ==
The home she and her sister shared was built mainly with bricks and materials from the ruins of Otsego Hall in Cooperstown, which her paternal grandfather had built and where her parents had also lived. Cooper never married or raised a family of her own but was able to become an accomplished naturalist of her time, despite the lack of opportunity for women to publish written works or art pieces during this time. She died in her sleep, age 81, in Cooperstown.

== Bibliography ==
- Elinor Wyllys – A Tale, a novel (ed. by James Fenimore Cooper). 1845. London: Richard Bentley. OCLC 11850952.
- Rural Hours, a nature diary of Cooperstown, New York, 1850. New York City: George Palmer Putnam. OCLC 428430990.
- The Lumley Autograph (1851, satirical essay)
- Country Rambles in England; or, Journal of a Naturalist, written by John Leonard Knapp, Notes and Additions by Susan Fenimore Cooper (1853)
- The Journal of a Naturalist, English edition of Rural Hours (1855)
- Mt. Vernon: A Letter to the Children of America (1859)
- Female Suffrage: A Letter to the Christian Women of America (1870)
- Rhyme and Reason of Country Life (1885)
- Rural Hours. Boston and New York City: Houghton, Mifflin, 1887, at A Celebration of Women Writers

== See also ==
- List of novelists from the United States
- List of people from New York
