= Cooperstown, New York =

- Village
- Village of Cooperstown
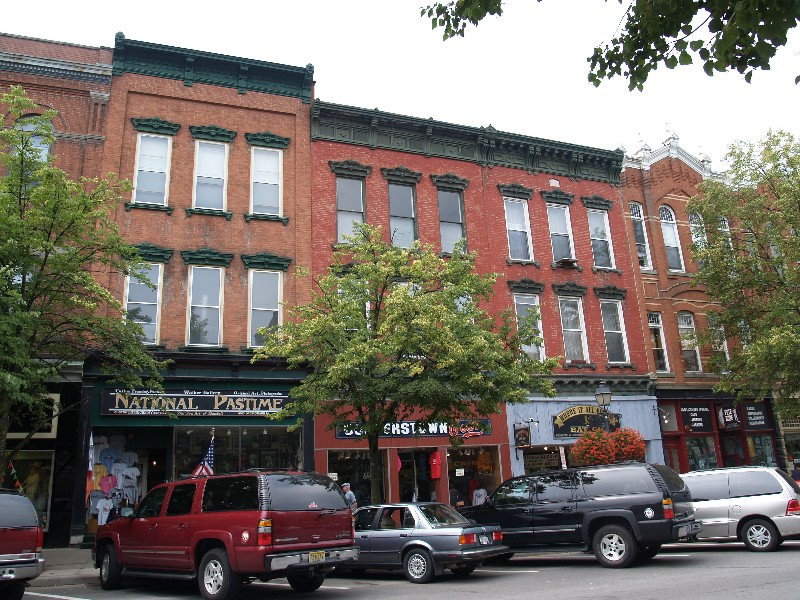
- Main Street, part of the Cooperstown Historic District

- Location in the state of New York Cooperstown (the United States)
- Coordinates: 42°41′50″N 74°55′37″W
- Country: United States
- State: New York
- County: Otsego
- Town: Otsego

Government
  - Mayor: Ellen Tillapaugh

Area
  - Total: 1.85 sq mi (4.78 km^{2})
  - Land: 1.63 sq mi (4.23 km^{2})
  - Water: 0.21 sq mi (0.54 km^{2})
- Elevation: 1,227 ft (374 m)

Population (2020)
  - Total: 1,794
  - Density: 1,097.5/sq mi (423.74/km^{2})
- Time zone: UTC−5 (Eastern (EST))
  - Summer (DST): UTC−4 (EDT)
- ZIP Code: 13326
- Area code: 607
- FIPS code: 36-18047
- GNIS feature ID: 0979671
- Website: https://cooperstownny.gov/

Cooperstown is a village in and the county seat of Otsego County, New York, United States. Most of the village lies within the town of Otsego, but some of the eastern part is in the town of Middlefield. Located at the foot of Otsego Lake in the Central New York Region, Cooperstown is approximately 60 miles (97 kilometers) west of Albany, 67 mi (108 km) southeast of Syracuse and 145 mi (233 km) northwest of New York City. The population of the village was 1,794 as of the 2020 census.

Cooperstown is the home of the National Baseball Hall of Fame and Museum. Other attractions in the village include the Fenimore Farm & Country Village, which opened in 1944 on farmland that had once belonged to James Fenimore Cooper, the Fenimore Art Museum, and the Glimmerglass Festival. Most of the historic pre-1900s core of the village is included in the Cooperstown Historic District, which was listed on the National Register of Historic Places in 1980; its boundaries were increased in 1997 and more contributing properties were identified.

== History ==
=== Native American use ===
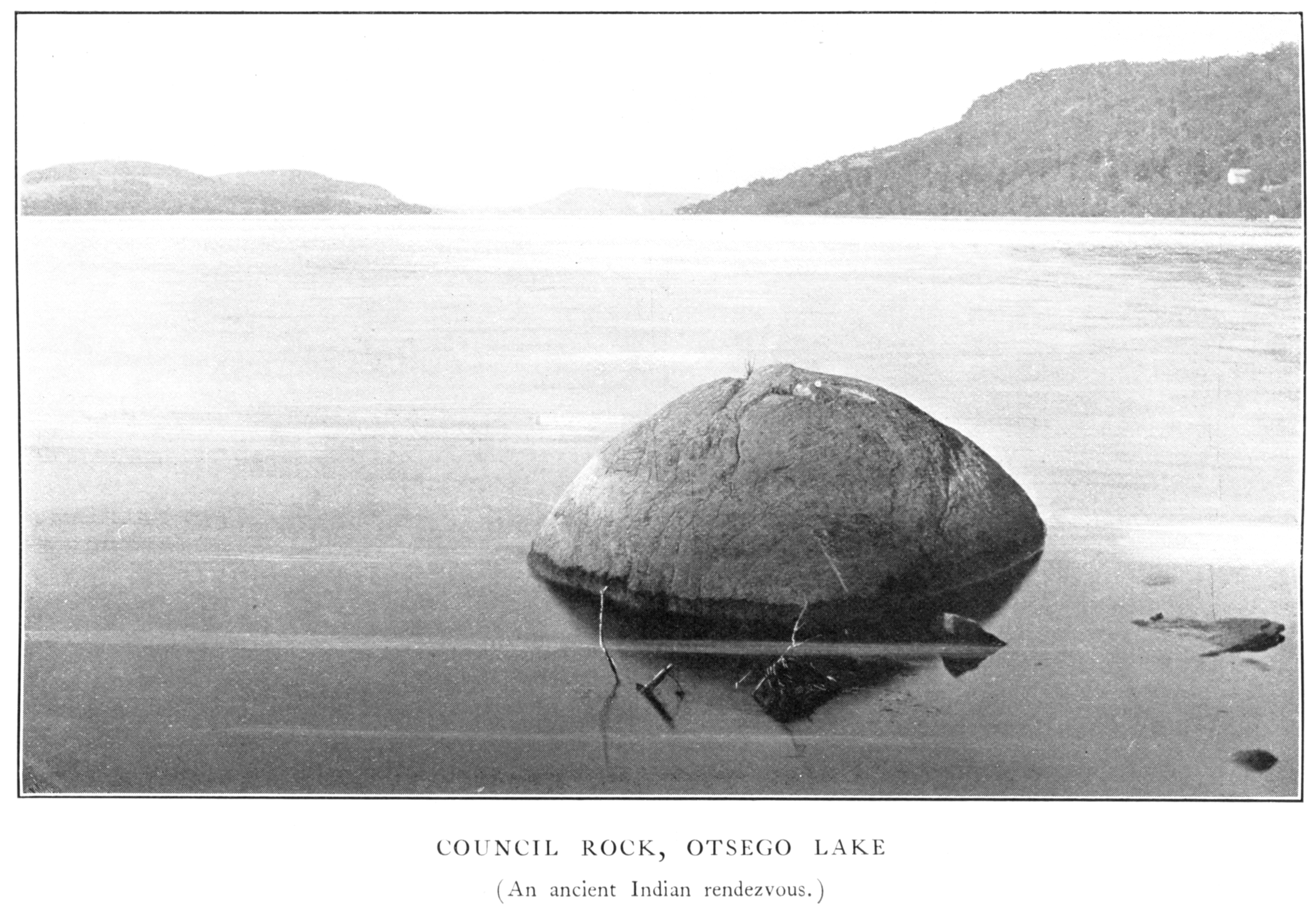
Council Rock

Before European colonization, Iroquois Indians inhabited the area around the village and Otsego Lake. The name Otsego is from a Mohawk or Oneida word meaning "place of the rock", referring to the large boulder near the lake's outlet, today known as "Council Rock". It is a large boulder whose top is above the water's surface and can be seen from shore. It is believed to have been a meeting place for Native Americans prior to the American Revolutionary War. A small parcel of land near Council Rock was presented to the Village of Cooperstown in 1957, on the condition that it remain open to the public as a park.

=== Settlement ===
The village was developed within part of the Cooper Patent, which William Cooper – who later became a county judge – purchased in 1785 from Colonel George Croghan, former Deputy to Sir William Johnson, British Superintendent of Indian Affairs of the Northern District. The land amounted to 10,000 acres (40 km^{2}). William Cooper founded a village on Otsego Lake. His son, James Fenimore Cooper, grew up in the frontier town. He later became a noted American author with The Leatherstocking Tales, a series of novels that includes The Last of the Mohicans.

Cooper established the village of Cooperstown in 1786, laid out by surveyor William Ellison. At the time, the area was part of Montgomery County. It was incorporated as the "Village of Otsego" on April 3, 1807. The name was changed to "Village of Cooperstown" June 12, 1812, after the founder. William Cooper was appointed as a county judge in the late 18th century and was elected to the state assembly from Otsego County.

Cooperstown is one of only twelve villages in New York still incorporated under a charter, the other villages having incorporated or re-incorporated under the provisions of Village Law.

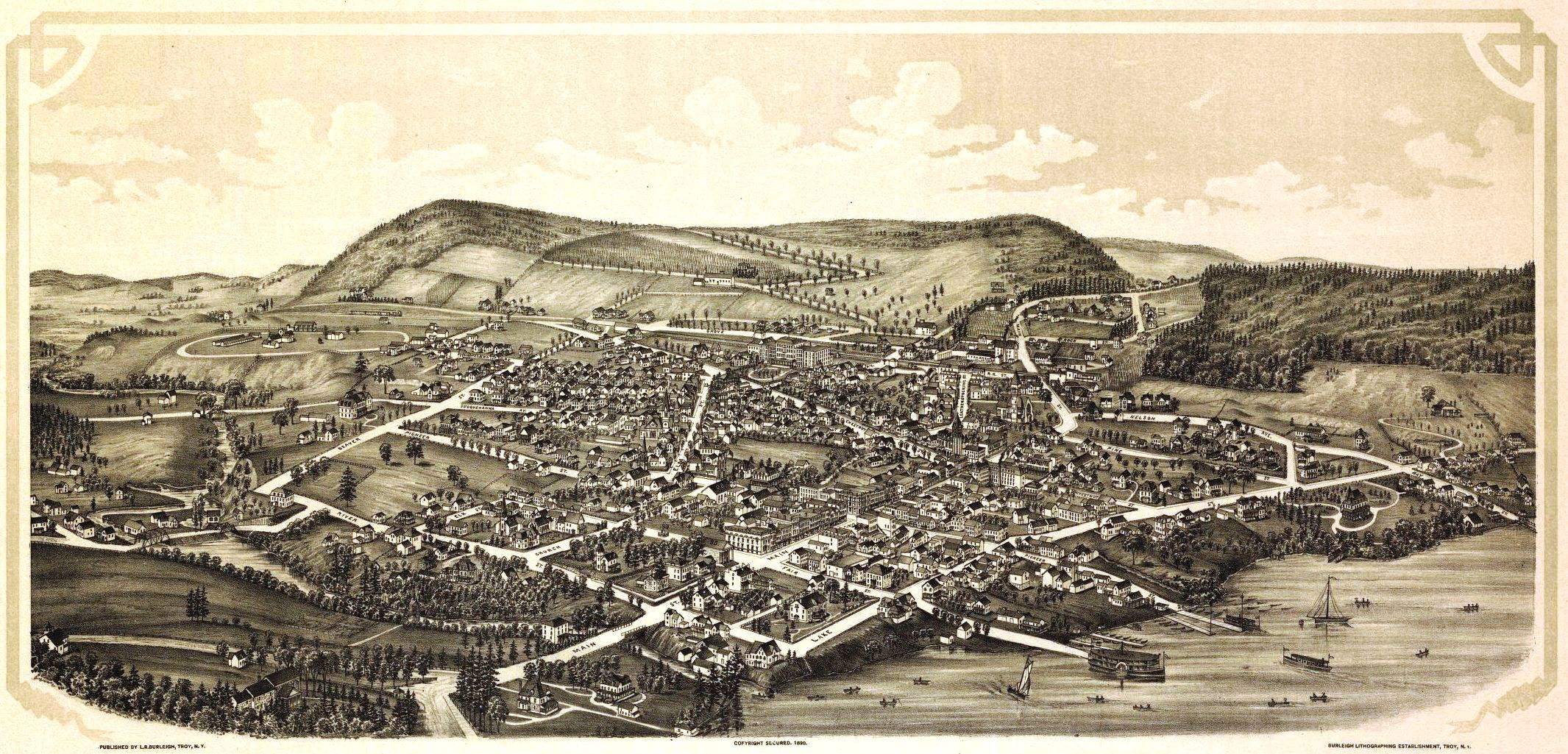
Cooperstown depicted on an 1890 panoramic map

=== Cooperstown today ===
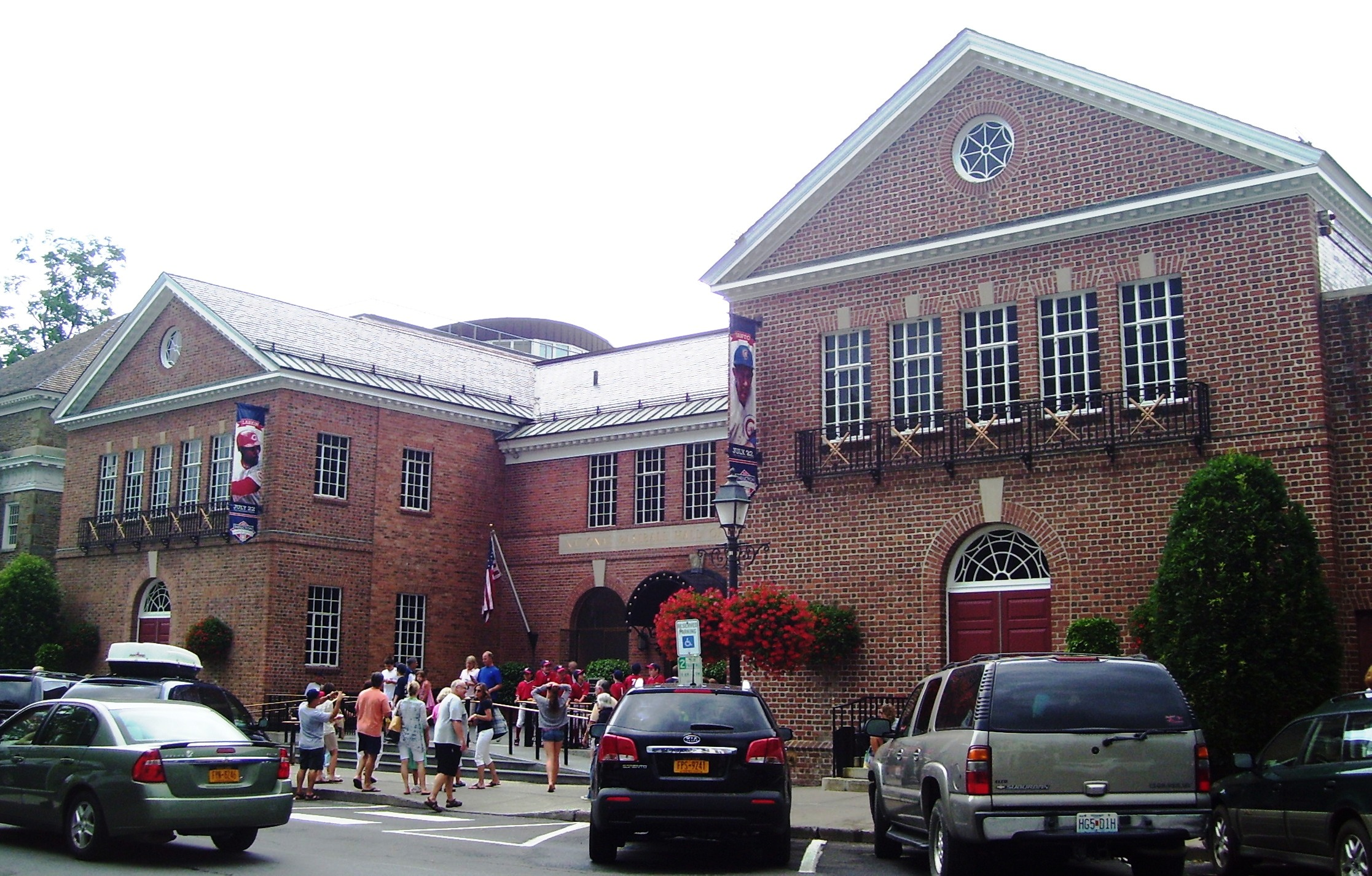
Entrance to the National Baseball Hall of Fame and Museum

Cooperstown is best known as the home of the National Baseball Hall of Fame and Museum, which was founded in 1939 by Stephen Carlton Clark. According to an interview conducted in 1906 by the Mills Commission, nearby resident Abner Graves attributed the game's invention to his deceased friend, Abner Doubleday. Graves stated that Doubleday invented baseball on a cow pasture within the village in 1839, the present site of Doubleday Field, but this claim is universally discounted by baseball historians.

Once known as the "Village of Museums", until the 1970s Cooperstown also boasted the Indian Museum (adjacent to Lakefront Park), The Carriage and Harness Museum (displaying a world-class collection primarily from F. Ambrose Clark's estate; now the Bassett Hospital offices on Elk Street), and The Woodland Museum near Three Mile Point. The latter, opened in 1962 by heirs to the Anheuser-Busch company, folded in 1974. It ran a close third in annual attendance to the Hall of Fame and Fenimore Farm & Country Village.

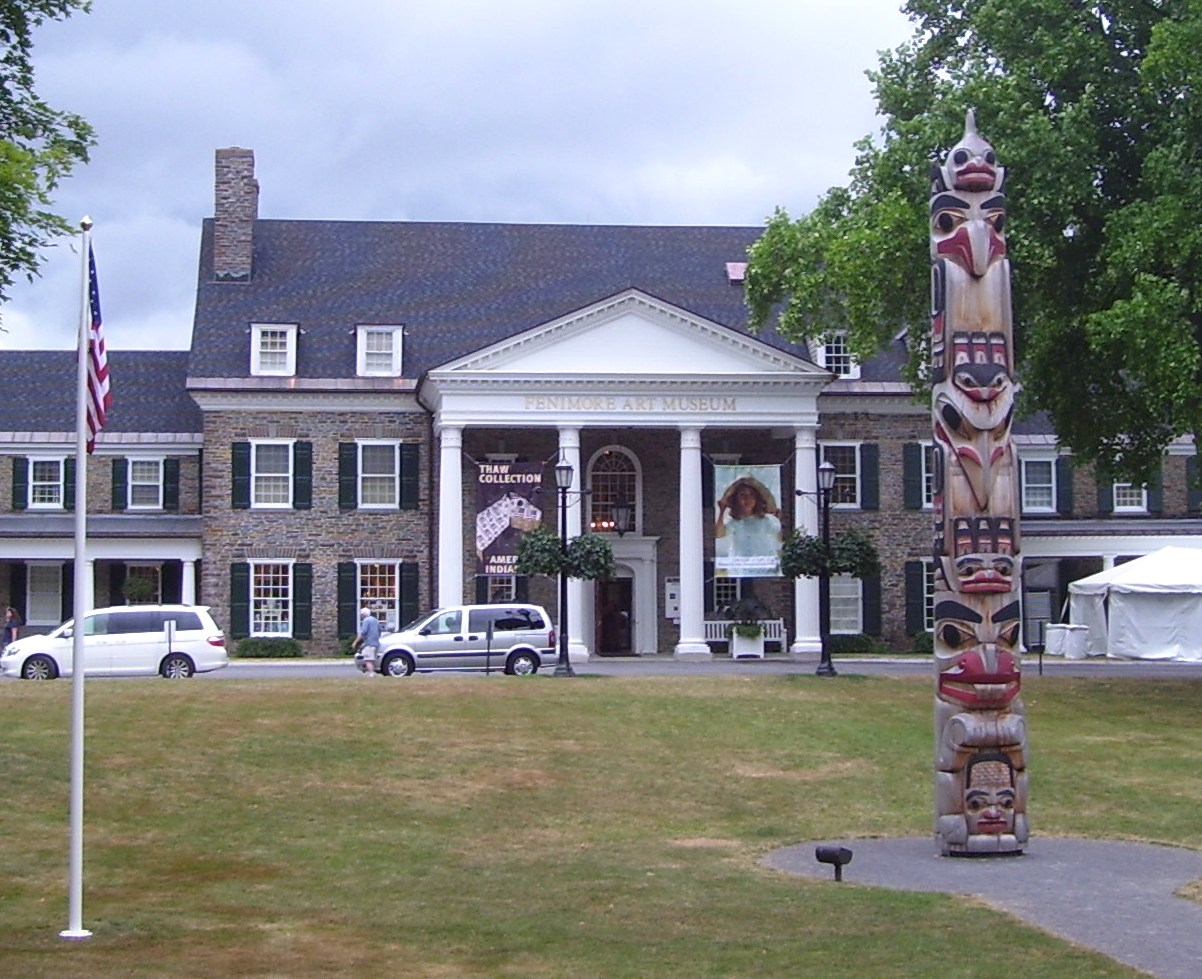
The Fenimore Art Museum

The Cooperstown Historic District, Glimmerglass Historic District, Middlefield District No. 1 School, Fly Creek Historic District, Otsego County Courthouse, and United States Post Office are listed on the National Register of Historic Places.

=== Business district ===
Superficially, the downtown commercial district looks not unlike it did in the 1970s. It has undergone significant change since the late 20th century.

Through the 1970s, Main Street was still home to at least five grocery stores, including an A&P. Western Auto had a branch on Main Street and J.J. Newberry's had built, in 1960, a two-story five-and-dime with a fountain and lunch counter. Smalley's, a stage theater converted into a movie theater, had a single screen across from a Farm & Home store. With its post office, library, and the Baseball Hall of Fame, Main Street resembled a true village square.

Today, the village has fewer traditional services for year-round and seasonal residents. Once boasting half a dozen gas stations, the village now has two. Traditional grocers have been reduced to one, and in 1977 Great American was built on the outskirts of town, replacing the town's bowling alley. Most Main Street shops now cater to the tourist trade and feature gifts and souvenirs.

The Cooperstown Chamber of Commerce, established in 1917, looks to develop business and trade in the Cooperstown region. Serving also as a visitor center in its main office, the Chamber also manages a seasonal kiosk on the corner of Main and Pioneer St for tourists.

Cooperstown was formerly served by the Cooperstown Municipal Airport, which was a two-runway facility fewer than two miles to the northwest of town center. That field closed in the 1960s. The village is now served by a small grass field in nearby Westville and a larger paved one-runway facility in Oneonta.

== Sister city ==
The sister city of Cooperstown is Windsor, Nova Scotia. This is due to Windsor's claiming to be the birthplace of ice hockey and Cooperstown at one time being considered to be the birthplace of baseball.

== Geography and climate ==
According to the United States Census Bureau, the village has a total area of 1.6 square miles (4.1 km^{2}), of which 1.5 square miles (3.9 km^{2}) is land and 0.04 square miles (0.10 km^{2}) (2.53%) is water.

The source of the Susquehanna River is in Cooperstown at the outlet of Otsego Lake. Blackbird Bay of Otsego Lake is north of the village.

The junction of New York State Route 28 and New York State Route 80 was constructed at Cooperstown. The village is also served by County Routes 31 and 33.

== Climate ==
Cooperstown has a humid continental climate (Dfb), with cold, very snowy winters, warm summers, and abundant precipitation year-round. Freezing temperatures have been observed in every month of the year, except for July. The record low temperature is −34 °F (−37 °C), set on February 9, 1934, and the record high temperature is 99 °F (37 °C), set on July 9–10, 1936.

Climate data for Cooperstown, New York, 1991–2020 normals, extremes 1893–present
Month	Jan	Feb	Mar	Apr	May	Jun	Jul	Aug	Sep	Oct	Nov	Dec	Year
Record high °F (°C)	65 (18)	70 (21)	87 (31)	93 (34)	92 (33)	97 (36)	99 (37)	98 (37)	97 (36)	88 (31)	79 (26)	66 (19)	99 (37)
Mean maximum °F (°C)	53.7 (12.1)	52.6 (11.4)	62.1 (16.7)	77.7 (25.4)	85.0 (29.4)	87.8 (31.0)	88.6 (31.4)	87.7 (30.9)	84.4 (29.1)	76.0 (24.4)	65.4 (18.6)	55.3 (12.9)	90.9 (32.7)
Mean daily maximum °F (°C)	23.3 (−4.8)	26.1 (−3.3)	34.5 (1.4)	48.1 (8.9)	60.4 (15.8)	68.2 (20.1)	72.6 (22.6)	70.8 (21.6)	63.8 (17.7)	51.8 (11.0)	39.2 (4.0)	28.9 (−1.7)	49.0 (9.4)
Daily mean °F (°C)	18.4 (−7.6)	20.2 (−6.6)	28.4 (−2.0)	41.0 (5.0)	52.7 (11.5)	61.3 (16.3)	65.8 (18.8)	64.1 (17.8)	57.0 (13.9)	45.6 (7.6)	34.6 (1.4)	25.0 (−3.9)	42.8 (6.0)
Mean daily minimum °F (°C)	13.6 (−10.2)	14.2 (−9.9)	22.2 (−5.4)	34.0 (1.1)	44.9 (7.2)	54.4 (12.4)	59.0 (15.0)	57.4 (14.1)	50.2 (10.1)	39.4 (4.1)	30.0 (−1.1)	21.1 (−6.1)	36.7 (2.6)
Mean minimum °F (°C)	−9.7 (−23.2)	−6.4 (−21.3)	1.4 (−17.0)	20.2 (−6.6)	30.3 (−0.9)	39.5 (4.2)	47.7 (8.7)	45.0 (7.2)	34.6 (1.4)	25.2 (−3.8)	13.4 (−10.3)	0.4 (−17.6)	−13.0 (−25.0)
Record low °F (°C)	−33 (−36)	−34 (−37)	−19 (−28)	5 (−15)	19 (−7)	28 (−2)	35 (2)	29 (−2)	21 (−6)	12 (−11)	−12 (−24)	−30 (−34)	−34 (−37)
Average precipitation inches (mm)	3.10 (79)	3.06 (78)	3.61 (92)	4.18 (106)	3.71 (94)	4.73 (120)	4.64 (118)	4.57 (116)	4.21 (107)	4.95 (126)	3.24 (82)	3.59 (91)	47.59 (1,209)
Average snowfall inches (cm)	21.7 (55)	18.8 (48)	17.6 (45)	2.8 (7.1)	0.1 (0.25)	0.0 (0.0)	0.0 (0.0)	0.0 (0.0)	0.0 (0.0)	0.4 (1.0)	5.9 (15)	18.2 (46)	85.5 (217.35)
Average extreme snow depth inches (cm)	12.5 (32)	14.8 (38)	13.8 (35)	2.5 (6.4)	0.0 (0.0)	0.0 (0.0)	0.0 (0.0)	0.0 (0.0)	0.0 (0.0)	0.3 (0.76)	3.3 (8.4)	9.0 (23)	20.8 (53)
Average precipitation days (≥ 0.01 in)	14.5	11.6	12.5	12.4	13.2	12.1	11.2	12.0	11.1	13.9	12.8	14.3	151.6
Average snowy days (≥ 0.1 in)	10.7	9.7	6.6	1.5	0.2	0.0	0.0	0.0	0.0	0.3	3.7	8.4	41.1
Source 1: NOAA
Source 2: National Weather Service

== Demographics ==
Historical population
Census	Pop.	Note	%±
1860	1,597		—
1880	2,199		—
1890	2,657		20.8%
1900	2,368		−10.9%
1910	2,484		4.9%
1920	2,725		9.7%
1930	2,909		6.8%
1940	2,599		−10.7%
1950	2,727		4.9%
1960	2,553		−6.4%
1970	2,403		−5.9%
1980	2,342		−2.5%
1990	2,180		−6.9%
2000	2,032		−6.8%
2010	1,852		−8.9%
2020	1,794		−3.1%
U.S. Decennial Census

As of the census of 2000, there were 2,032 people, 906 households, and 479 families residing in the village. The population density was 1,317.5 inhabitants per square mile (508.7/km^{2}). There were 1,070 housing units at an average density of 693.8 per square mile (267.9/km^{2}). The racial makeup of the village was 96.21% White, 0.94% African American, 0.10% Native American, 1.62% Asian, 0.34% from other races, and 0.79% from two or more races. Hispanic or Latino of any race were 2.31% of the population.

There were 906 households, out of which 23.2% had children under the age of 18 living with them, 41.9% were married couples living together, 8.7% had a female householder with no husband present, and 47.1% were non-families. 41.4% of all households were made up of individuals, and 19.2% had someone living alone who was 65 years of age or older. The average household size was 2.05 and the average family size was 2.83.

In the village the population was spread out, with 20.2% under the age of 18, 5.4% from 18 to 24, 24.7% from 25 to 44, 22.8% from 45 to 64, and 26.9% who were 65 years of age or older. The median age was 45 years. For every 100 females, there were 81.4 males. For every 100 females age 18 and over, there were 76.8 males.

The median income for a household in the village was $36,992, and the median income for a family was $50,250. Males had a median income of $39,625 versus $20,595 for females. The per capita income for the village was $26,799. About 5.0% of families and 10.2% of the population were below the poverty line, including 7.5% of those under age 18 and 5.4% of those age 65 or over.

== Arts and culture ==
=== Annual cultural events ===
The Baseball Hall of Fame Induction Ceremony is a yearly ceremony where inductees are officially added to the Hall of Fame. In 2020, the ceremony was cancelled due to the COVID-19 pandemic.

The internationally noted Glimmerglass Festival is closely associated with Cooperstown. Founded in 1975, the company originally performed in the Cooperstown Junior/Senior High School auditorium. In 1987, the company relocated to farmland donated by Tom Goodyear of the Cary Mede Estate 8 miles (13 km) north of the village, where the Alice Busch Opera Theater was built, the first new opera-specific hall in the United States built since 1966. It has a popular summer season with a reputation for producing high quality opera and commissioning new works.

=== Tourism ===
The Baseball Hall of Fame is the main site of the village, and has been attracting baseball fans since 1939. According to the Hall of Fame, 260,000 tourists visit the museum each year, with over 17 million total visits.

Other attractions include the Fenimore Farm & Country Village, the Fenimore Art Museum and its library, and the Clark Sports Center, a large fitness facility, where the annual Hall of Fame Induction is held. Also close by to the village is the Fly Creek Cider Mill and Orchard located in the hamlet of Fly Creek, and the Brewery Ommegang located south of Cooperstown.

== Sports ==
The Clark Sports Center is an 110,000 sq ft (10,000 m^{2}) recreational center with 17 acres (6.9 ha) of outdoor fields established in 1986. The Hall of Fame induction is held annually at the center. The facility was renovated and expanded in 2013.

Cooperstown retains a close connection with the baseball world, and "Cooperstown" has become synonymous with the Hall of Fame. Several nationally recognized tournaments are held in the area. Cooperstown Dreams Park in nearby Hartwick Seminary hosts 104 level U12 teams for weekly tournaments in the summer. Several professionals, including David Price and Matt Garza, have attended CDP. In 2010, Cooperstown got an official baseball team of its own, the Cooperstown Hawkeyes, a Perfect Game Collegiate Baseball League team who play against many other teams from the northeast during the summer, with home games played at historic Doubleday Field. In 2014 the team was voluntarily suspended from the league.

== Notable people ==
Notable historic year-round or summer residents of Cooperstown included:

- Kenneth Bainbridge — physicist, contributor to the Manhattan Project
- Erastus Flavel Beadle — pioneer in publishing pulp fiction, in particular creating the dime novel
- F. Ambrose Clark — equine sportsman, philanthropist, art collector
- Robert Sterling Clark — philanthropist, racehorse owner, art collector
- Stephen Carlton Clark — philanthropist, art collector
- Tracy Beadle — druggist, banker, politician
- James Fenimore Cooper — grew up here and lived here as an adult, novelist of the New York frontier
- William Cooper — founder and politician
- Michaela Dietz — actress
- John A. Dix — Civil War general and political leader
- Abner Doubleday — Civil War officer and supposed inventor of baseball
- Bud Fowler — baseball player and member of the National Baseball Hall of Fame
- Lauren Groff — writer and novelist
- Kevin Guilfoile — author of Cast of Shadows and The Thousand
- Annette E. McCrea – pioneer landscape architect
- Samuel F. B. Morse — inventor, painter
- Samuel Nelson — Associate Justice of the U.S. Supreme Court
- Thurlow Weed — newspaper publisher and Whig and Republican Party politician

=== Cooperstown writers ===
Aside from James Fenimore Cooper, noted Cooperstown authors include his daughter Susan Fenimore Cooper, the author of Rural Hours, and his great-great-grandson Paul Fenimore Cooper, author of Tal: His Marvelous Adventures with Noom-Zor-Noom (1929, 1957, 2001).

Other writers include modern author Lauren Groff, who has written extensively about her hometown, notably in The Monsters of Templeton, a story that brings several Cooperstown legends to life.

The work of Cooperstown-based novelist and poet Marly Youmans has referred to the area, notably in her epic poem Thaliad (2012), in which a group of child survivors of an apocalypse travel north and make their new home in an abandoned village on the shore of Glimmerglass Lake.'

=== The Clark family ===
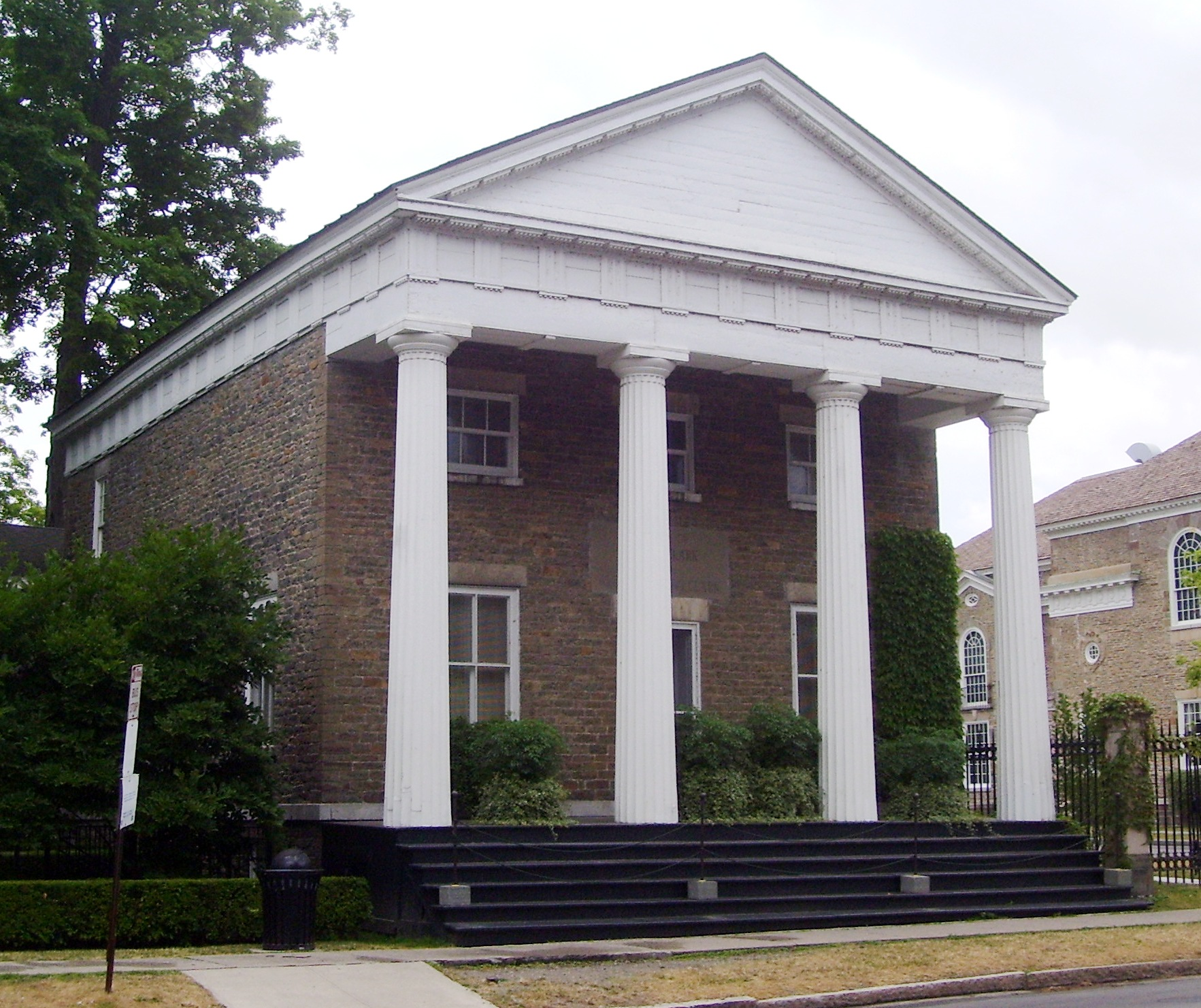
The Clark Estates building, originally the Otsego County Bank, was built in 1831 in the Greek Revival style

The Clark family, whose fortune originated with a half-ownership of the patent for Singer Sewing Machine, have lived in Cooperstown since the mid-19th century. The family's holdings include interests assembled over a century and a half, which are now held through trusts and foundations. Their dominance is reflected in Clark ownership of more than 10,000 acres (40 km^{2}) of largely undeveloped land in and around greater Cooperstown.

In the village, the Otesaga, the Cooper Inn, Clark Estates, and the Clara Welch Thanksgiving Home are all Clark properties. In addition, the Clarks were founding partners of, and retain an interest in, the Baseball Hall of Fame and the Mary Imogene Bassett Hospital.

Cooperstown still receives support from the Clark Foundation, which has donated to a variety of causes including various scholarships, non-profit organizations, and village services. The family has also donated land for the Cooperstown Central School District's new high school location − formerly horse stables − as well as for parks such as Fairy Springs and Council Rock, and recently, for a new Little League baseball field.

Jane Forbes Clark, the primary family heir today, has continued this commitment. She has purchased strategic land to ensure the preservation of village entry points, as well as overseeing the expansion of the various Clark holdings.

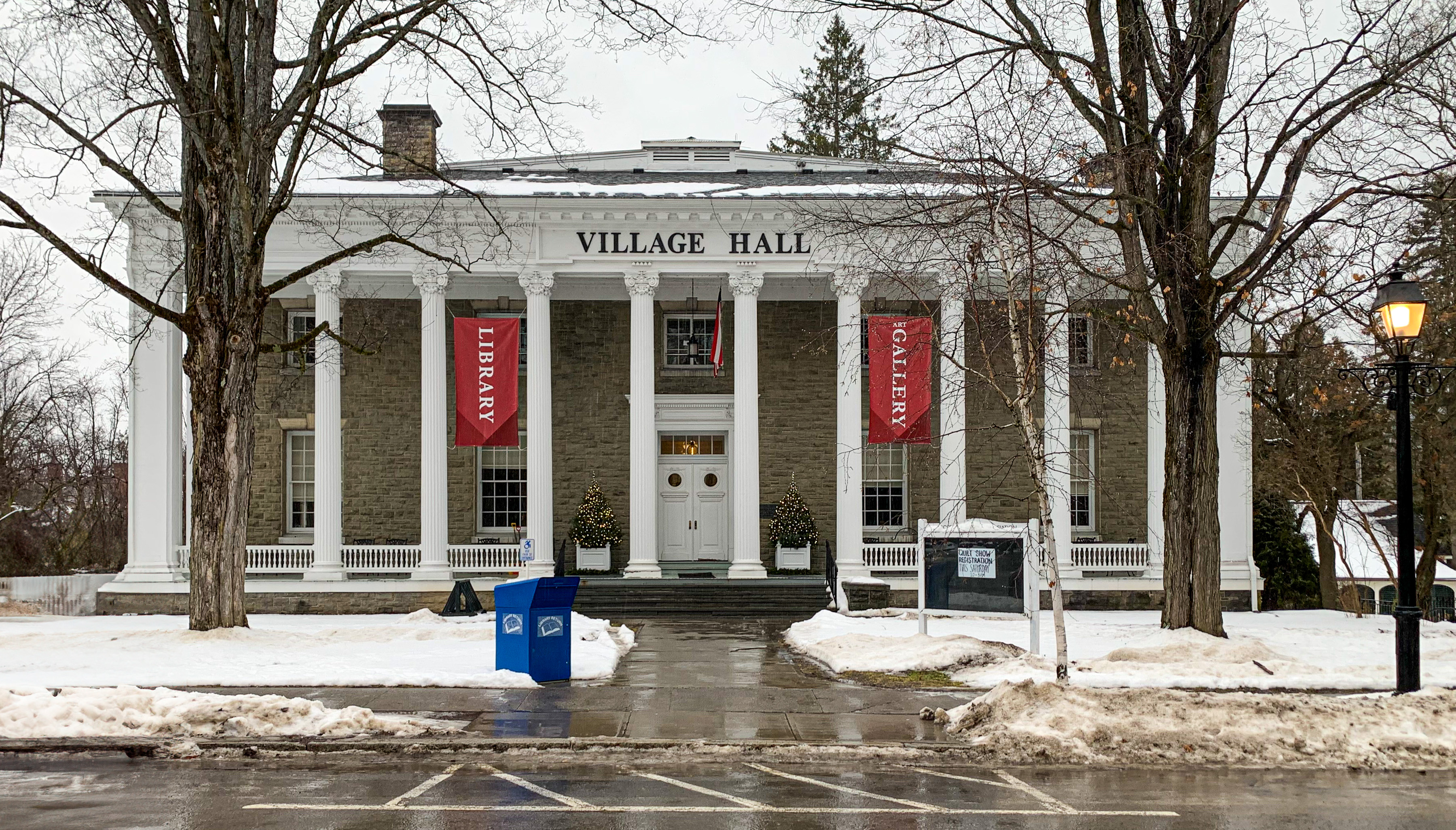
Cooperstown Village Hall and Library

In late November 2013, Clark discussed her family's continued support for the community during a meeting of The Women's Club of Cooperstown. The Clark Foundation supports a variety of Cooperstown and Otsego County organizations and causes with donations of $7.5 million to charitable organizations every year. The family's Scriven Foundation, formed in 1975, donates to only Otsego County nonprofit organizations, such as the Cooperstown Village Library. The Scriven Foundation donates $1.5 million every year. According to Clark's presentation, the family's businesses employ 4,198 people, with 3,100 of those positions being full-time jobs.

== Schools ==
The Cooperstown Central School District has two buildings located in the town. The Elementary School is located at 21 Walnut Street. It was built in the 1950s and was designed with a bomb shelter in the basement. The Cooperstown Junior/Senior High School was built in 1970 at 39 Linden Avenue, on land donated by the Clark family. The school district offices are located in the high school building.

== Architecture ==
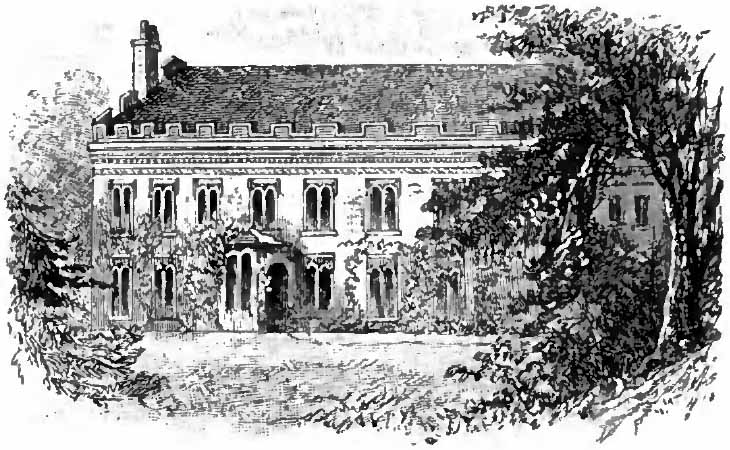
Otsego Hall

There are, and were, significant residential, commercial, and religious structures in Cooperstown. Original residences related to the founding Cooper family, such as Edgewater and Heathcote, are still standing. Otsego Hall, James Fenimore Cooper's residence which once stood in what is now Cooper Park, has been lost, along with his chalet. Byberry, the cottage built for his daughter, remains on River Street, albeit in altered form.

"Fynmere", a grand stone manor from the early 20th century, erected by Cooper heirs on the eastern edge of town, was designed by noted architect Charles A. Platt. Later donated to the Presbyterian Church as a retirement home, the property was razed in 1979. Both its grounds and those of neighboring property Heathcote (extant today), built for Katherine Guy Cooper (1895–1988), daughter-in-law of James Fenimore Cooper III, were laid out by noted landscape architect Ellen Biddle Shipman.

Residences, business, and properties related to the Clark family abound within the village. From the original family seat of "Fernleigh" to the 1928 Georgian manor of "West Hill", the properties are exceptionally well cared for. Fernleigh is a Second Empire stone mansion designed by New Jersey architect James Van Dyke and built in 1869. The original garden at Fernleigh, located to the south of the mansion, included a servants' house and a Victorian Turkish bath; both details have since been lost. In 1923, Stephen C. Clark, Sr. commissioned Marcus T. Reynolds and Bryant Fleming, a landscape design professor at Cornell University, to design new gardens for Fernleigh.

The manor home of Robert Sterling Clark, Red Creek Farm, remains on the outskirts of the Village. His brother F. Ambrose Clark's "Iroquois Farm" manor house was razed in the early 1980s. Also razed in 1979 was the Mohican Farms manor house, owned by the Clark Estates, in Springfield Center, New York. It was formerly the summer home of the Spaulding sporting good family from Buffalo.

Edward Severin Clark built a farm complex at Fenimore Farm in 1918, which has been adapted as the Fenimore Farm & Country Village. His stone manor, built in 1931, was bequeathed to the New York State Historical Association and today serves as the Fenimore Art Museum.

Other structures, such as the Baseball Hall of Fame, The Otesaga Hotel, Clark Estate Office, Kingfisher Tower, which lies on the east side of Otsego Lake, Bassett Hospital, and The Clara Welch Thanksgiving Home, exemplify Cooperstown's architectural wealth.

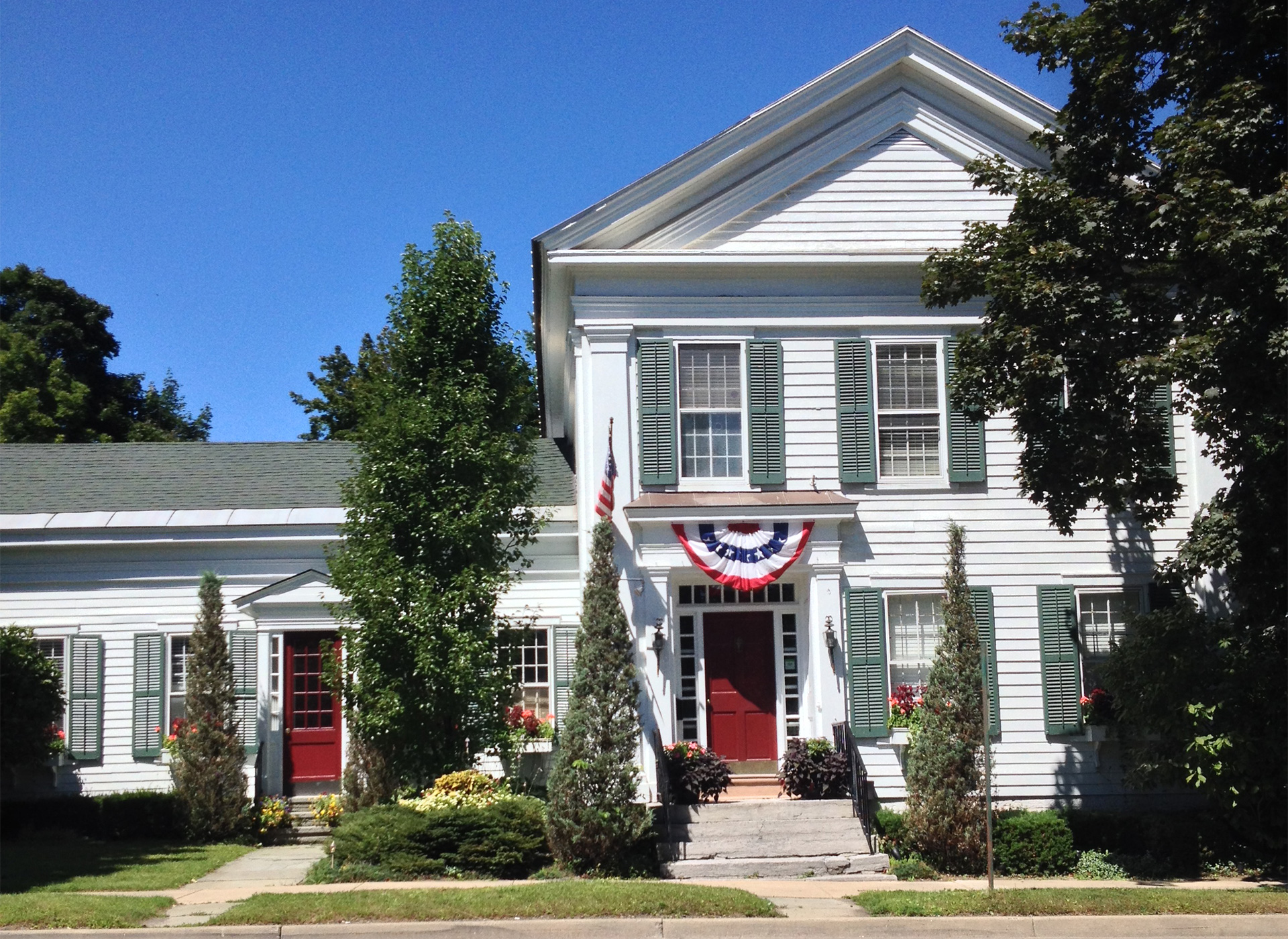
The White House Inn

The Bowers family "Lakelands" manor, neighboring "Mohican Lodge", and their former estate of "Willowbrook" (1818; presently the Cooper Inn) serve as further examples of grand homes erected by affluent residents. The Bowers family received the land patent extending from current-day Bowerstown to very near Cherry Valley, New York, upon which Congressman John Myer Bowers built Lakelands in 1804. Woodside Hall, on the eastern edge of the village proper, was built c. 1829 by Eben B. Morehouse and was subsequently owned by several prominent individuals, including, in 1895, financier Walter C. Stokes of New York City. Prior to the Stokes' ownership, the home was visited by Martin Van Buren, the eighth President of the United States.

The village offices and Cooperstown Art Association are housed in a neo-classical building designed by Ernest Flagg. He is famed for Manhattan's 47-story Singer Building and the Boldt Castle on the St. Lawrence River. The Cooperstown building was originally commissioned by Elizabeth Scriven Clark in 1898 as a YMCA. Her son Robert Sterling Clark gave it to the village in 1932 during the Great Depression.

Several prominent buildings in town were designed or updated by noted architect Frank P. Whiting, who originally worked under Ernest Flagg. A resident of New York City and Cooperstown, Whiting was also a noted artist. He designed the Fenimore Farm & Country Village farm buildings and the shingle-style manor at "Leatherstocking Falls Farm", the residence of Dorothy Stokes Bostwick Smith Campbell, the landscaping for which was done by the all-female firm of Wodell & Cottrell in the 1930s. Whiting also designed 56 Lake Street. In 1932 Whiting designed and built his residence, "Westerly", on a half-acre lot at the north end of Nelson Avenue. The home is in the Colonial style and today retains many interior and exterior features of the original home. In June 1923 Whiting wrote a featured monograph "Cooperstown in The Times of Our Forefathers" for volume IX of the White Pine Series of Architectural Monographs containing several sketches and measured drawings of homes in Cooperstown.

In 1916, financier William T. Hyde acquired "Glimmerglen", a lakeside property north of Fenimore Farm, from the Constable family. The house burned to the ground shortly thereafter and was rebuilt by society architect Alfred Hopkins, who also designed a new farm complex, gate house, and assorted dependencies. The estate was featured in a multipage advertisement in Country Life magazine in late 1922 when the property was put up for sale. The manor and greenhouses were razed in the late 1960s after their acquisition by the Clark family. The stone gatehouse, featured in the Architectural Record is extant today and owned by the Clark Foundation, as is the boathouse and the distinctive cottage known as "Winter House".

== See also ==
- Burlington Company
- USS Cooperstown (LCS-23), a Freedom-class littoral combat ship named after Cooperstown, NY
