= Cooperstown Junior/Senior High School =

Public school in New York, U.S.

Location
- 39 Linden Ave, Cooperstown, NY 13326
- Coordinates: 42.6882°N 74.9323°W

Information
- Type: Public Secondary
- Motto: Excellence in Education
- Established: 1969; 57 years ago
- School district: Cooperstown Central School District
- Superintendent: Sarah Spross
- Grades: 7-12
- Enrollment: 398 (2023-2024)
- Colors: Orange and Black
- Team name: The Hawkeyes
- Website: www.cooperstowncs.org

Cooperstown Junior/Senior High School is a public junior and senior high school in the village of Cooperstown, New York, United States.

== Description ==
Cooperstown Junior/Senior High School currently enrolls over 400 students and is the only high school in the village of Cooperstown, New York. It is in the jurisdiction of the Cooperstown Central School District.

=== Student statistical profiles ===
According to the National Center for Education Statistics, the 2018-2019 student/teacher ratio at Cooperstown Junior/Senior High was 12.41. The New York State Education Department reported that class sizes at the school varied by subject, with a low of 11 students per teacher in Physics, and a high of 25 students per teacher in Earth Science. U.S. News & World Report ranked students' 2021 Mathematics proficiency at 98%; English Language Arts proficiency at 94%; and the school Graduation Rate was 89%.

== History ==
The original high school was the Cooperstown Union and Free High School, organized in October 1871. Elizabeth Ellsworth quotes Cooper, Shaw, Littell and Hollis:

...the building was built on Susquehanna Avenue in 1868 at a cost of $14,000. A $4,000 addition was added in 1881 when enrollment at the school hit a new high of 426 students, just a bit under half of the number of students at CCS today.

The 1908 building had been designed by architect Wilson Potter of New York City, who "made an extensive study of the best school buildings of the world". It had modern features: "The ventilating system forces warm air into all the rooms and draws out the impure air. Sanitary drinking fountains are at convenient intervals in the building and it is well lighted at night with electricity. A combined automatic and personally operated electric system centering in the principal's office, rings all class bells or a fire alarm if necessary in every room." The new building served grades one through twelve.

The current school district was centralized in 1944, with a vote of "residents of 19 school districts in the towns of Otsego, Middlefield, and Hartwick, including the Cooperstown Union and Free District".

By February 1961, planning for a new Cooperstown Junior/Senior High School building had begun. The Board of Education discussed "a problem of insufficient space to meet our needs" due to increasing student enrollment and needed expansion of curriculum to offer advanced vocational education courses.

In March 1961, the Board of Education proposed a $220,000 bond issue to support "building construction, $147,125; sewage disposal, water and electrical service, $20,000; architectural and engineering fees, $15,000; clerk of the works, part-time, $3,000; legal services and general administration, $2,500; insurance during construction, $750; roads, walks, curbings, and catch basins, $7,500; contingency, $10,000; furniture and equipment, $14,025".

In 1966, voters approved a bond issue of $2,750,000 for a new building. Architect Warren Ashley of West Hartford, Connecticut, designed the building, which was located south of the Elementary School at Walnut Street. At the dedication of the new facilities in April 1969, it was noted that in the past 150 years, ten bond issues had passed and two were defeated.

In 1970, the Board of Education named "...the modern, functional and large auditorium of the new Cooperstown Junior-Senior High School" in honor of Nicholas J. Sterling, retiring Cooperstown Central School District Principal, for his 38 years of service to the school and district.

The school board retired the school's Redskins mascot in 2013. Cooperstown Junior/Senior High School students had campaigned for the change, and inspired Ray Halbritter of the Oneida Indian Nation to pursue the cause with the NFL. He donated $10,000 to the school for new Cooperstown Hawkeyes sports jerseys, and he presented one of the jerseys to then-president Barack Obama in November 2013.

Voters in the district approved a $5 million capital project proposal in December 2019, in part to include upgrading the school's library-media center, renovating the gymnasium, and revamping the athletic fields to address a drainage problem.
