= Otsego Hall =

Estate in Cooperstown, New York

Coordinates: 42.6993°N 74.9229°W

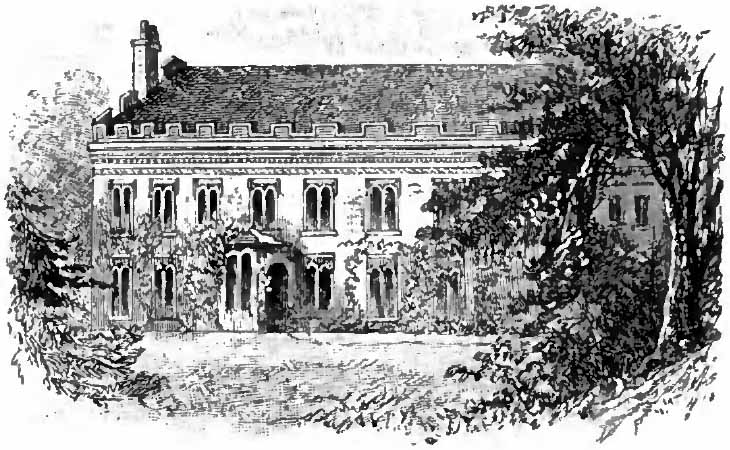
- Otsego Hall after 1834 remodeling
- Interactive map of Otsego Hall

History
- Built: 1796–1799

Site notes
- Architectural styles: Federal, remodeled to Gothic in 1834
- Owner: William Cooper, James Fenimore Cooper

Otsego Hall was a house in Cooperstown, New York, United States, built by William Cooper, founder of the town. Construction started in 1796 and was completed by 1799 in the Federal style. For many years, it was the manor house of Cooper's landed estate, and was one of the largest private residences in central New York. Cooper had moved his family to the settlement in 1790, and his son James Fenimore Cooper, who became an author, also lived in the house.

After the death of the senior Cooper and his widow, the mansion was vacant for many years. In June 1834, James Fenimore Cooper resolved to reopen the house after an absence of nearly sixteen years. The building had been long closed and falling into decay. He had it remodelled in a castellated Gothic style. The ceiling on the first floor was raised from ten feet to thirteen feet. Also Gothic windows and battlements were installed. In this, Cooper was assisted by his friend, Samuel F. B. Morse, a painter and inventor, who designed two towers for the front and east sides of the structure. At first, Cooper spent his winters in New York City and summered in Cooperstown, but eventually he made Otsego Hall his permanent abode. The mansion burned down a few years after his death in 1851, and the surrounding property was sold by the heirs. His daughter, Susan Fenimore Cooper, built a house in Cooperstown, built mainly of bricks and material salvaged from the ruins of Otsego Hall.
