= Fenimore Farm & Country Village =

Museum and attraction in Cooperstown, New York

Coordinates: 42.714°N 74.929°W

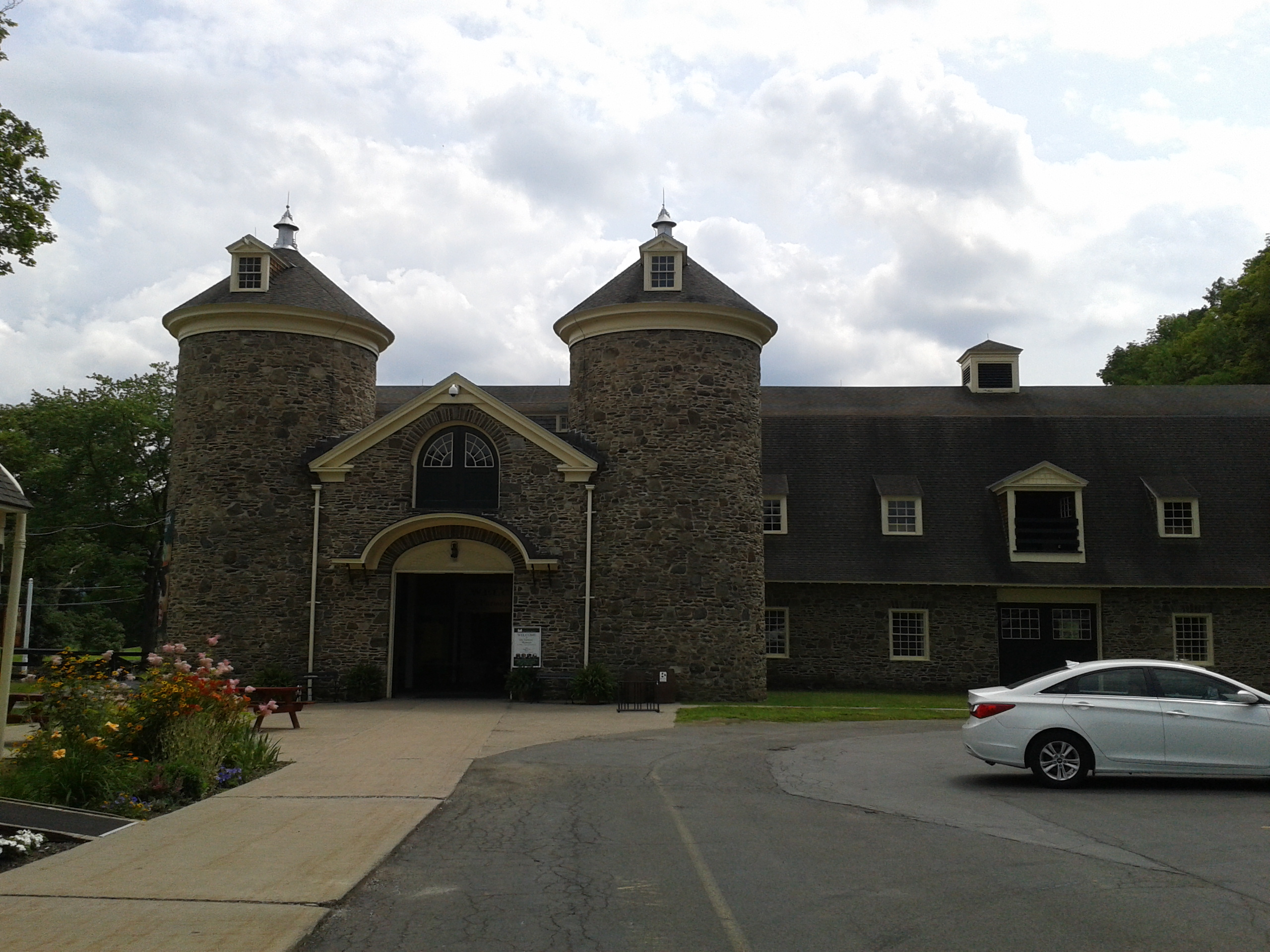
- Entrance to the Farmers' Museum
- Former name: The Farmers' Museum
- Established: 1944
- Location: Otsego, New York, U.S.
- Website: www.fenimorefarm.org

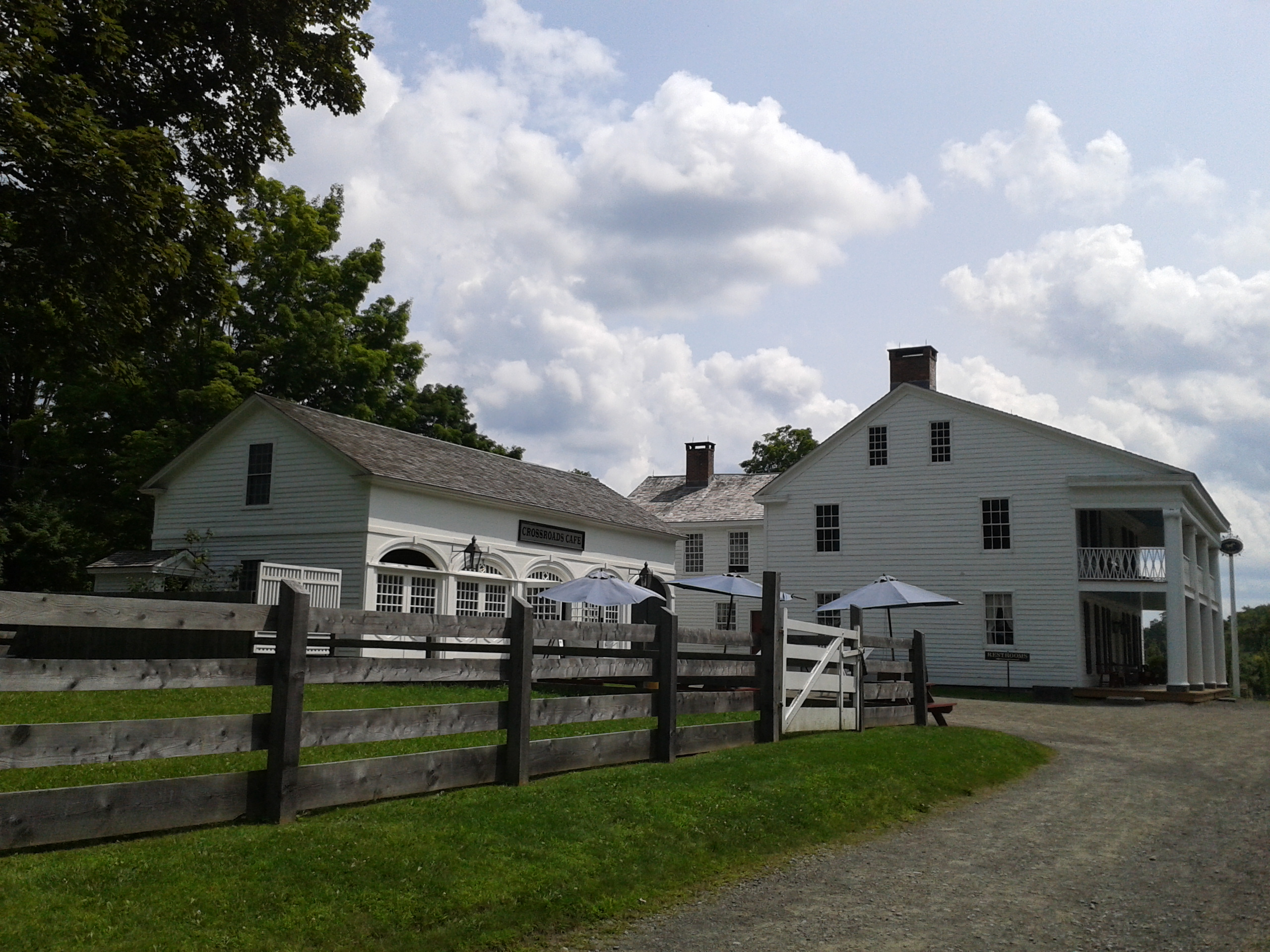
Bump Tavern and the Crossroads Café, seen from the village green

Location in the United States
Location in New York

Fenimore Farm & Country Village, formerly The Farmers' Museum, is a museum located in Otsego, New York, just north of Cooperstown. It recreates rural life from the 19th century through exhibits and interactive workshops. There are more than two dozen authentic, historic buildings on the grounds, including a tavern, a farmstead, a printing office, a pharmacy, a blacksmith's shop, a doctor's office and a general store. There are also exhibits of nineteenth-century games, a children's barnyard and the Cardiff Giant.

== History ==
The site of Fenimore Farm has been part of a working farm since 1813, when it was owned by James Fenimore Cooper, author of The Last of the Mohicans. Judge Samuel Nelson, whose office is part of museum's historic village, bought the farm in 1829 and raised sheep there. Fenimore Farm, as it came to be known, changed hands again in the 1870s, when it was acquired by the Clark family.

In 1918, Edward Severin Clark built a modern, fully equipped complex at Fenimore Farm for his prize herd of cattle. The barn, creamery, and herdsman's cottage are still standing today and are part of the museum complex. Designed by architect Frank Whiting in the Colonial Revival style, these buildings were constructed of local stone. Today, they house museum offices, exhibition spaces, and public areas. The structures are listed on the National Register of Historic Places.

The Farmers' Museum opened its doors to the public in 1944 (82 years ago). At that time, the museum had 5,000 tools and objects, including important collections amassed by the Otsego County Historical Society; William B. Sprague, founder of the Early American Industries Association; and the Wyckoff family, one of Brooklyn's oldest farming families. Today the museum's collections number more than 23,000 artifacts.

Fenimore Farm & Country Village is a private, non-governmental educational organization. It is closely affiliated with its sister organization, Fenimore Art Museum.

As of November 1, 2024, The Farmers' Museum was renamed Fenimore Farm & Country Village, which better recognizes its history as a working farm and incorporates the historic village on the property.

== Exhibits ==
The museum has more than 23,000 artifacts reflecting 19th century farm life in central New York. They are housed in over two dozen buildings across the campus.

The museum also includes working exhibits. There are skilled workers printing real documents, such as the rules of baseball, at the print shop, and weavers producing cloth at looms. The blacksmith shop works to produce hinges, tools and other products for use at the museum and to sell in the general store on the property. At the pharmacy, insect repellent is produced. The skilled craftspeople are available to answer questions about their trades.

Fenimore Farm & Country Village is home to the Empire State Carousel, a hand-crafted merry-go-round which celebrates New York State's history, culture and environment, built on a vintage 1947 36-foot Alan Herschell carousel mechanism. The carousel is the result of efforts made by carver Gerry Holzman of Islip, NY and over 1,000 volunteers from across New York State. The entire production took over two decades. Its artwork incorporates 24-hand carved animals that represent the agricultural and natural resources of New York State.

== See also ==
- Open-air museum
