= Paul Fenimore Cooper =

American writer

- Born: September 15, 1899; Albany, New York
- Died: January 20, 1970 (aged 70); Cooperstown, New York
- Occupations: Writer, translator
- Writing career
- Genres: Children's literature, folklore, non-fiction
- Notable work: Tal: His Marvelous Adventures with Noom-Zor-Noom

Paul Fenimore Cooper (September 15, 1899 – January 20, 1970) was an American writer of children's books and non-fiction, some based on his travels. His first book was a translation of Albanian folk tales.

== Life ==
Paul Fenimore Cooper was born in Albany, New York, in 1899, the son of the writer James Fenimore Cooper (1858–1938) and Susan Linn (Sage) Cooper (1866–1933). His uncle Henry M. Sage (1868–1933) became a state senator. Paul was a great-grandson of the novelist James Fenimore Cooper (1789–1851) and a great-great-grandson of Congressman William Cooper (1754–1809), the founder of Cooperstown, New York. He was also distantly related to Nebraska State Representative Paul F. Clark.

Cooper grew up in Cooperstown. He was educated at the private Taft School, at Yale College, and at Trinity College, Cambridge. At Yale he was an editor of campus humor magazine The Yale Record.

He married Marion Erskine. Their son Paul Fenimore (P. F. Cooper, Jr.) became a physicist and Arctic explorer; he was elected a Fellow of the Arctic Society in 1954. He died in 1970.

Some of Cooper's published books were Tricks of Women and Other Albanian Tales (1928), a translation of folk tales; Tal: His Marvelous Adventures with Noom-Zor-Noom (1929), a children's book about an orphan and the fantastical adventures he encounters on a quest to the land of Troom; Island of the Lost (1961), a non-fiction account of the Arctic expedition of Sir John Franklin, told within a "biography" of King William Island and the resident Eskimo; and Dindle (1964), a children's book about a dwarf who saves a kingdom from a dragon. Tal has had enduring popularity; it was reprinted in new editions in 1957 and 2001.
