= William Cooper (New York politician) =

American judge and politician (1754–1809)

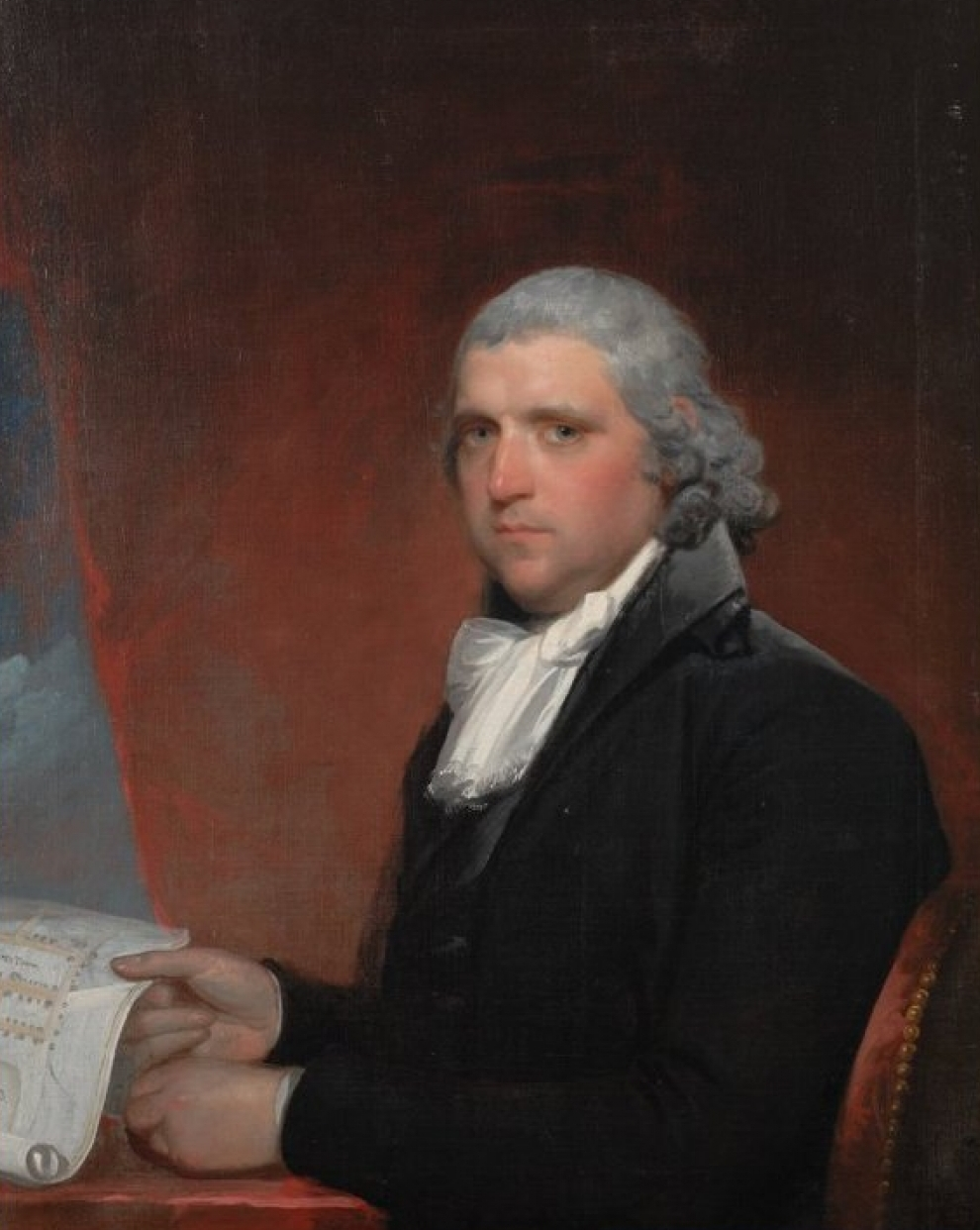
- William Cooper painted by Gilbert Stuart

Member of the U.S. House of Representatives from New York's 10th district
- In office March 4, 1799 – March 3, 1801
- Preceded by: James Cochran
- Succeeded by: Thomas Morris
- In office March 4, 1795 – March 3, 1797
- Preceded by: Silas Talbot
- Succeeded by: James Cochran

Judge of the Court of Common Pleas for Otsego County
- In office February 17, 1791 – ???

Personal details
- Born: December 2, 1754 Smithfield, Province of Pennsylvania, British America
- Died: December 22, 1809 (aged 55) Albany, New York, U.S.
- Party: Federalist
- Spouse: Elizabeth Fenimore
- Children: 7 James Fenimore Cooper

William Cooper (December 2, 1754 – December 22, 1809) was an American politician, judge, merchant, land speculator and developer who was the founder of Cooperstown, New York. He was appointed as a county judge and later served two terms in the United States Congress, representing Otsego County and central New York. He was the father of James Fenimore Cooper, a writer of historical novels related to the New York frontier.

== Life ==
Cooper was born in 1754 in a log house in Smithfield (now Somerton) in the Province of Pennsylvania, just outside Philadelphia, the son of English Quaker parents, James Cooper (b. Byberry, Philadelphia, 1729–1795) and Hannah (Hibbs) Cooper. He appears to have first worked as a wheelwright in and around Byberry. He later settled in Burlington, New Jersey, a Quaker city.

== Marriage and family ==
On December 12, 1774, in Burlington, he was married by a civil magistrate to Elizabeth Fenimore, daughter of Richard Fenimore, a Quaker of Rancocas.

Cooper had five sons and two daughters. His eldest daughter, Hannah, died in 1800 after a fall from a horse. His son James Fenimore Cooper became a successful novelist. All of his other children, aside from James and his youngest daughter Ann, died in their thirties.

== Career ==
During the early 1780s, Cooper became a storekeeper in Burlington, New Jersey, located along the Delaware River. By the end of the decade, he was a successful land speculator and wealthy frontier developer in what is now Otsego County, New York. Soon after the conclusion of the Revolutionary War, he acquired a tract of land several thousand acres in extent within the borders of New York state and lying along the head waters of the Susquehanna River at Otsego Lake. He founded the Village of Otsego at the foot of the lake in 1786, creating a traditional plan for the village inspired by that of Burlington. He moved his family there, arriving on November 10, 1790. The judge and other investors also founded De Kalb, New York, near the east end of Lake Ontario and the St. Lawrence River, in 1803, platting approximately 64,000 acres and selling the parcels on. His brother James took care of the holdings, which were tied up in litigation for years, both before and after the death of Judge Cooper in 1809. The Cooper family holdings were all gone by 1817. In 1852, a village was named Cooper's Falls north of De Kalb. James stayed in the area, and his son William grew up in De Kalb and was a carpenter. The existing De Kalb Historical Society building was built by the judge's nephew, William, and some of his descendants may still live in the area.

After 1791, when Otsego County was split off from Montgomery County, Cooper was appointed as a county judge. He was later elected to two terms in Congress, representing the Federalist Party in the 4th (March 4, 1795 – March 3, 1797) and the 6th United States Congresses (March 4, 1799 – March 3, 1801), after being defeated in the 5th Congress by James Cochran. He was also a candidate for the same seat in 1793.

In 1796, Cooper determined to make his home permanently in the town he had founded, which by that time promised to become a thriving settlement. It attracted many land-hungry migrants from New England. He began the construction of a mansion, completed in 1799, which he named Otsego Hall. For many years it served as his manor house; it was by far the most spacious and stately private residence in central New York.

In the first decade of the 1800s, Cooperstown began to struggle financially and saw a significant increase in violent crime, with Cooper himself being caned in the streets in 1807.

Cooper family tradition has it that Judge Cooper was killed by a blow to the head sustained during an argument with a political opponent after a public meeting in Albany, New York on December 22, 1809. No evidence of this can be found, and the story appeared to arise in 1897. A great-grandson of the judge published this account, which historians consider implausible. They believe that Judge Cooper died of natural causes.

Cooper was buried at the Episcopal Christ Churchyard in Cooperstown. His son James Fenimore Cooper, a popular author of historical novels, was buried there many years later.

A great-grandson, Paul F. Clark, became a Nebraska State Representative. A great-great-grandson, writer Paul Fenimore Cooper, is known for the children's adventure, Tal: His Marvelous Adventures with Noom-Zor-Noom (1929, reprint 1957 and 2001).

== Legacy and honors ==
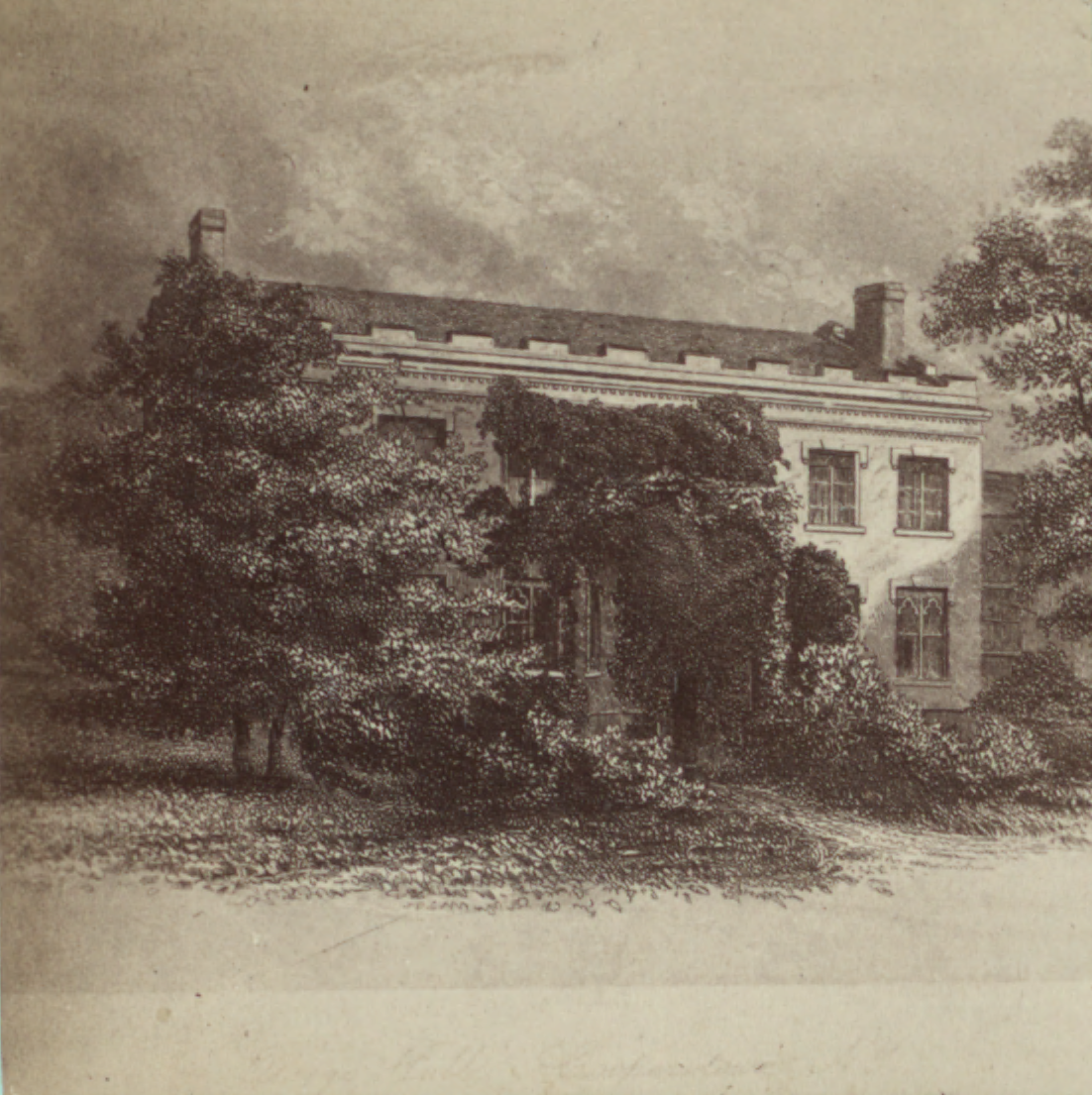
Otsego Hall, Cooperstown

- Cooperstown was named for him, as he was the founder.

U.S. House of Representatives
Preceded by Silas Talbot	Member of the U.S. House of Representatives from New York's 10th congressional district 1795–1797	Succeeded by James Cochran
Preceded by James Cochran	Member of the U.S. House of Representatives from New York's 10th congressional district 1799–1801	Succeeded by Thomas Morris
