= Middlefield District No. 1 School =

- U.S. National Register of Historic Places
- Location within New York Location within the United States
- Nearest city: Cooperstown, New York
- Coordinates: 42°41′24″N 74°50′28″W
- Area: 4.5 acres (1.8 ha)
- Built: 1875
- Architectural style: Greek Revival, Federal
- NRHP reference No.: 87001363
- Added to NRHP: August 13, 1987

Middlefield District No. 1 School is a historic school building located at Cooperstown in Otsego County, New York. It was built in 1875, and is a two-story clapboard, frame building set on a fieldstone foundation with a rear frame ell. The main facade is five bays wide and features a projecting two-story entrance bay surmounted by a cupola containing the original school bell. The school closed in 1954 and, since 1966, the building has been used by the Town of Middlefield Historical Association.

It was listed on the National Register of Historic Places in 1987.
