= Tal: His Marvelous Adventures with Noom-Zor-Noom =

1929 novel by Paul Fenimore Cooper

- Author: Paul Fenimore Cooper
- Illustrator: Ruth Reeves
- Cover artist: Reeves (2009, at least)
- Genre: Fantasy, children's literature
- Publisher: William Morrow and Company
- Publication date: 1929
- Publication place: United States
- Media type: Print (hardcover)
- Pages: 305 pp
- ISBN: 1-930900-08-2 (2001)
- OCLC: 423219
- LC Class: PZ8.C792 Tal
- Preceded by: Tricks of Women and Other Albanian Tales
- Followed by: Island of the Lost

Tal: His Marvelous Adventures with Noom-Zor-Noom is a children's fantasy novel by Paul Fenimore Cooper, illustrated by Ruth Reeves, and published by William Morrow in 1929. New editions were published in 1957 by Stephen Daye Press and in 2001 by Purple House Press. The story features an orphan who goes on a quest to the land of Troom with a wise storyteller, Noom-Zor-Noom, and his talking donkey.

== Plot summary ==
A man and his talking donkey take a young boy, Tal, on an adventure. The man has been chosen to tell a story on an occasion of great importance and it must be the very best story possible. The man has chosen Tal to travel with him, thinking that the boy will be able to help him choose the right story. Each day they travel through different lands and meet new characters, and each night the man shares a new story with Tal. He is expecting that, by journey's end, Tal will choose the best story.

== Reception ==
Tal has been compared favorably to The Wizard of Oz and also has a journey plot.

== Noom-Zor-Noom's stories ==
The book contains numerous stories that Noom-Zor-Noom tells on their way to Troom.

- "The Enchanted Tapestry"
- "The Turtle"
- "The Cloud"
- "The Green Horse"
- "Millitinkle"
- "The Music Box"
- "Trumbilloo the Magician"
- "Sar, Nar, and Jinook"
- "The Cobbler"
- "Bantagooma"
- "Tarrandar's Secret"
- "The Toy Maker"
- "The Four Winds"
- "The Great Giant Bunggah"

== Main characters ==
- Tal
- Noom-Zor-Noom
- Millitinkle

== Minor characters ==
- King Tazzarin of Troom
- The Mellikanoo
- The Wimzies
- The Elephant Ferryman

== Storytellers in Troom ==
- Repper-Tep-Tep
- Brah
- Akadon
- Punda-Poo
- Noom-Zor-Noom

== Locations ==
- Martoona
- Troom
