= The San Remo =

Residential skyscraper in Manhattan, New York

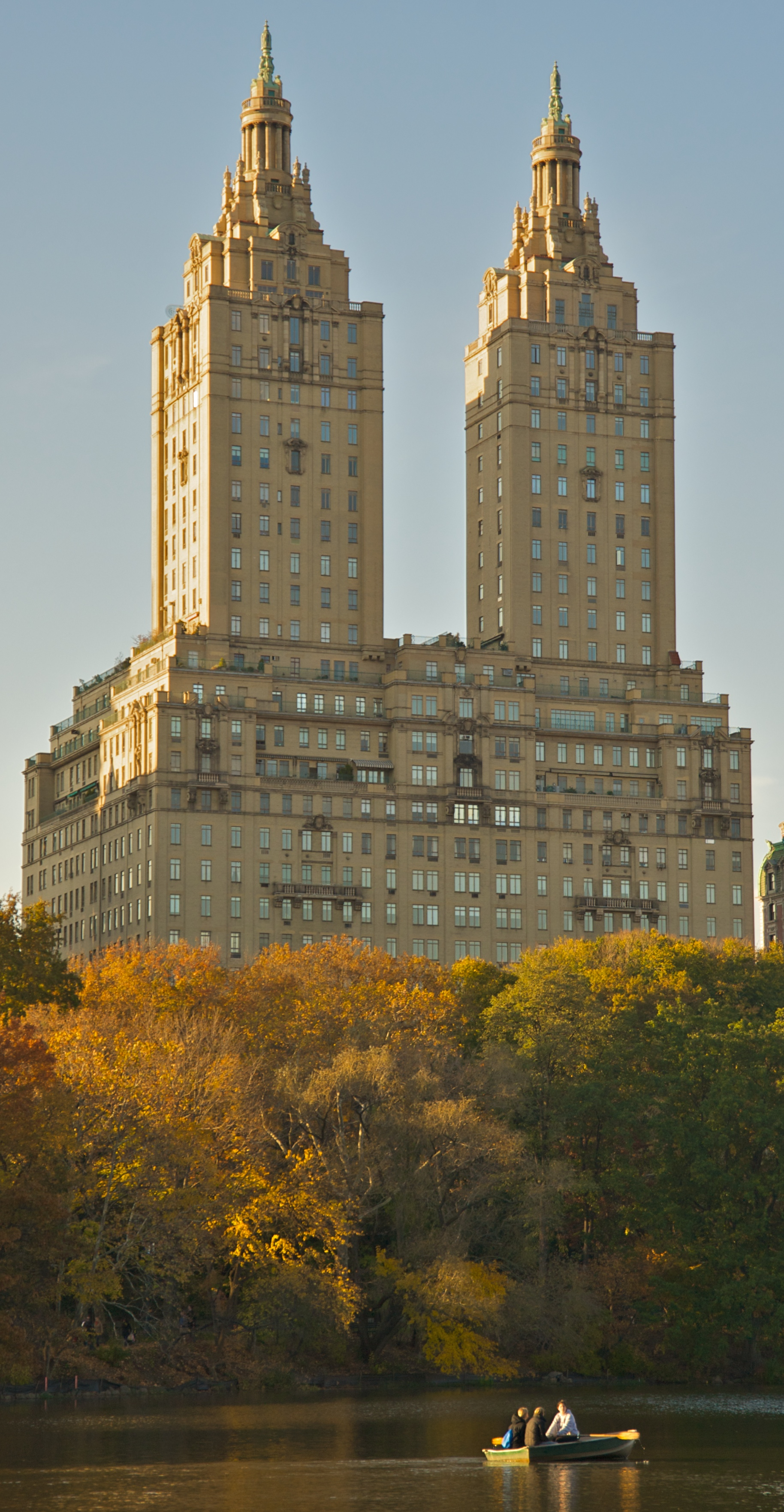
- View from the southeast
- Interactive map of the The San Remo area

General information
- Type: Housing cooperative
- Architectural style: Renaissance Revival
- Location: 145–146 Central Park West, Manhattan, New York, United States
- Coordinates: 40°46′41″N 73°58′30″W
- Construction started: 1929; 97 years ago
- Completed: September 21, 1930; 96 years ago

Height
- Height: 400 ft (120 m)

Technical details
- Structural system: Steel superstructure
- Floor count: 27
- Lifts/elevators: 10

Design and construction
- Architect: Emery Roth
- Main contractor: HRH Construction

New York City Landmark
- Designated: March 31, 1987
- Reference no.: 1519

U.S. Historic district – Contributing property
- Designated: November 9, 1982
- Reference no.: 82001189

The San Remo is a cooperative apartment building at 145 and 146 Central Park West, between 74th and 75th Streets, adjacent to Central Park on the Upper West Side of Manhattan in New York City, United States. It was constructed from 1929 to 1930 and was designed by architect Emery Roth in the Renaissance Revival style. The San Remo is 27 stories tall, with twin towers rising from a 17-story base. The building is a contributing property to the Central Park West Historic District, a National Register of Historic Places–listed district, and is a New York City designated landmark.

The 17-story base surrounds an internal courtyard to the west, while the 10-story towers rise from the eastern portion of the base. There are numerous setbacks between the 14th and 17th stories, which double as terraces. The first three stories are clad in rusticated blocks of limestone, with two main entrances at ground level. The remainder of the facade is made of light brick with terracotta ornamentation, as well as movable windows to improve air circulation. The tops of the towers contain "temples" with round colonnades and lanterns. The building has twin terrazzo and marble lobbies with molded plaster ceilings. On the upper stories, many apartments contain living and dining rooms arranged around a central gallery, as well as bedrooms in the rear. There were originally 122 apartments, each with six to sixteen rooms, but several apartments have been split or combined over the years.

The San Remo replaced an 11-story apartment building with the same name, built in 1891. The current apartment complex was the first building on Central Park West to incorporate large twin towers. The building opened in September 1930, attracting large amounts of commentary from the media. It soon went into receivership following the collapse of the Bank of United States, which held the mortgage. The San Remo experienced financial difficulties throughout much of the 1930s before being acquired in 1940 by an investment syndicate. The building was converted to a housing cooperative in 1972 following a failed conversion attempt in 1970. Over the years, the San Remo has been renovated several times. Its residents have included directors, actors, and musicians.

== Site ==
The San Remo is at 145 and 146 Central Park West on the Upper West Side of Manhattan in New York City, United States. The building occupies the western sidewalk of Central Park West (formerly Eighth Avenue) between 74th Street to the south and 75th Street to the north. The San Remo occupies a nearly rectangular land lot with an area of 34,532 ft^{2} (3,208.1 m^{2}). The land lot has a frontage of 204.33 ft (62.28 m) along Central Park West, 180 ft (55 m) on 74th Street, and 150 ft (46 m) on 75th Street. Nearby places include the Kenilworth apartment building, the Fourth Universalist Society in the City of New York, and the West 76th Street Historic District immediately to the north; the Langham apartment building to the south; and the Ramble and Lake of Central Park to the east. In addition, the Dakota is two blocks south and the New-York Historical Society library and museum is two blocks north.

The San Remo is one of several apartment buildings on Central Park West that are primarily identified by an official name. Even though a street address was sufficient to identify these apartment buildings, this trend followed a British practice of giving names to buildings without addresses. By contrast, buildings on Fifth Avenue, along the eastern side of Central Park, are mainly known by their addresses. Christopher Gray of The New York Times described the San Remo as one of several apartment buildings in Manhattan that were named after 1920; according to Gray, such structures usually "were either truly grand or had hotel-like features". The San Remo's name is derived directly from a previous building on the site.

=== Previous structure ===
The construction of Central Park in the 1860s spurred construction on the Upper East Side of Manhattan, but similar development on the Upper West Side was slower to come. Major developments on the West Side were erected after the Ninth Avenue elevated line opened in 1879, providing direct access to Lower Manhattan. The first large apartment building in the area was the Dakota, which opened in 1884. The city installed power lines on Central Park West at the end of the 19th century, thus allowing the construction of multi-story apartment hotels with elevators.

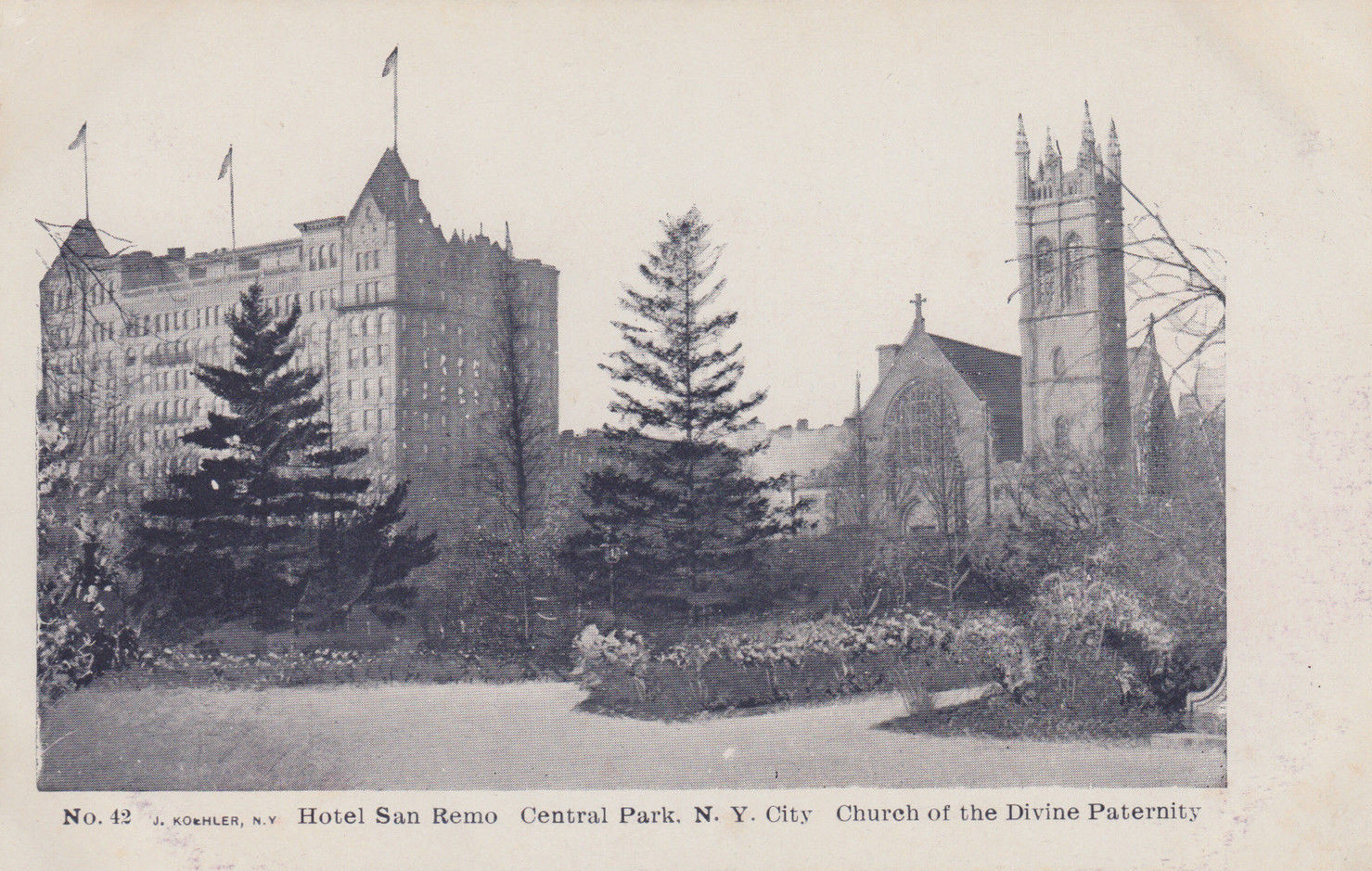
The original hotel structure next to the Church of the Divine Paternity in the late 1890s

Among the early apartment hotels was the original San Remo at 74th Street. The structure was built in 1891 by contractor Michael Brennan and designed by Edward L. Angell. The old San Remo was 11 stories tall with 90 apartments. It was decorated in the Gothic and Romanesque Revival styles and had peaked towers at its corners. The old San Remo was operated by Brennan following a dispute in 1892 with Wilson C. Morris, a hotel operator.

== Architecture ==
The present San Remo was designed by Emery Roth. It is variously described as being in the neo-Renaissance or late Italian Renaissance style. Theodore Hofstatter decorated the building's lobby, while Lou R. Strauss Jr. designed the internal garden and exterior landscaping. Unlike other large buildings on Central Park West, which were typically attributed to a single developer, no one took credit for developing the San Remo specifically. The syndicate that developed the San Remo had also erected the Beresford, seven blocks north, shortly before the San Remo was completed.

=== Form ===
The San Remo's base is 17 stories high and surrounds a T-shaped interior courtyard to the west, giving the lower stories a U-shaped plan. The presence of the courtyard allowed each apartment to receive natural light from several elevations.

There are setbacks at the 14th, 16th, and 17th stories. The setbacks are covered in slate and double as terraces for some units. Two towers rise an additional ten stories from the eastern portion of the base and are arranged symmetrically. The San Remo is one of four buildings on Central Park West with a twin-towered form; the others are the Century, the Majestic, and the El Dorado. (Note: Christopher Gray of The New York Times also characterizes the Beresford as having twin towers. The Beresford actually has three relatively short pinnacles, which contain water towers instead of apartments.) By splitting the upper stories into twin towers, as opposed to a single bulky tower, the developers could increase the amount of space that was near a window. To increase natural-light exposure to the upper-story apartments, the towers were designed in an "L" shape (wrapping around the courtyard), rather than as square masses. (Note: Both towers have an indentation facing the courtyard. The north tower has an indentation facing southwest, while the south tower has an indentation facing northwest.) Roth designed spires that were 400 ft (120 m) high; according to general contractor HRH Construction; this made the building one of New York City's tallest residential structures.

The massing of the San Remo, and those of similar buildings, was shaped primarily by the Multiple Dwelling Act of 1929. Under this legislation, the "street walls" of apartment buildings could rise one and a half times the width of the adjacent street before they had to set back. On lots of more than 25,000 ft^{2} (2,300 m^{2}), the street walls could rise three times the width of the adjacent street. Apartment buildings could rise up to 19 stories; additional stories were allowed on large plots, but the floor areas of these stories were limited to 20 percent of the lot area. These upper stories were allowed on plots of at least 30,000 ft^{2} (2,800 m^{2}) and were required to be set back 70 ft (21 m) on all sides. The San Remo was the earliest apartment building on Central Park West to be built with twin towers following the passage of the Multiple Dwelling Act of 1929.

=== Facade ===
The facade contains metal, stone, and terracotta decorations. These details include pilasters, engaged columns, rounded and triangular broken pediments, and balustrades, as well as smaller motifs such as roundels, scrolls, urns, cartouches, garlands, and consoles. The lowest three stories of the facade are made of rusticated blocks of limestone, while the rest of the building is clad with beige brick. The limestone blocks on the first and second stories are vermiculated. Above the base, there is a small amount of terracotta ornament, which is used to emphasize the otherwise plain brick facade. The ornament on the upper stories is oversized, allowing it to be seen from the ground.

All elevations of the facade are divided vertically into several bays. On the lower stories, the Central Park West elevation is divided into 26 bays from north to south, while the 75th Street elevation contains 16 bays and the 74th Street elevation contains 19 bays. There are two groupings of six bays near the north and south ends of the Central Park West elevation, as well as a three-bay-wide "pavilion" on either end. Additionally, the center bays on Central Park West are divided into three pairs, flanked by two single bays. Hence, the Central Park West elevation is divided in a 3-6-1-2-2-2-1-3 configuration. The six center bays and three outermost bays are treated as "pavilions", which rise above the setbacks. The towers are five bays wide on all elevations. A band course runs around the facade above the 13th story.

The windows on the primary elevations were divided horizontally into three tiers: a set of large movable casements, with movable transoms above and below. The casements and upper transoms swung outward, while the lower transoms swung inward. This design feature was intended to improve air circulation and temperature regulation, as air conditioning was uncommon when the building was completed. Roth anticipated that the upper and lower transoms would provide suitable air circulation most of the time and that the casements would only need to be opened on especially hot days. The windows on the rear elevations were arranged into multiple layouts, some of which have been altered.

==== Entrances ====
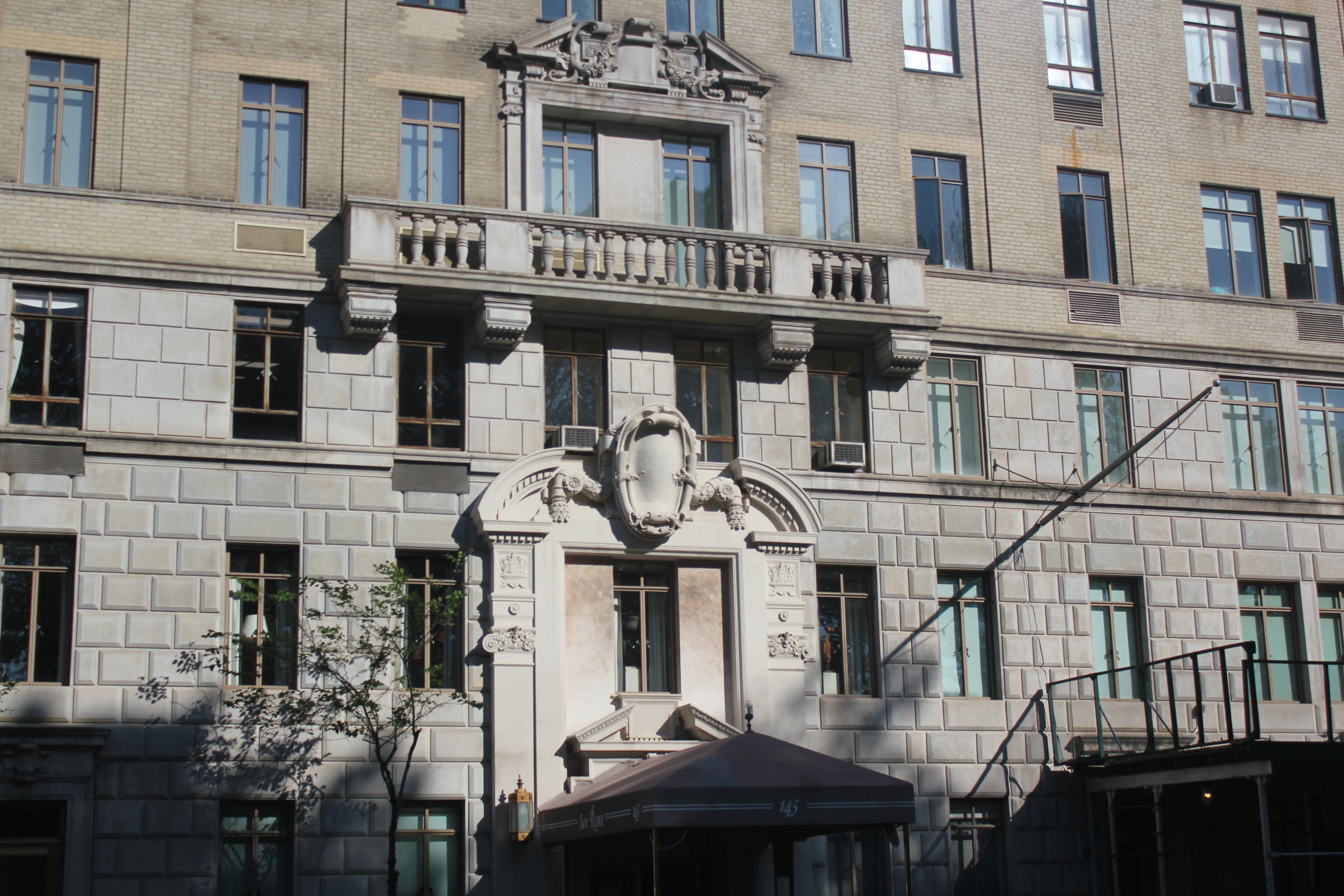
The southern entrance on 145 Central Park West

On the ground story, the Central Park West elevation has two main entrances, each two bays wide and placed in the middle of the six-bay-wide sections (bays 6–7 and 20–21 from south). Both entrances contain a set of bronze-and-glass double doors topped by a paneled bronze transom. Each door is divided into three glass panels with acanthus-leaf borders, as well as bronze medallions that resemble sunburst motifs. The sidewalk in front of each doorway is covered by a canopy. There are Art Deco metal-and-glass lanterns on either side of the doors. Above each set of doors is a triangular broken pediment and a single window on the second story. These entrances are surrounded by a limestone frame with pilasters on either side, which are topped by composite capitals. These pilasters support a curved broken pediment with corbels, as well as a central scrolled cartouche with garlands.

There are two secondary entrances: one in the 14th bay from east on 74th Street and the 13th bay from east on 75th Street. Each secondary entrance consists of a set of pilasters topped by a console table. A single bronze-and-glass door, similar in design to those on Central Park West, is recessed deeply within either entrance. There are metal-and-glass lanterns on either side of the doors. Above each doorway is a scrolled cartouche.

There are also nine entrances to individual offices on the ground floor: four on Central Park West, three on 74th Street, and two on 75th Street. (Note: The office entrances on Central Park West are on either side of the six-bay-wide sections, in bays 3, 10, 17, and 24 (counting from south). The doors on 74th Street are in bays 6 and 17, while those on 75th Street are bays 4, 8, and 15 (both counting from east).) Each doorway contains a single door, recessed within the rusticated limestone facade. The bronze-and-glass office doors are simple in design and are topped by a bronze-and-glass transom panel. On the far western end of the 74th and 75th Street frontages, there is a short standalone wall of rusticated blocks, which contains an archway topped by a rusticated keystone. There is a metal service gate below each archway, topped by a panel with the word "service". The westernmost end of the 74th Street frontage, next to the service gate, contains a metal fence atop a brick parapet, which encloses an unused courtyard.

==== Lower stories ====
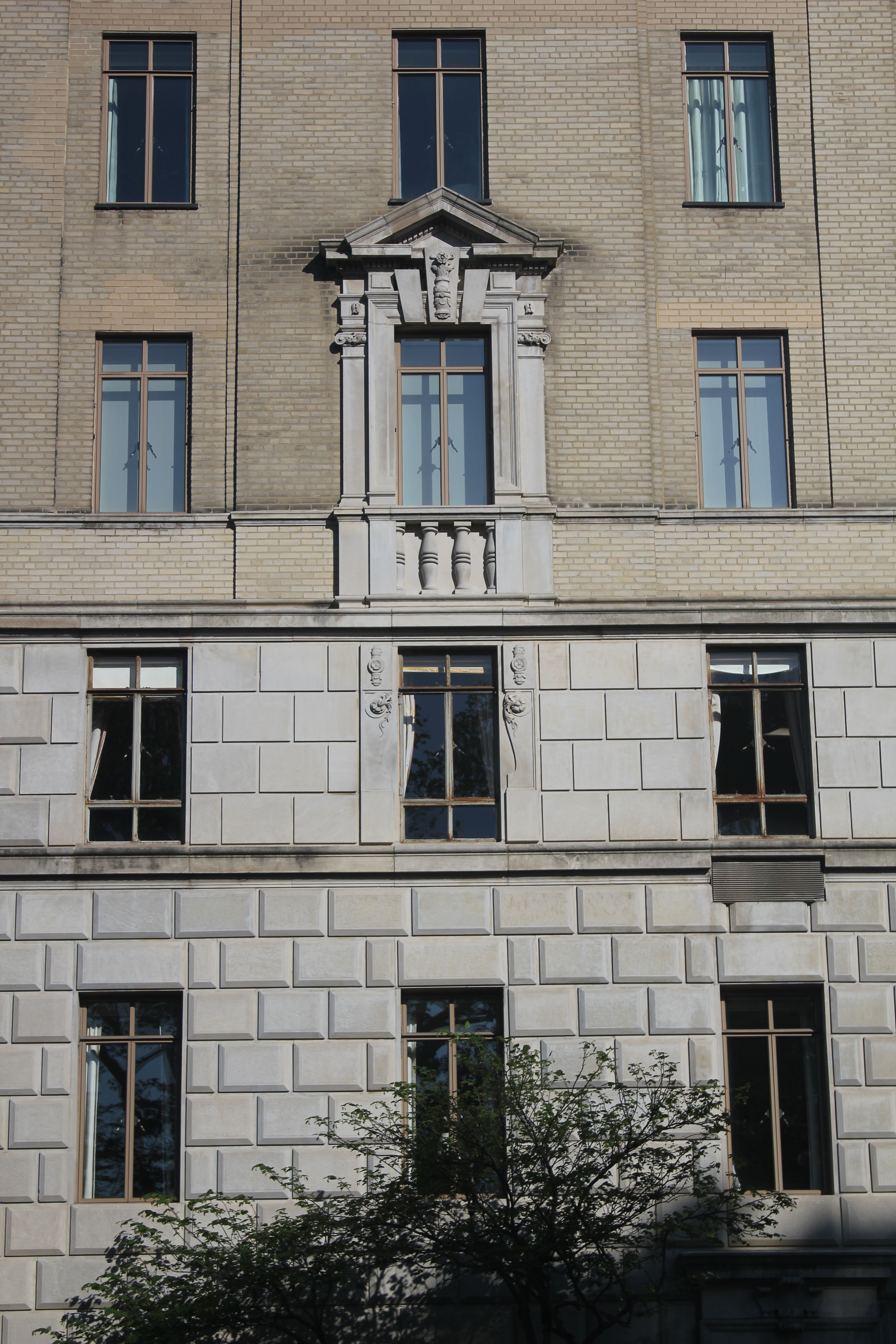
View of bays 1–3 on Central Park West at the second through fifth stories

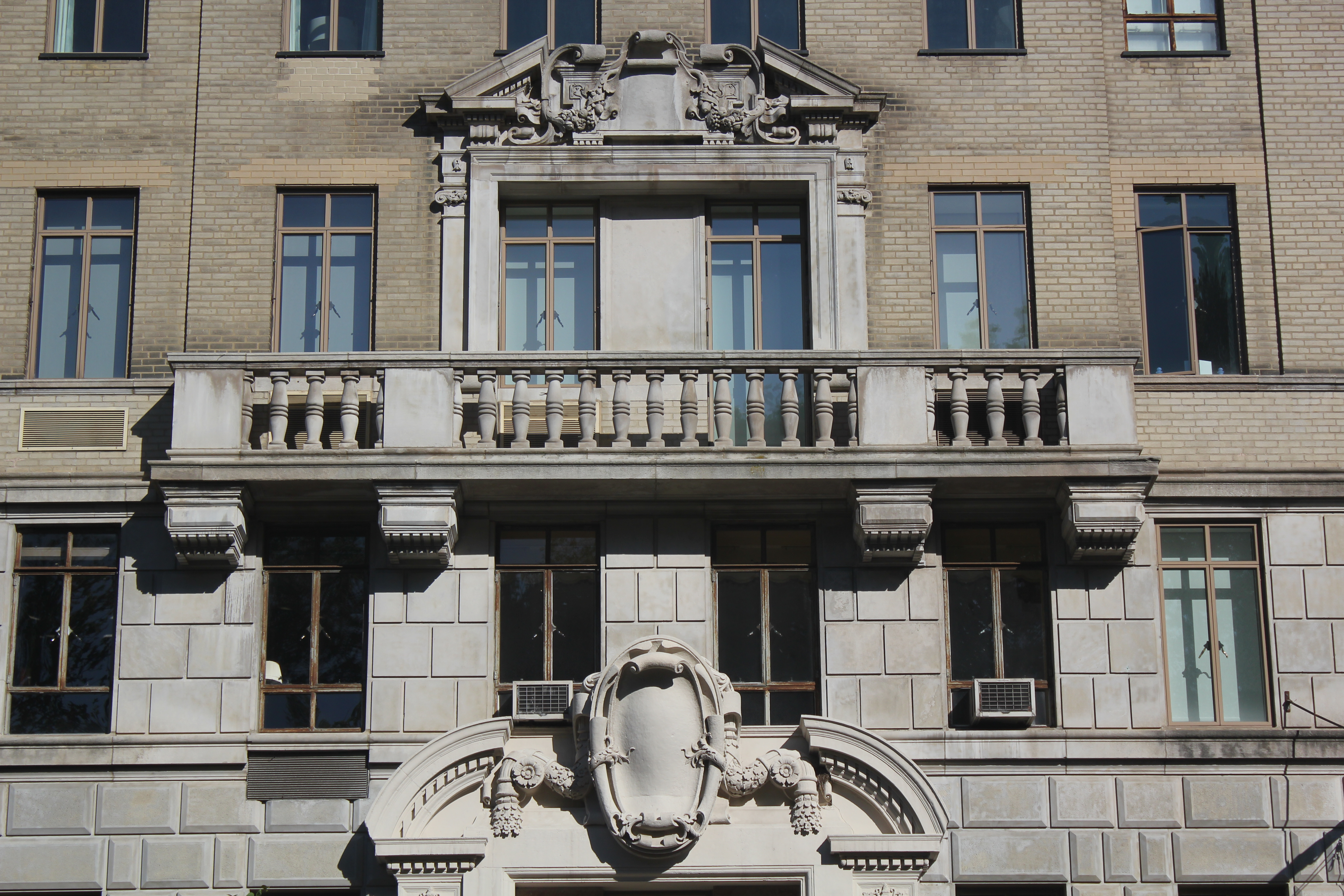
View of bays 5–8 from south at the third and fourth stories. Behind the balcony, bays 6–7 are surrounded by a limestone frame and separated from each other by a limestone wall panel. Above this frame is a triangular broken pediment.

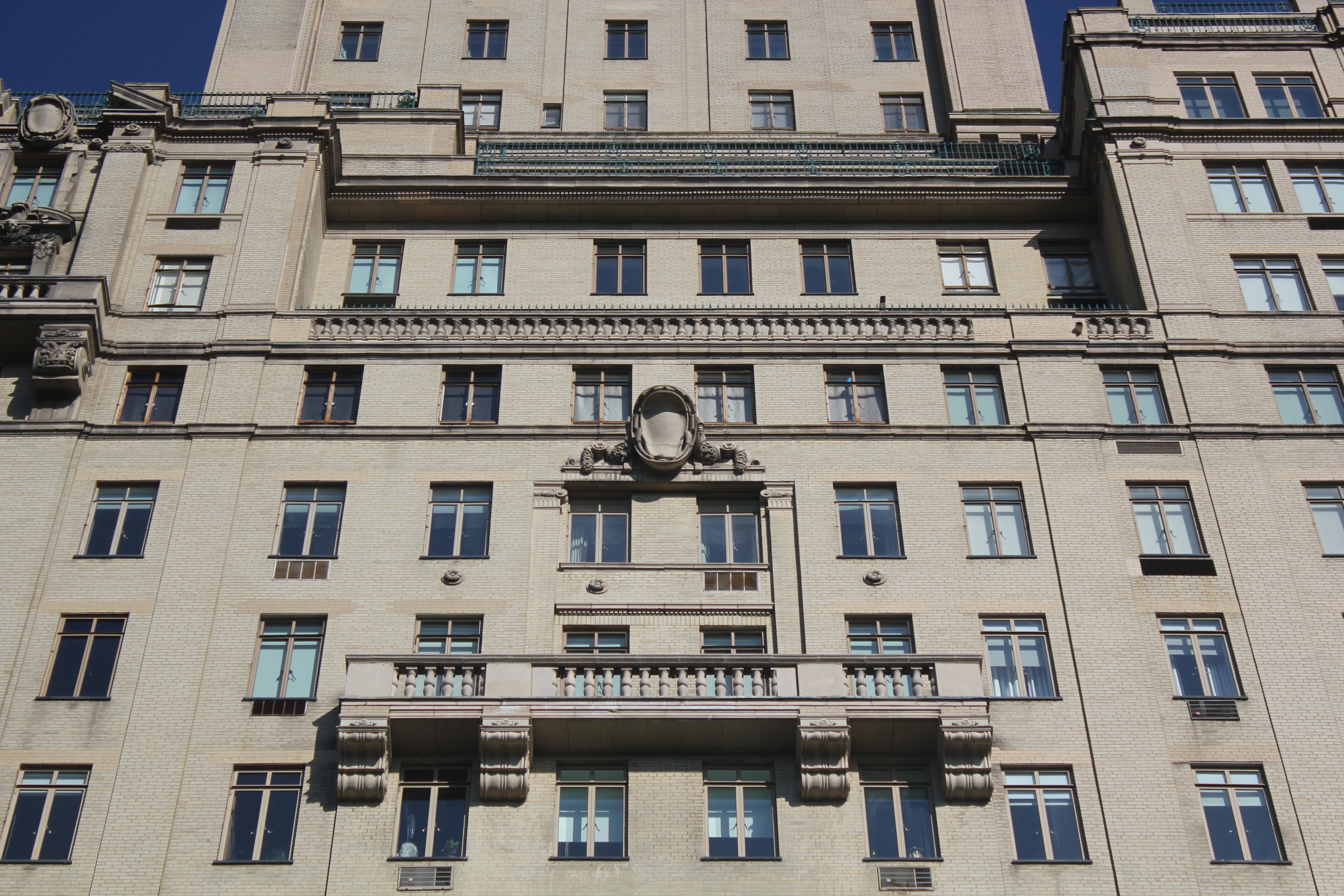
View of bays 5–8 at the 11th through 15th stories. Behind the balcony, bays 6–7 are recessed at the 11th and 12th stories and are flanked by brick pilasters. Above the 12th story, and between bays 6–7, is a cartouche with rosettes.

The second-easternmost bays on 74th and 75th Streets (bays 2–3) and the second-outermost bays on Central Park West (bays 2–3 and 24–25) have ornately decorated windows on the third and fourth stories. The third-story windows in these bays are flanked by limestone frames with rosettes and consoles; these support small balustrades at the fourth story. On either side of the second-outermost windows on all three elevations, a set of pilasters supports an entablature and a triangular broken pediment, both with dentils. There is a central keystone inside the pediment. Above the 13th story, there are console brackets flanking each of the second-outermost windows, above which is a balcony with a balustrade. These bays are flanked by brick pilasters at the 14th and 15th stories, which support large curved broken pediments and a scrolled escutcheon above the 15th story. There are rosettes at the tops of each pilaster. There are smaller curved broken pediments above the 14th-story windows, with escutcheons at the center as well as floral decorations and garlands below.

On Central Park West, bays 5–8 and 19–22 contain balconies at the fourth story. The balconies project from the facade and are supported by four console brackets. Behind each balcony, the two middle openings (bays 6–7 and 20–21) are surrounded by a limestone frame and separated from each other by a limestone wall panel. Above this frame is a triangular broken pediment with an escutcheon, garland, and tablet at its center. In bays 5–8 and 19–22 on the 11th story, there are two more balconies supported by four console brackets. Behind each balcony, bays 6–7 and 20–21 are recessed at the 11th and 12th stories and are flanked by brick pilasters; the recessed walls are decorated with embossed rosettes. Above the 12th story, and between bays 6–7 and 20–21, are cartouches with rosettes, similar to those above the main entrances on Central Park West.

There is another cartouche above the center of the fourth story on Central Park West, corresponding to bays 13–14. The numbers "19" and "30" flank the cartouche, signifying the year of the building's completion. Above the 13th story, there are console brackets flanking bays 13–14, above which is a balcony with a balustrade. At the 14th and 15th stories, bays 13–14 merge into a single bay, which is flanked by brick pilasters and designed much like the second-outermost bays. The cartouche above the 15th story is flanked by a curved broken pediment instead of a triangular one. Additionally, the brick pilasters extend to the 16th and 17th stories; there are rosettes at the tops of each pilaster. The window on the 16th story is topped by a tablet with garlands and a broken triangular pediment, while that on the 17th story is capped by a cartouche.

==== Towers ====
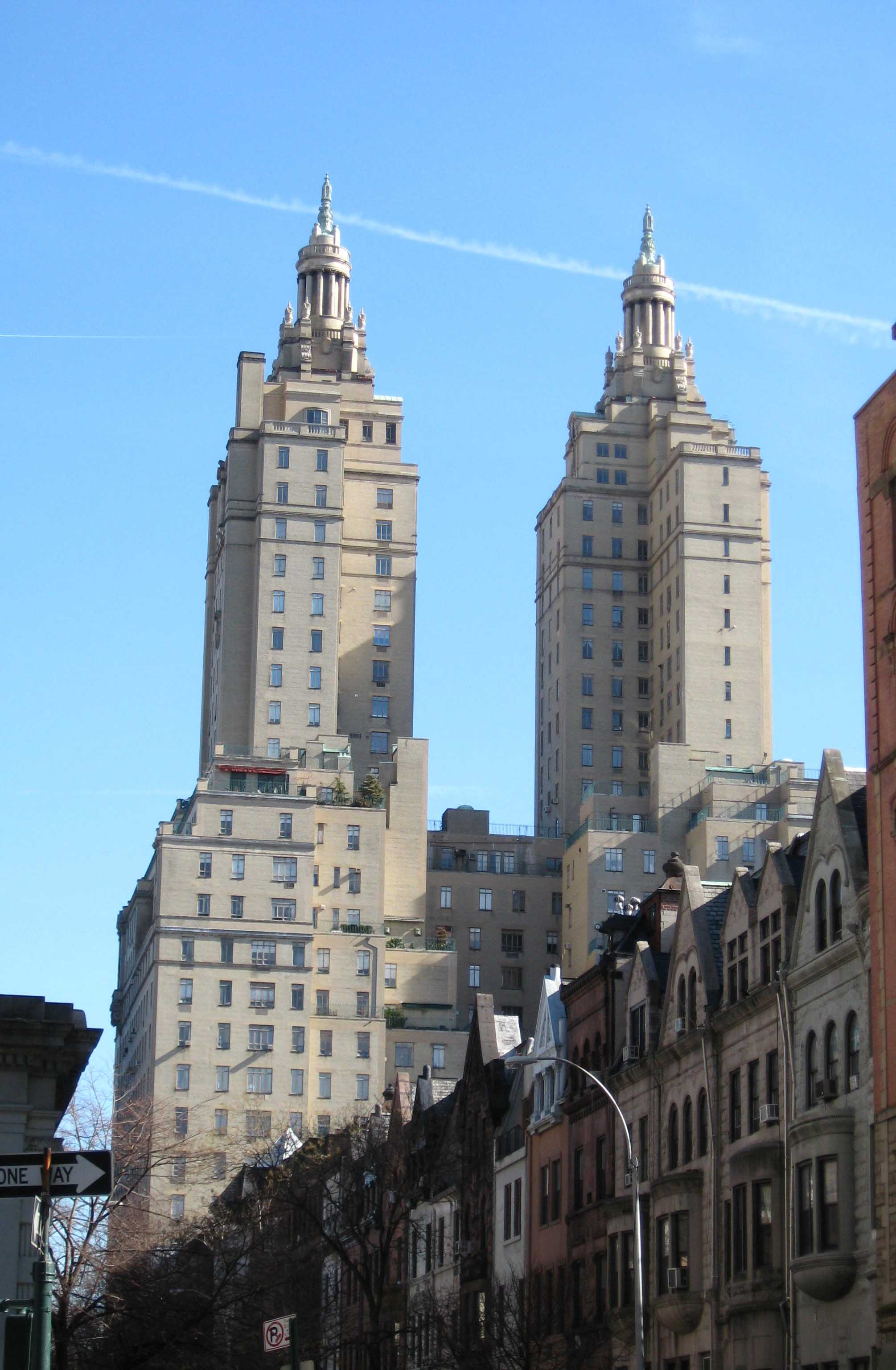
The towers of the San Remo as seen from the west

The towers above the 17th story are five bays wide and contain protruding piers at each corner. The north tower's northern and eastern elevations, as well as the south tower's southern and eastern elevations, contain ornamentation on the upper halves of each tower. On the 23rd story, the central windows on each of these four elevations contain ornate frames and are topped by curved broken pediments with keystones. On the 26th and 27th stories, the three center bays of these elevations are ornately decorated. The center bay of each grouping is flanked by a pair of double-height engaged columns; these are supported by projecting brackets at the 26th story and are topped by foliate capitals above the 27th story. The outer bays of each grouping are flanked by flat pilasters, which are also topped by foliate capitals. Above the 27th story, there is a curved broken pediment with a cartouche in the center bay, as well as a triangular broken pediment in either of the outer bays.

Both towers contain a triple-level penthouse section above the 27th story. On the 29th story of both towers, corresponding to the second level of the penthouse, the northern, southern, and eastern elevations each contain a window within a limestone frame. This window is flanked by pilasters with rosettes on their capitals. On the 30th story, there are three protruding dormers on either tower, each with a single window and a rounded roof. The top and bottom edges of the dormer windows are rounded. There are console brackets flanking each dormer window, above which is a curved pediment.

Each tower is topped by a "temple" designed in the Corinthian order. According to Steven Ruttenbaum, the temples were patterned after the Choragic Monument of Lysicrates. The base of the temple is quadrilateral and contains eight large pedestals (two on each side). The pedestals contain console brackets, and the tops of the pedestals are decorated with urns and garlands; the finials of the urns measure 8 ft (2.4 m) tall. Between the pedestals on each side, there are cartouches with balustrades above them. The temples themselves rest on brick podiums and contain circular colonnades of smooth columns. Each column in the colonnade measures 16 ft (4.9 m) tall. Above the colonnades are friezes with dentils, as well as a terrace enclosed by a balustrade. Above the terrace level, a circular podium supports a set of console brackets, atop which is an electric copper lantern with windows on four sides. The lantern is 22 ft (6.7 m) tall.

=== Features ===
==== Lobbies ====
Each of the entrances on Central Park West leads to its own lobby. The floors of each lobby are composed of large square tiles of beige terrazzo, each of which contains a smaller inlaid gray-marble tile. The beige terrazzo tiles are surrounded by a multicolored band of mosaic tiles and a dark-green marble border. The lower sections of the lobbies' walls are wainscoted in oxblood red and beige, while the remainder of the lobby walls are a salmon-beige color with inlaid dark-brown panels. The walls are flat and contain red-and-brown marble doorways leading to various rooms, as well as lighting sconces made of glass and metal. There are "art glass" windows on the walls, overlooking the courtyard. The ceilings have elaborate bas-reliefs and contain flat, vaulted, and sloped surfaces. The ceiling originally had a polychrome color scheme, which was painted white in subsequent years. Hanging from the ceilings are metal-and-glass chandeliers shaped like inverted pyramids.

There are ten elevators in the San Remo, grouped into four banks. There are square-headed archways leading from each lobby to each set of elevators; the lintels are decorated with multicolored marble panels. Each of the elevator doors in the lobbies is made of bronze with geometric motifs.

==== Apartments ====
As of 2022, the New York City Department of City Planning cites the San Remo as having 138 residential apartments and 8 non-residential units. Initially, there were 122 apartments in the building. Each apartment was designed with six to sixteen rooms, including single-story and double-story apartments. Each of the 17 lowest stories generally contained seven apartments per floor. Three of these units faced Central Park West and had eight, ten, or eleven rooms, while two units each faced 74th and 75th Streets, with six to eight rooms. This contrasted with other buildings on Central Park West, where four units on each floor shared a frontage on Central Park. A 1940 news article described the building as containing 132 apartments with five to fourteen rooms, with a total of 1,000 rooms. In the basement, each resident had their own laundry room, which was covered in tiles.

In larger apartments, common rooms such as the living room were arranged around a central gallery. A short hallway led to bedrooms in the rear, providing privacy for residents. The developers advertised the building as having atypically large rooms. (Note: According to Ruttenbaum 1986, p. 138, the maximum room dimensions were as follows: Entrance galleries: 12 by 33 ft (3.7 by 10.1 m); Living rooms: 22 by 36 ft (6.7 by 11.0 m); Dining rooms: 18 by 27 ft (5.5 by 8.2 m); Libraries: 16 by 27 ft (4.9 by 8.2 m); Bedrooms: 16 by 24 ft (4.9 by 7.3 m); Dressing rooms (adjacent to master bedrooms): 12 by 12 ft (3.7 by 3.7 m); The smallest bedroom was 12 by 15 ft (3.7 by 4.6 m).) There were several closets in each apartment, and the master bedroom of each unit also adjoined a dressing room. There were butlers' pantries and maids' rooms leading off each kitchen. Some of the westernmost units also contained "sun rooms", which measured up to 8 by 14 ft (2.4 by 4.3 m). Over the years, apartment layouts have been modified to accommodate the needs of individual tenants, and obliquely shaped spaces such as semicircular dining rooms were also created.

In the tower stories, each apartment originally occupied an entire floor. The original plans had called for five duplex units in the south tower, each with thirteen rooms across two stories, and ten simplex units in the north tower, each with six rooms on a single story. The lower level of each south-tower unit contained a library, dining room, kitchen, pantry, and two maids' rooms. (Note: According to Ruttenbaum 1986, p. 140, the dining room of each south-tower apartment measured 11 by 17 ft (3.4 by 5.2 m). The living room had windows on three sides and measured 22 by 36 ft (6.7 by 11.0 m).) A spiral staircase led up to four bedrooms and three maids' rooms on the upper level, thus providing a clear separation of "public" and "private" rooms. With the exception of the topmost unit, the south-tower duplexes were all split into two single-story units during the 1930s, each containing seven rooms. Some of the tower apartments have been combined and expanded over the years. For instance, musician Bono combined the 27th floor of the north tower with a portion of the former mechanical space above it, creating a 3,500 sq ft (330 m^{2}) duplex with 1,300 sq ft (120 m^{2}) of terraces. The duplex atop the south tower was also combined with the mechanical space above it in the 2010s, forming a triplex unit.

All of the ceilings are suspended from the structural beams and finished in plaster. Some ceilings have molded plaster reliefs, although even the simplest ceilings had molded plaster cornices. Ceiling heights varied in different rooms: larger rooms had ceilings of up to 11 ft (3.4 m), while smaller rooms had shorter ceilings. Some apartments were subdivided in the 1930s and decorated with similar details. There are wood-burning fireplaces in the living rooms, with ornate fireplace mantels. The fireplaces were inefficient and outdated at the time of their construction, but they were nonetheless included for symbolic reasons. Roth designed steel-and-glass cabinets for the kitchens, which also had cork floors, tiled walls, and chromium-plated plumbing pipes. Underneath one window in each kitchen, there were compartments where fresh food could be stored; these compartments had vents facing outdoors. Each bathroom was tiled in a polychrome color scheme.

== History ==
By the late 1920s, high-rise apartment buildings were being developed on Central Park West in anticipation of the completion of the New York City Subway's Eighth Avenue Line, which opened in 1932. Central Park West was concurrently widened from 48 to 63 ft (15 to 19 m). Under the Multiple Dwelling Act of 1929, this allowed the construction of proportionally taller buildings on the avenue. Just before the passage of the act, Emery Roth had designed the Beresford, seven blocks north of the old San Remo Hotel. In contrast to the San Remo, the Beresford had three towers, which were octagonal and relatively short.

=== Development ===
The New York Herald Tribune reported in mid-November 1928 that the original San Remo Hotel might be replaced with a 30-story apartment hotel. Two weeks later, a syndicate led by Henry M. Pollock bought the old San Remo from the Brennan estate, as well as several adjacent four-story houses to the west. The Pollock group planned to spend $7 million on a new building on the site. In April 1929, the Times Holding Corporation (which owned the San Remo Hotel) acquired a house at 4 West 75th Street. The firm planned to raze the house, which occupied part of the footprint of the new building's courtyard. The San Remo Hotel closed the same month, and the Ravitch Brothers filed plans for a new apartment hotel on the same site. That July, San Remo Towers Inc. transferred a $5 million mortgage loan on the new building to the Bank of United States. Within a month, leasing agents Pease & Elliman were renting out apartments at the new San Remo.

The San Remo Hotel had been demolished by September 1929, and the site of the new building was being excavated. The next month, Emery Roth filed plans for a 16-story apartment building on the site of the San Remo Hotel to cost $2.5 million. The plans were subsequently revised to a 26-story building, and the HRH Construction Corporation was hired that December as the general contractor.

The Bank of United States provided a $5 million loan in January 1930 to City Financial Corporation, one of its subsidiaries, which owned the building. The bank acquired 100 shares of San Remo Towers Inc. for about $1 million as part of a larger, $8 million transaction. By then, L. J. Phillips & Co. had taken over as the building's leasing agent. The San Remo ultimately cost $5.5 million to construct. HRH was paid $125,000 for its role as general contractor at the San Remo. HRH also agreed to manage the San Remo (as well as the Beresford, which it also built) in exchange for two percent of the buildings' gross profits. In a New York Herald Tribune article on September 14, 1930, the HRH Construction Company indicated that the San Remo would open that October.

=== Rental house ===
==== Opening and receivership ====
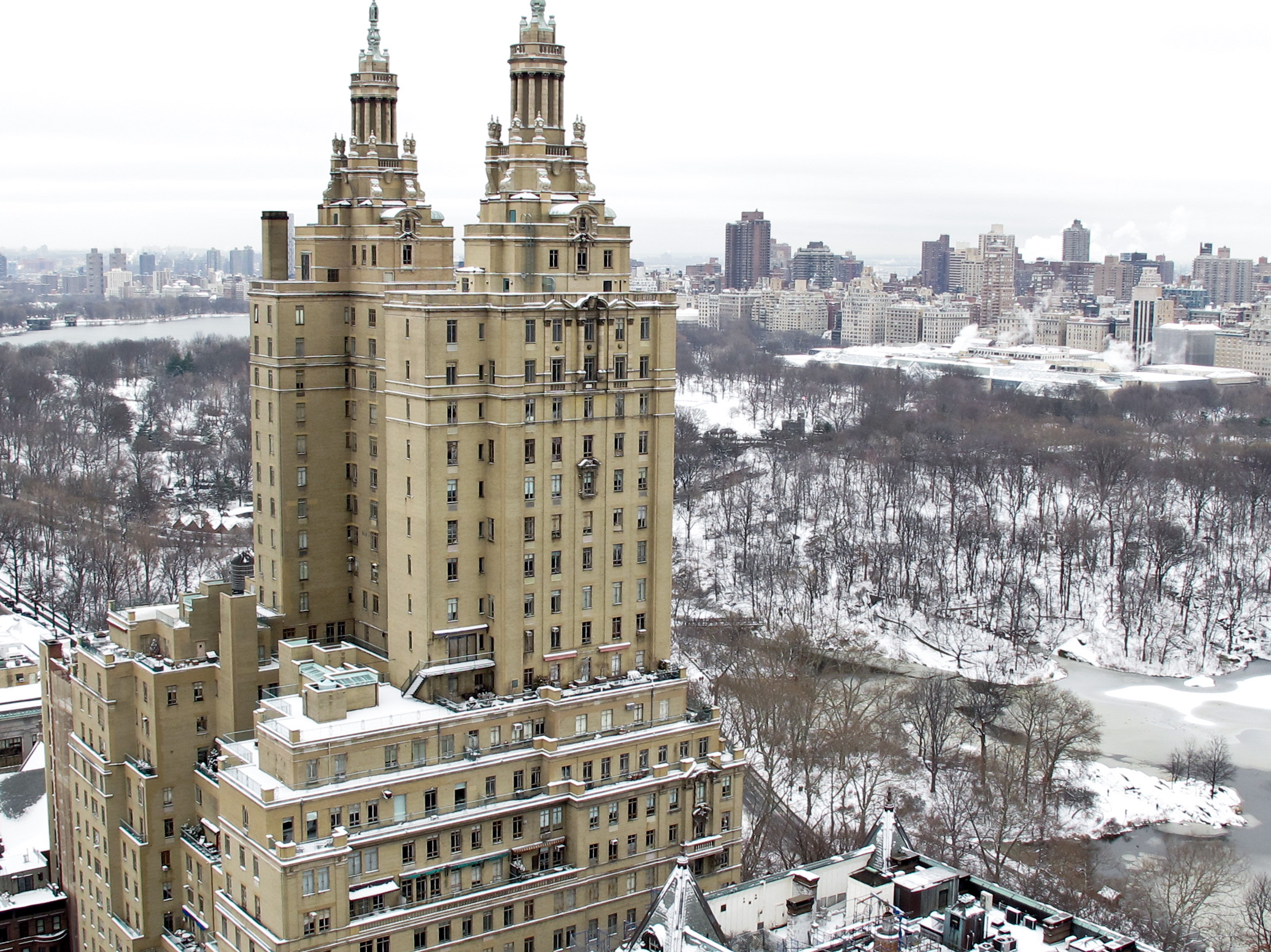
The San Remo after a snowstorm

The building was completed on September 21, 1930. The developers advertised the San Remo as "The Aristocrat of Central Park West". Almost immediately, the San Remo experienced financial issues, despite critical acclaim in the architectural media. The surrounding area had suffered after the Wall Street Crash of 1929, and shantytowns were built directly across the street from the San Remo during the Great Depression. After the Bank of United States experienced a bank run in December 1930, it shut down and its top officials were charged with recklessly using depositors' funds for speculation. The New York State Banking Department took over the bank's holdings, including the San Remo's mortgage. Early the next month, contractors placed $423,000 worth of liens against San Remo Inc., and the Bank of United States moved to foreclose on the building's $5 million mortgage loan. Joseph Ravitch, head of HRH Construction, testified that the bank and its affiliates owed him $40,000 for the San Remo's construction. In April 1931, a court-appointed receiver for the San Remo received permission to borrow $60,000 to pay the building's property taxes.

In spite of all these issues, a broker claimed in mid-1931 that large apartments at the San Remo were being steadily rented. Following further negotiations, the Banking Department liquidated all claims against the San Remo except for its own lien. The Banking Department announced in October 1931 that it would foreclose on the building. At the time, 88 of the 128 apartments had been rented, representing 70 percent of the units. These tenants paid an estimated $513,000 annually, more than sufficient to cover the operating costs. In early 1932, a court-appointed referee recommended that the building and land be sold together. The San Remo was placed for sale at a foreclosure auction that February, and the Bank of United States (still part of the Banking Department) acquired the building, bidding $1,021,000. In December 1932, the bank gave a new first-mortgage loan of $1.5 million to the San Remo Realty Company, a subsidiary of the bank that had taken over the building.

==== 1930s to early 1970s ====
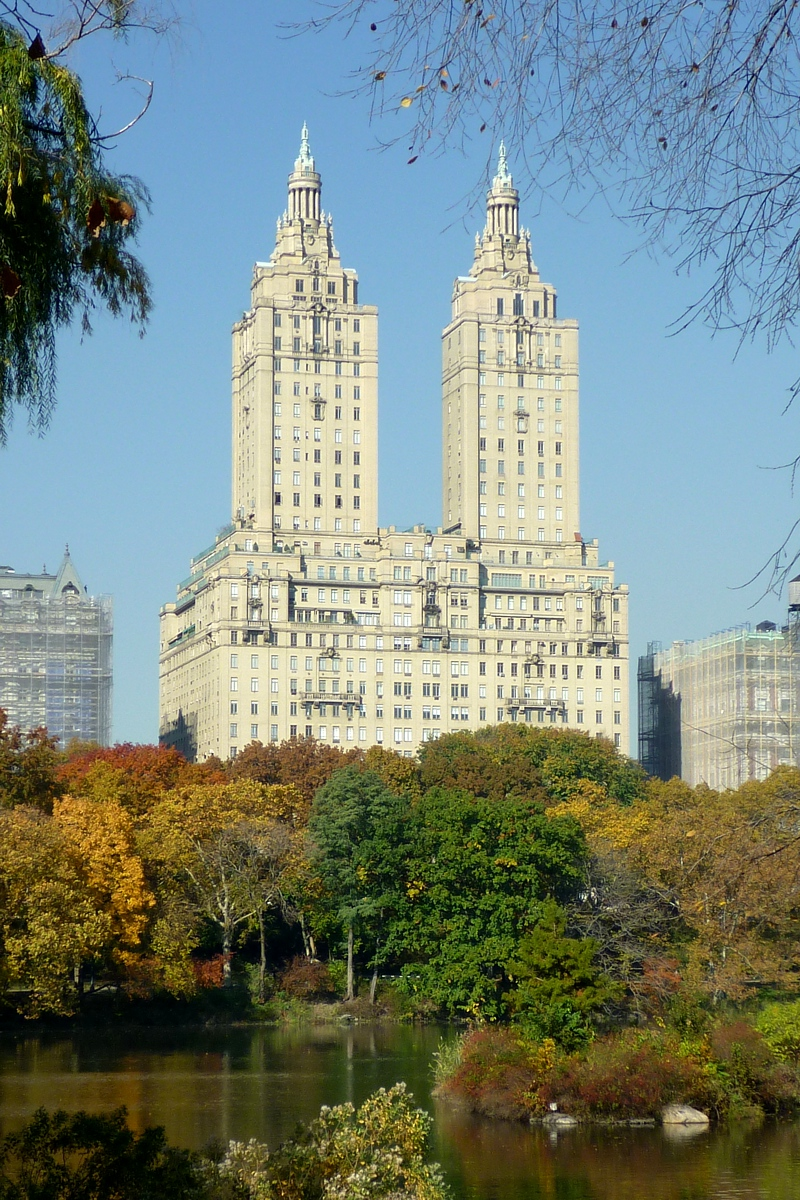
Seen from across the Ramble and Lake in Central Park

Throughout the Depression, the building went bankrupt several times and passed to numerous owners. The owners reduced rents and created 20 additional apartments by subdividing four of the duplexes in the south tower and some vacant units at the base. The Banking Department announced in July 1935 that it would refinance the building with a $3.1 million loan from the Metropolitan Life Insurance Company and would use the funds to distribute dividends to the Bank of United States' depositors. Some creditors expressed opposition to the mortgage, but a representative of the Banking Department said the state government wished to sell the building and that a mortgage would facilitate such a sale. A state judge approved the mortgage that September. By 1938, there were 117 families in the building. As the state was trying to find a buyer for the building, its staff went on strike in March 1938 and again in November 1938. The journalist Peter Osnos wrote that the San Remo and other Central Park West apartment houses contained many Jewish residents during the 1930s and 1940s, since these buildings were not "restricted", unlike others on the East Side.

In July 1940, a group of anonymous investors acquired the San Remo and Beresford, assuming a combined $7.4 million in mortgages on the two structures. The buildings themselves cost only $25,000, although they had cost a combined $10 million to build. One observer likened the sale to "buying the Queen Mary and the Queen Elizabeth for pocket change". The investment group was known as the Sanbere Corporation, a portmanteau of the two buildings' names. The San Remo's staff occasionally went on strike, such as in 1942 and in 1950. The San Remo also had twenty rooms for maids, many of which had been converted to tenant storage spaces or offices by the early 1960s.

By the mid-1960s, a dozen apartment buildings on Central Park West had been converted into housing cooperatives. At the end of the decade, Harry B. Helmsley and his partner Lawrence Wien proposed converting the San Remo into a cooperative. Helmsley had an option to acquire the San Remo for $12 million and planned to sell it to tenants for $15 million. Most residents supported the idea of a co-op conversion, but 86 percent of residents objected that the prices for each apartment, at over $100,000 each, were far too high. A group of tenants organized to express opposition to the proposal. Helmsley and Wien withdrew their plan in June 1970 because not enough residents had purchased shares in the cooperative, despite having lowered the prices for each apartment. For the offering to go into effect, at least 35 percent of the residents had to buy shares. Helmsley lost $1.25 million in the process, amid a weakening market for co-op apartments, and the San Remo reverted to its previous owners.

=== Cooperative conversion ===
==== 1970s to 1990s ====
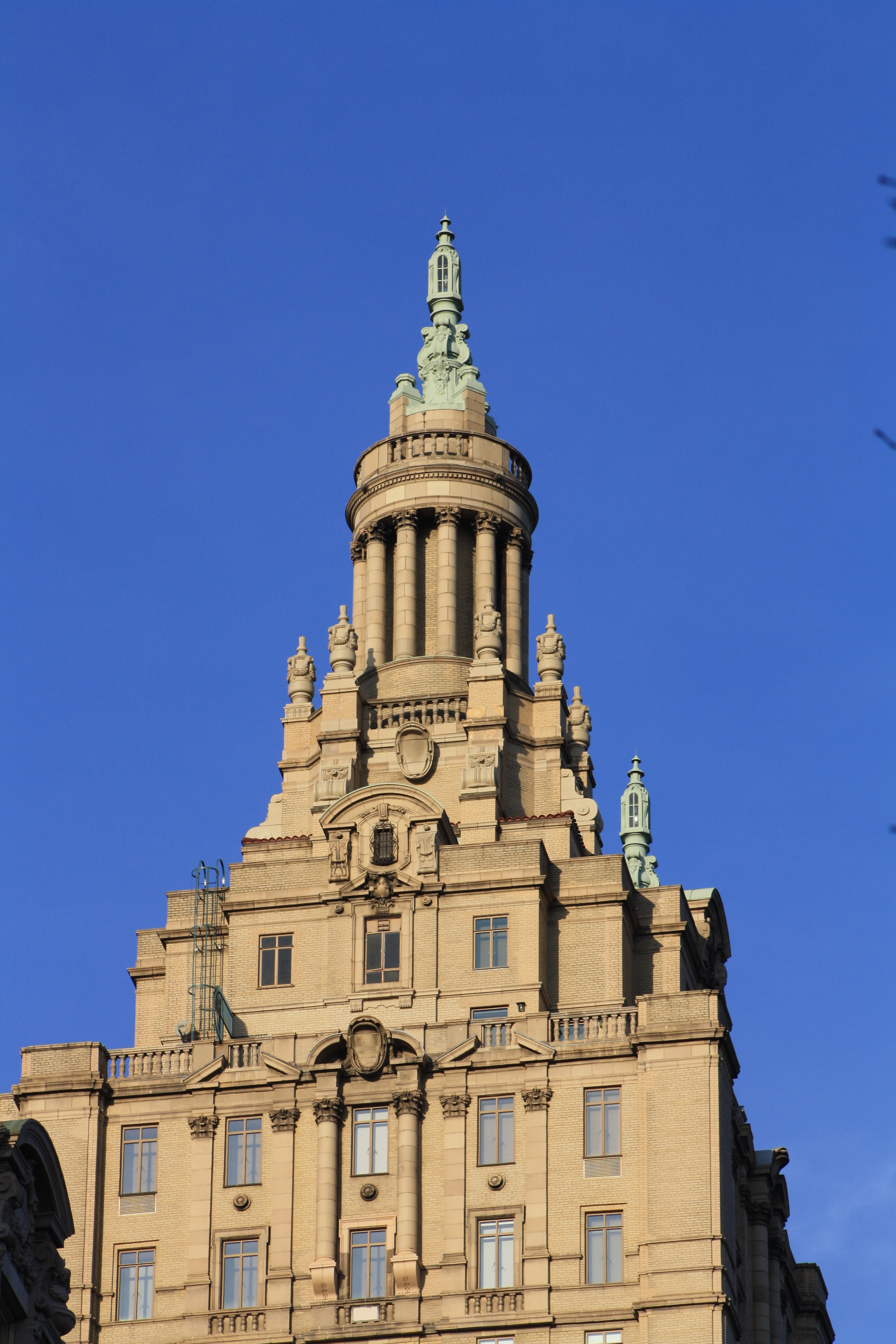
Detailed view of the colonnades on one of the San Remo's pinnacles

An investment syndicate, the Nominee Realty Corporation, bought the building for $9 million in July 1971. Nominee Realty did not originally intend to convert the building into a co-op, but it agreed to sell the building to its tenants to reduce costs. The tenants released a $10.8 million co-op offering plan in May 1972, including a $1 million contingency fund. About 85 percent of tenants bought shares in the cooperative within four months, and the co-op offering went into effect in September 1972. The co-op board initially did not seek official city-landmark status for the building, as that would have raised the cost of maintenance. The building retained most of its original windows, except for two upper-story apartments, where the windows were replaced with single panes in the early 1970s. Afterward, the San Remo's co-op board banned window replacements in anticipation of a potential city-landmark designation. Paul Goldberger, president of the co-op board, said the board members had a "self-imposed tradition of treating the building as if it were a landmark".

The San Remo's co-op board began restoring the facade in the early 1980s. The terracotta details atop the building's temples were replicated in lightweight concrete. All other terracotta was preserved or replaced in the same material. The New York City Landmarks Preservation Commission (LPC) designated the San Remo as a city landmark in March 1987. As a result, the LPC was obliged to review all proposed changes to the exterior. The board planned to replace the multi-paned windows with three-pane windows that resembled the original design. Due to the high cost of renovating the windows, the San Remo's co-op board decided to replace the windows only when apartments had been vacated. The exterior restoration ultimately lasted about one decade.

By 1996, units in buildings on Central Park West were in high demand. For instance, one unit in the San Remo was purchased after being listed for just three days, while another unit received an unusually high number of inquiries from Upper East Side residents. Another renovation of the exterior began in the late 1990s. The south tower had been restored by the end of 1999, and work on the north tower was scheduled to be conducted.

==== 2000s to present ====
The San Remo's board voted in 2000 to impose a six-month time limit for apartment renovations, imposing heavy fines on residents who violated the rule. Many residents had complained that director Steven Spielberg and entrepreneur Steve Jobs were conducting multi-year renovations of their respective apartments. In 2006, the San Remo's co-op board banned residents from using fireplaces. By the end of the decade, prices exceeded $3 million even for comparatively small apartments with two bedrooms. Some residents owned their apartments for long periods. When an apartment in the south tower was placed for sale in 2010, only one south-tower apartment had been sold in the preceding 16 years. In another case in 2011, the previous owner had resided in the apartment since the 1950s.

The San Remo attracted many residents in the entertainment industry, especially as compared to other Central Park West buildings, where wealthy people lived in relative obscurity. By the 2010s, many of the celebrities who had lived in the San Remo had moved out, and a growing proportion of residents worked in the finance industry. Among the remaining celebrities in the San Remo in 2017 were musician Bono and actor Steve Martin.

== Residents ==
According to a 1996 article in New York magazine, many brokers classified the San Remo as one of five top-tier apartment buildings on Central Park West, largely because of its high concentration of celebrities and its views of the Lake in Central Park. The others were 88 Central Park West, 101 Central Park West, the Dakota, and the Beresford. The Real Deal wrote in 2017: "The building's individuality, its willingness to boast, is [...] reflected in its high-profile residents." Notable residents have included:

- Diane Arbus, photographer
- Harold Arlen, composer
- Diana Balmori, architect; lived with César Pelli
- Elaine Barrymore, actress; lived with John Barrymore
- John Barrymore, actor; lived with Elaine Barrymore
- Warren Beatty, actor; shuttled between Diane Keaton in the south tower and Mary Tyler Moore in the north
- Marilyn Berger, columnist
- Bono, musician
- Marshall Brickman, writer
- Eddie Cantor, actor
- Kate Capshaw, actress; lived with Steven Spielberg
- Glenn Close, actress
- Jack Dempsey, restaurateur and retired boxer
- Norman Dorsen, President of the ACLU
- Fred Ebb, lyricist
- Gary David Goldberg, screenwriter
- Paul Goldberger, architecture critic
- Rita Hayworth, actress
- Don Hewitt, television news producer
- Dustin Hoffman, actor
- Mick Jagger, musician
- Donna Karan, fashion designer
- Diane Keaton, actress
- Yasmin Aga Khan, philanthropist
- Barry Manilow, singer-songwriter
- Steve Martin, actor
- Peter W. May, businessman
- Mitch Miller, musician
- Demi Moore, actress; lived with Bruce Willis
- Mary Tyler Moore, actress
- James L. Nederlander, theater director
- Cesar Pelli, architect; lived with Diana Balmori
- Tony Randall, actor
- Ernö Rapée, orchestra conductor
- Scott Rudin, producer
- Thomas Secunda, co-founder of Bloomberg L.P.
- Stephen Sondheim, composer
- Steven Spielberg, director and screenwriter; lived with Kate Capshaw.
- Billy Squier, musician
- Isaac Stern, violinist
- Nathan Straus, businessman
- Robert Stigwood, producer
- Victoria Tennant, actress
- Laurie Tisch, philanthropist
- Andrew Tobias, writer
- Carl Van Vechten, photographer
- Albert Warner, film executive
- Bruce Willis, actor; lived with Demi Moore
- Robert Wilson, philanthropist; died in 2013 after jumping from his apartment
- Tiger Woods, golfer

The San Remo's co-op board has a reputation for "lenient admissions standards" compared to the conservative, old-money boards on the other side of the park. Nonetheless, in 1985, the co-op board voted against allowing performer Madonna to buy an apartment in the building. Tenants cited concerns that Madonna's presence would attract paparazzi, although, at the time, nude pictures of her had recently circulated in Playboy and Penthouse magazines. Madonna ultimately bought another apartment on Central Park West; the San Remo's board eventually approved her application more than two decades later, in 2008. The co-op board also voted against allowing fashion designer Calvin Klein to move into the San Remo. Steve Jobs bought and renovated a penthouse apartment but never lived in it, ultimately selling it to Bono in 2003.

In the early 21st century, residents of the San Remo were among the biggest donors to the U.S. Democratic Party, and resident Andrew Tobias was treasurer of the Democratic National Committee. The San Remo's residents donated more to the John Kerry 2004 presidential campaign than residents of any other building in the United States, giving Kerry $192,000 by April 2004. During that election, The New York Observer described the San Remo as "the financial anchor for New York's left coast", because contributions from the San Remo overwhelmingly went to Democratic candidates. In September 2012, New York Times columnists wrote "for the past few elections, the San Remo has been an ATM for Democratic presidential campaigns", though contributions through July 2012 favored Romney over Obama, $331,625 to $101,367.

== Impact ==
=== Reception ===
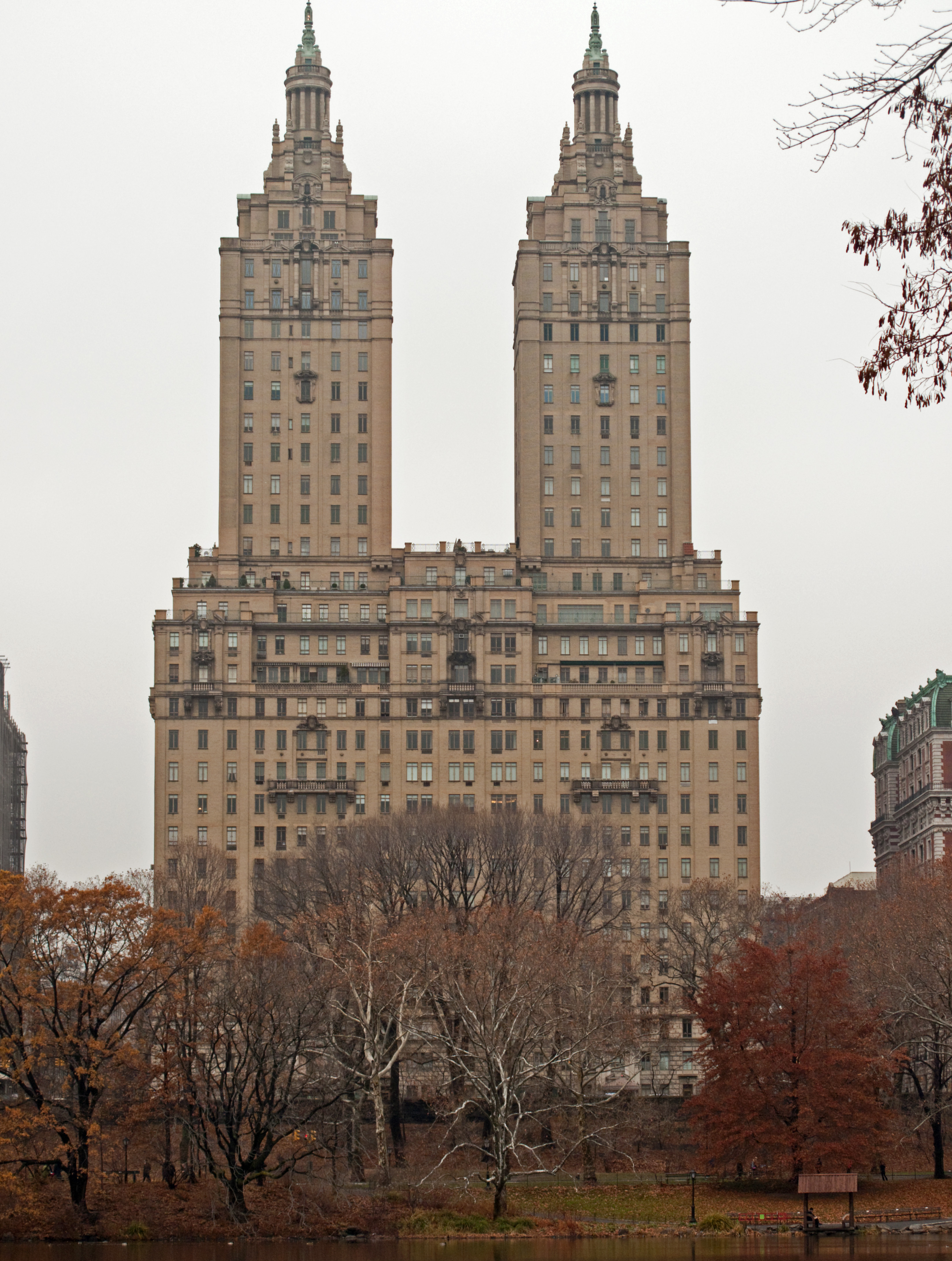
The San Remo as seen from directly across the Lake in Central Park

Because the San Remo was the earliest twin-towered apartment building on Central Park West, its completion attracted large amounts of commentary from the press. The New York Times characterized it as "an imposing addition to the tall structures overlooking Central Park". In March 1931, the New York chapter of the American Institute of Architects presented a model of the San Remo Towers, describing it as "an interesting development of the new dwellings law where large plottage permits the erection of towers". George S. Chappell, writing under the pseudonym "T-Square", praised the design of the casement windows in The New Yorker.

Several observers also commented specifically on the San Remo's towers. Chappell wrote that the towers "are fine in silhouette". In the 1970s, Paul Goldberger described the San Remo as "the best of the four twin‐towered buildings that bring such splendid life to the Central Park West skyline", at a time when Roth's firm mostly designed buildings with glass facades. Carter B. Horsley of The New York Times described the spires in 1972 as having been included "almost as an excuse to imitate the architecture of the past". Horsley subsequently listed the San Remo as having one of the ten best water-tower enclosures in New York City. The writer Elizabeth Macaulay-Lewis said in 2021: "The San Remo's Choragic towers served as outward markers of architectural elegance that could be used to lend distinction to broad, tall apartment buildings that might otherwise run the risk of being drably similar to one another."

The building's architectural style and materials were also the subject of commentary. Goldberger favorably compared the San Remo's classical design with that of the Majestic, which was designed at exactly the same time in a modern Art Deco style. John Freeman Gill of the Times wrote in 2005 that the San Remo was one of several buildings on Central Park West whose bases exhibited "the comfortable old solidity of limestone". Eric Nash, in his 2005 book Manhattan Skyscrapers, wrote that "the towers play powerfully against the background element of the sky, etching the setback image in negative space", similarly to the Petronas Towers.

In the late 20th and early 21st century, the San Remo generally had a reputation for being luxurious. In 1996, a writer for Interior Design magazine said the San Remo was "among the Upper West Side's top-drawer co-ops, the buildings that evoke the basic emotions of lust and envy when one thinks-or dreams-of the apartments within". During the 2000s, The New York Times said the presence of Central Park West's "architectural gems", such as the San Remo, contributed to increased housing prices on the eastern side of Central Park, along Fifth Avenue. The Wall Street Journal referred to the Beresford, the Dakota, and the San Remo as the "three grand dames of the West Side". Additionally, the artist Max Ferguson created an oil painting of the San Remo in 2004. Several books have used the painting on their covers, including a 2011 edition of the Jack Finney novel Time and Again.

=== Landmark designations ===
The building is a contributing property to the Central Park West Historic District, which was recognized by the U.S. National Register of Historic Places when its nomination was accepted on November 9, 1982. In 1984, the New York City Landmarks Preservation Commission (LPC) hosted hearings to determine whether the Century, Majestic, San Remo, Beresford, and El Dorado should be designated as city landmarks. Manhattan Community Board 7 supported all five designations, but the San Remo's co-op board was concerned about whether a landmark designation would hinder the replacement of windows on the building. The LPC designated the San Remo as a city landmark on March 31, 1987. The San Remo is also part of the Upper West Side Historic District, which became a New York City historic district in 1990.

== See also ==
- List of New York City Designated Landmarks in Manhattan from 59th to 110th Streets
