= Robert W. Wilson (philanthropist) =

American hedge fund manager, philanthropist and art collector (1926–2013)

- Wilson in June 2012
- Born: November 3, 1926; Detroit, Michigan, US
- Died: December 23, 2013 (aged 87); New York City
- Education: Amherst College; University of Michigan; University of Michigan Law School (dropped out)
- Occupation: Businessman

Robert Warne Wilson (November 3, 1926 – December 23, 2013) was an American hedge fund manager, philanthropist, and art collector.

== Early life and education ==
Born in Detroit, Wilson gained his undergraduate degree at Amherst College and his master's from the University of Michigan. He attended the University of Michigan law school, but later left to work as a securities analyst.

== Career and philanthropy ==
Wilson began his career in 1949, as a trainee at First Boston, then returned in 1953, following his service in the Korean War.

He founded his own hedge fund in 1969, and retired in 1986. By 2000 he was worth an estimated $800 million.

According to BusinessWeek he gave away over four hundred million dollars, and according to others more than $600 million, to environmental and preservation organizations including the Nature Conservancy and the World Monuments Fund. While Wilson mainly donated to conservation and environmental causes, he also donated to both politically conservative and liberal causes. He gave nearly $1 million to The Federation for American Immigration Reform (FAIR), yet he also donated $800,000 to the Drug Policy Alliance in 2007 and opposed the war on drugs. After his death, an email correspondence with Bill Gates revealed that Wilson opposed The Giving Pledge, calling it "practically worthless."

An avid art collector at the time, Wilson had been on the board of trustees of the Whitney Museum of American Art for over thirty years. In his will, Wilson left his art collection to The Whitney with the exception of James Rosenquist's 1997 painting, "The Meteor Hits the Swimmer's Pillow."

He was chairman of the New York City Opera board from 1981 to 1993. Wilson was passionate about criminal justice reform and was a member of the American Civil Liberties Union for over four decades.

== Personal life ==
Wilson was openly gay. He married once and was divorced; he had no children. He was survived by his brother William.

== Death ==
Wilson died on December 23, 2013, at age 87, after leaping from his apartment on the 16th floor of The San Remo in Manhattan. He had suffered a stroke in June 2013 and another in the month prior to his suicide.
