= John H. Duncan =

American architect

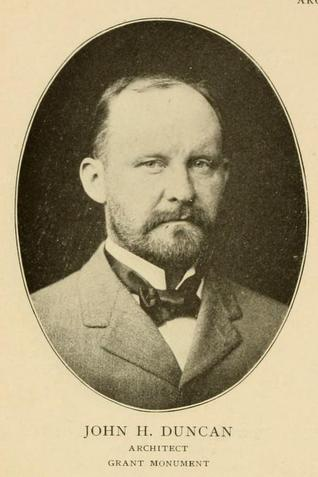
John H. Duncan

John Hemenway Duncan (January 21, 1854 – October 18, 1929) was an American architect.

== Life and career ==
Duncan was the designer of the Wolcott Hotel. One of the most famous architects in the United States at the turn of the 20th century, his popularity rose after being selected as the architect of what is now Grant's Tomb, another "reconstruction" of the Mausoleum of Halicarnassus (Greek Ionia).

Another of Duncan's most famous works is the Soldiers' and Sailors' Arch in Grand Army Plaza in Brooklyn, New York, often referred to as Brooklyn's version of the Arc de Triomphe.

Duncan also contributed townhouses on Manhattan's Upper East Side. One marvelous example is 21 East 84th Street (with its neighbors, 1132 and 1134 Madison Avenue), still intact today with much of the original interior and exterior. "A brick and terra-cotta terrace (English-style grouping of jointly designed townhouses), now sullied by unhappy storefronts on the avenue. But look up at the frieze".

In 1899, Duncan designed a five-story limestone mansion for Philip Lehman at 7 West 54th Street, which was designated as a New York City landmark in 1981. He also contributed designs for several buildings in the West 76th Street Historic District in the late 1880s and 1890s.

He also designed Walhall, a "great estate" in Greenwich, Connecticut. Although the main house no longer exists, an outbuilding intended eventually for the superintendent still exists and is a private residence today.

Duncan—who had been a resident of Binghamton, NY—also had designed the Daniel S. Dickinson monument in front of the Broome County courthouse, located on Court Street in Binghamton, NY.
