= The Kenilworth =

Apartment building in Manhattan, New York

Coordinates: 40.7785°N 73.9747°W

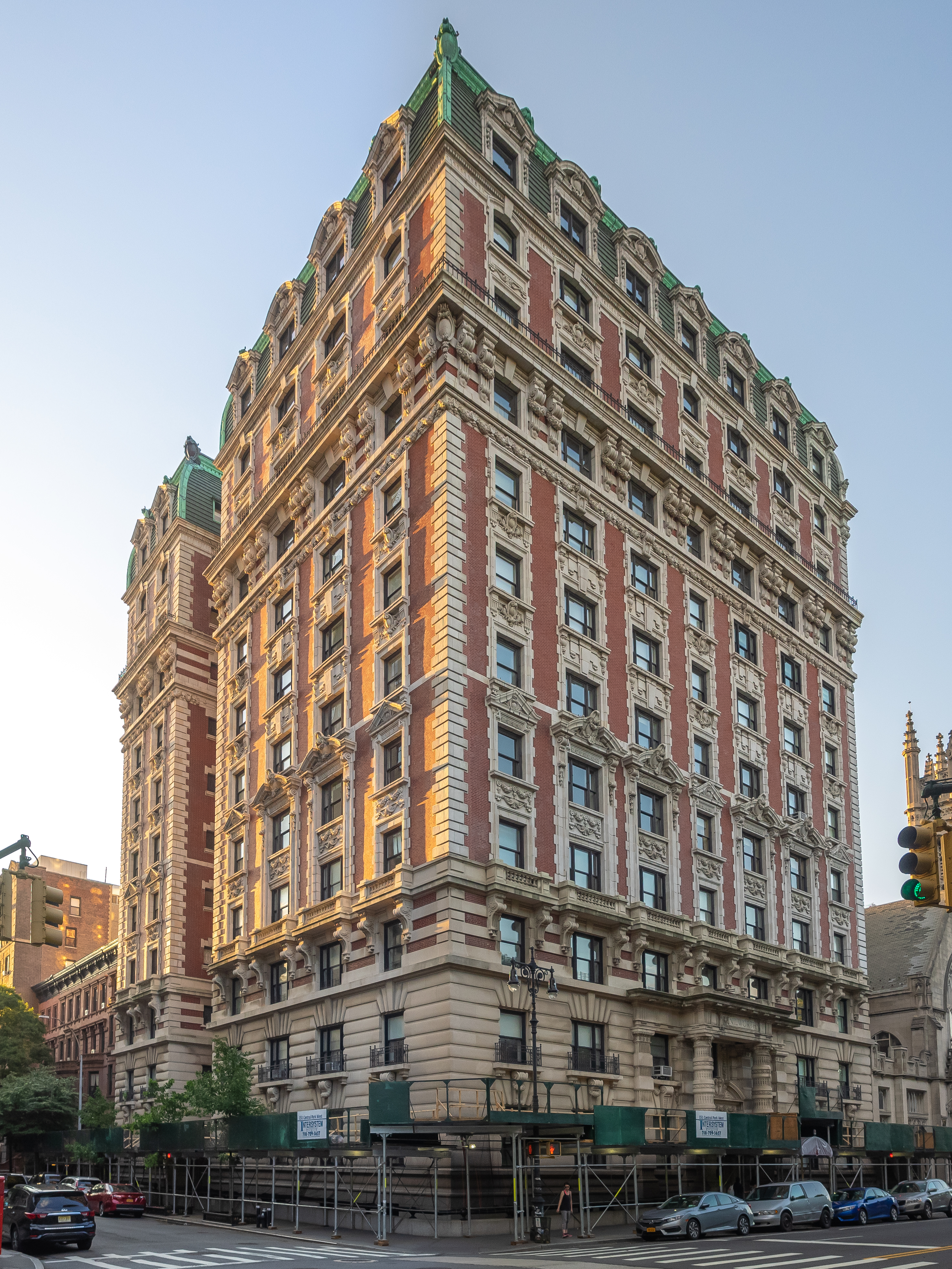
The Kenilworth

The Kenilworth is a luxury 12-floor co-operative apartment building at 151 Central Park West, at 75th Street, on the Upper West Side of Manhattan in New York City, New York, US. Named for the 12-century Kenilworth Castle, construction on the residential building was completed in 1908, and was designed in the French Second Empire-style by architects Townsend, Steinle and Haskell, with three units per floor.

The Kenilworth is located within the Upper West Side-Central Park West Historic District and the Central Park West–76th Street Historic District designated by the New York City Landmarks Preservation Commission, and is a contributing property to the federally designated Central Park West Historic District. Other Beaux-Arts apartment properties in this area of the same period include The Prasada, The Langham, and The Saint Urban.

== Architecture ==
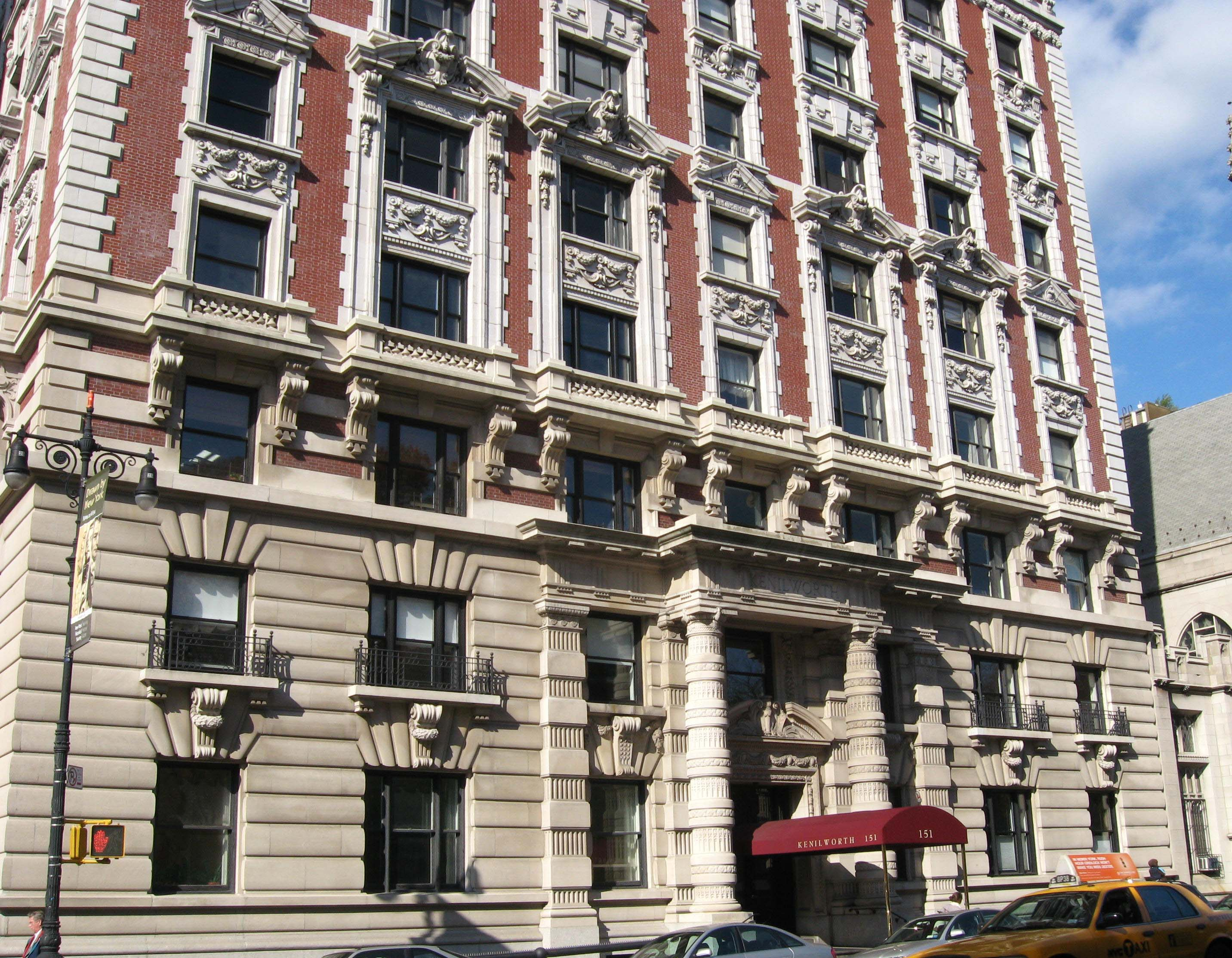
Facade close-up

The exterior facade of carved limestone and red brick walls is unchanged from the original construction with the exception of wood frame window replacement. Similar to The Prasada and The Lucerne, the entrance features banded columns. Featuring a mansard roof, the rooftop terrace is a common area to the residents.

== Notable residents ==
- Michael Douglas and Catherine Zeta Jones, who own a four-bedroom penthouse on the top floor with a nearly 40-foot (12 m) long living room. The property was listed for sale in July 2021.
- Basil Rathbone
