= Fourth Universalist Society in the City of New York =

Church in Manhattan, New York

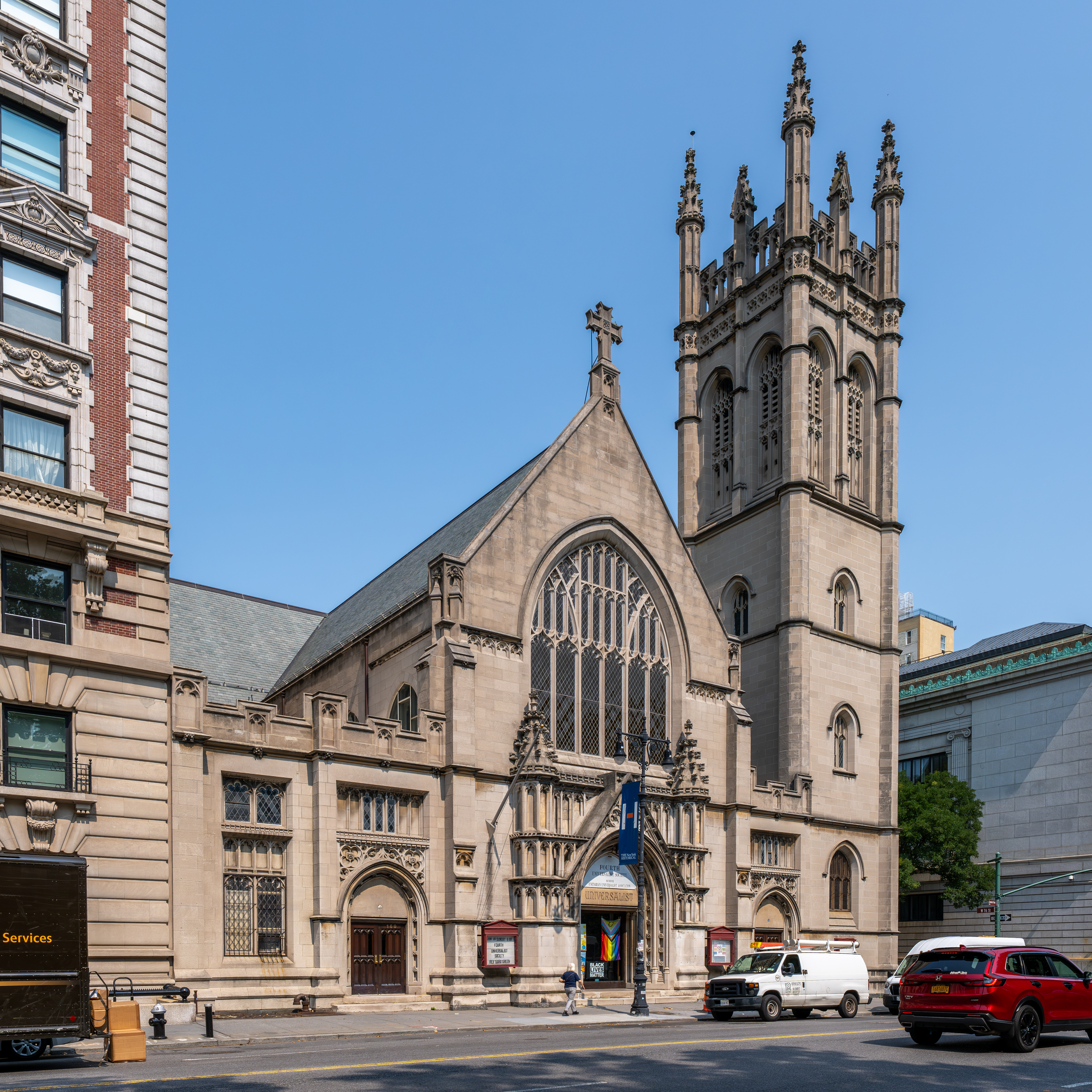
- View from Central Park West (2026)

General information
- Location: 160 Central Park West (at W. 76th St.)
- Coordinates: 40°46′43.2″N 73°58′27.7″W
- Affiliation: Unitarian Universalist Association

Website
- www.4thu.org

The Fourth Universalist Society in the City of New York is a congregation within the Unitarian Universalist Association located on the Upper West Side of Manhattan. It is the last surviving of seven Universalist congregations in the city, founded on the belief of universal salvation that emphasized the love of God for all people. Today, the congregation is pluralistic and non-creedal, welcoming a diverse range of religious beliefs and practices and finding unity in a commitment to social justice.

== History ==
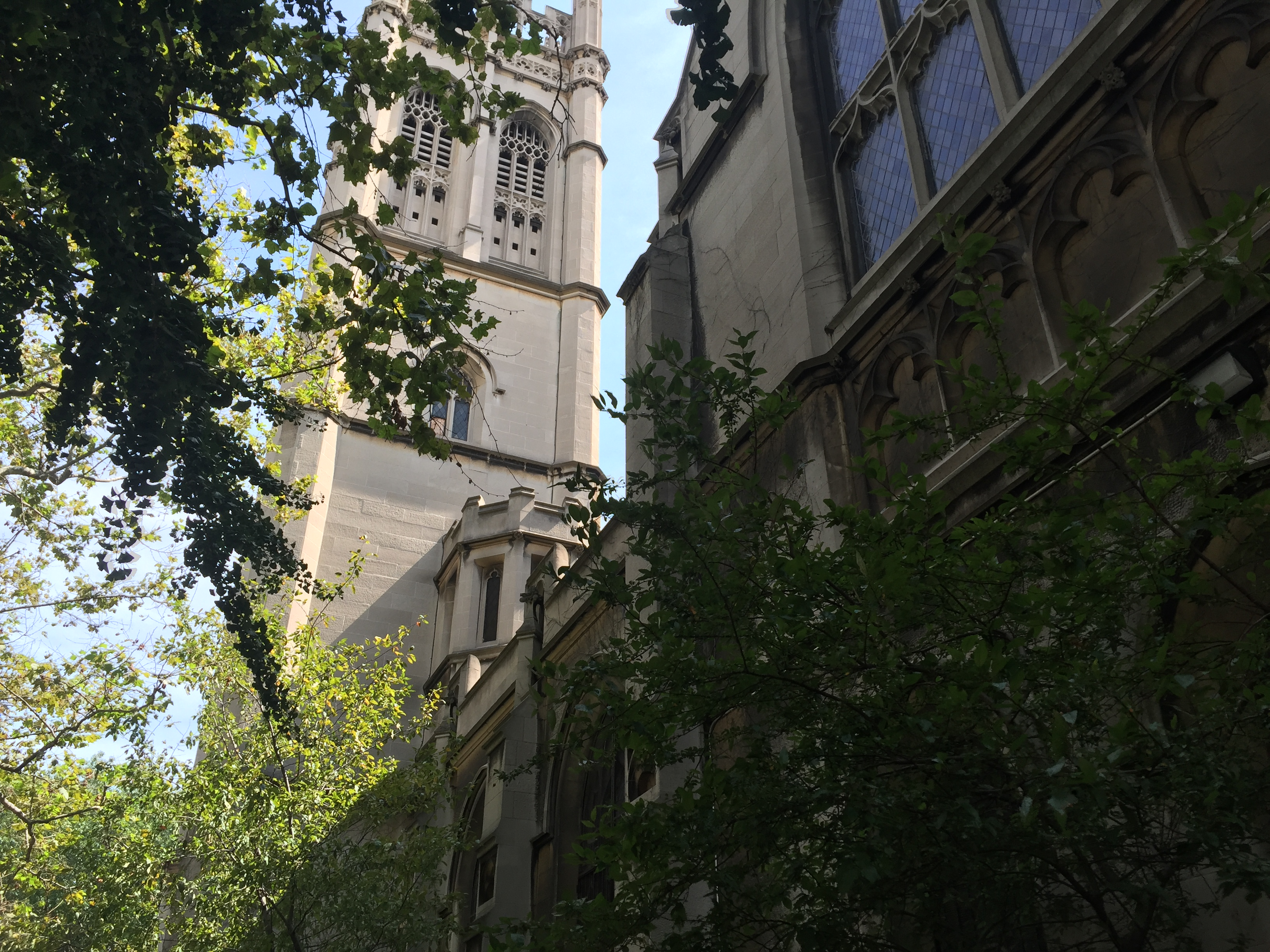
View from 76th Street

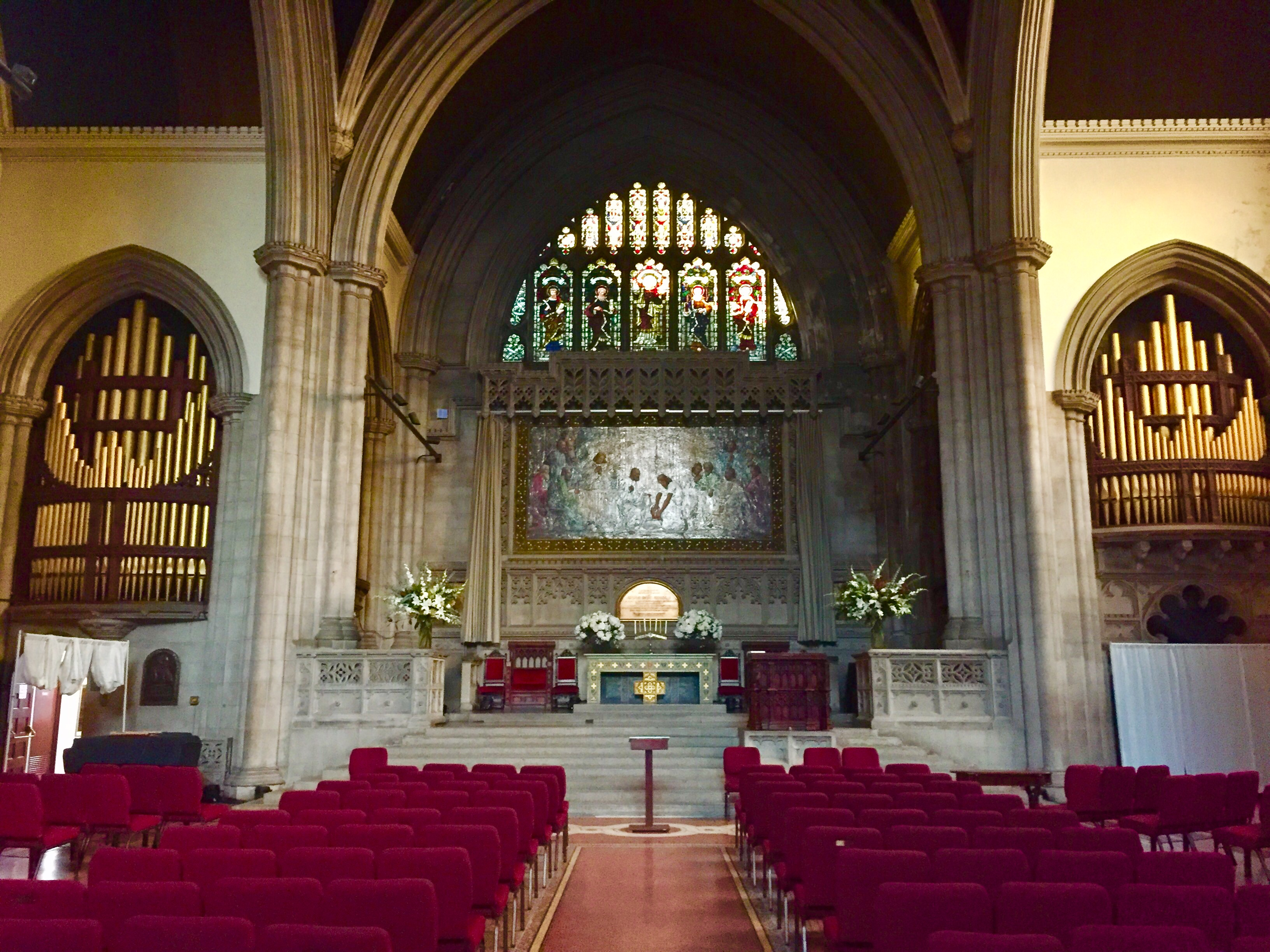
Interior of Sanctuary, Front

The congregation began in 1838 as New York City's fourth society devoted to the Universalist faith (the previous three were founded in 1796, 1830 and 1832, respectively). The congregation's original name was Friends of the Final Restitution and in 1848, it changed its name to the Church of the Divine Paternity. It officially took the name of Fourth Universalist Society in the City of New York in 1967. Over the years it has attracted notable personalities such as P. T. Barnum, Horace Greeley, Oscar Hammerstein II, Louise Whitfield Carnegie, Lou Gehrig, Barbara Gittings, and Winifred Latimer Norman to its pews.

In 1898, the congregation built its current home, dubbed "the Cathedral of Universalism", at West 76th Street and Central Park West on New York City's Upper West Side. The architect, William Appleton Potter, based the design closely upon Magdalen Tower, Oxford, and buildings at Magdalen College. In 1993 Robert A. M. Stern and his co-authors described the church as "one of the few buildings to break from Central Park West's prevailing Classicism." A rare design in English Perpendicular Gothic, it received praise from notable architects including Frank Lloyd Wright, whose daughter was married at the church. The church houses several significant artistic works, including an altar by Louis Comfort Tiffany, a bronze relief sculpture by Augustus Saint-Gaudens, a mosaic by J&R Lamb Studios, and stained glass windows by Clayton and Bell of London. The organ was donated by Andrew Carnegie and his wife, Louise Carnegie, the latter who was a member of the church. Originally designed and constructed by the Hutchings-Votey Organ Company of Boston, the organ was rebuilt and revised by the Ernest M. Skinner Company. The 76th Street building is part of the Central Park West–76th Street Historic District, designated by the New York City Landmarks Preservation Commission, and is a contributing property to the Central Park West Historic District, listed on the National Register of Historic Places.

== Community partnerships ==
In the 1980s, the congregation received inquiries from real estate developers eager to purchase the church's valuable location. Instead, the congregation joined with community activists, preservationists, and neighbors to form Save Our Universalist Landmark (SOUL) and successfully raised funds for maintenance and capital improvements. In return for these funds, the church promised not to exercise its development rights for a certain number of years, one of the first such agreements of its kind. In 2018, the congregation embarked on a second SOUL campaign, aimed at replacing a rapidly aging roof. With the help of neighbors, state grants, and congregational members, the campaign successfully raised over 1.5 million dollars.

The church tower, dedicated by the congregation to peace and named "The Peace Tower of New York City", is used by NBC each November as its "high-tech command center" for live coverage of the Macy's Thanksgiving Day Parade.

== Activism and justice ==
The congregation is known for its commitment to social justice, notably through its support of immigration justice, voter advocacy, environmentalism, the LGBT community, and the Black Lives Matter movement.

On May 1, 2016, the congregation called the Rev. Schuyler Vogel to become its next senior minister. In February 2017, the membership voted unanimously to become a sanctuary congregation to protect undocumented immigrants from deportation. Several weeks later, the building was vandalized by swastikas and hate speech, an incident that garnered national media attention.

In March 2018, the congregation accepted Aura Hernandez into sanctuary, an undocumented mother who had fled an abusive relationship and gang violence in Guatemala. Her case received coverage by The New York Times, Democracy Now!, and The Nation magazine.

In 2019, Fourth Universalist became the home of Sanctuary Neighborhoods, a grassroots organizing network serving immigrant families in New York City.

== List of clergy ==
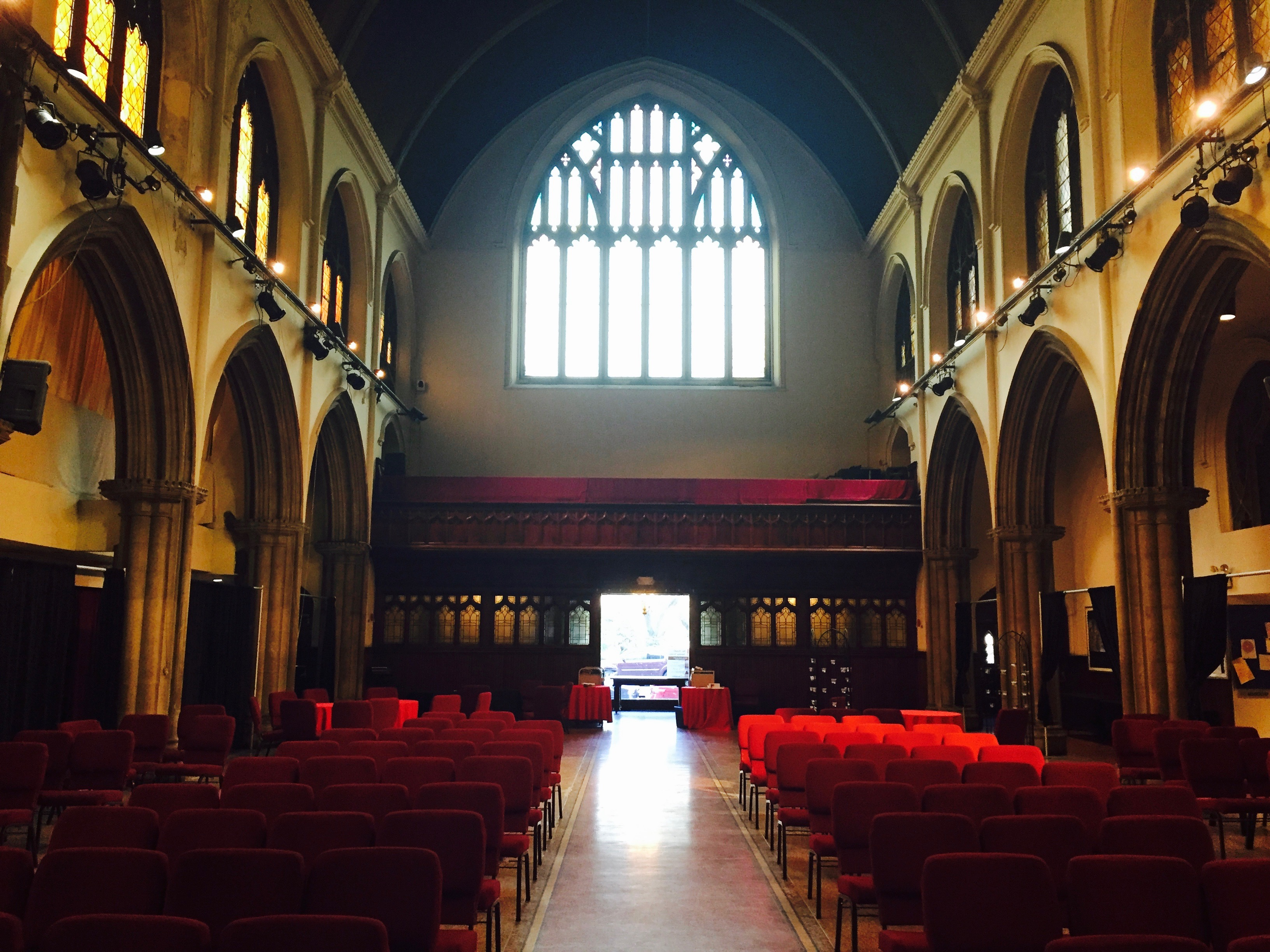
Interior of Sanctuary, Back

- 1838–1840: William Whittaker
- 1840–1843: Isaac D. Williamson
- 1843–1845: Moses Ballou
- 1846–1847: Thomas Lake Harris
- 1848–1880: Edwin Hubbell Chapin
- 1881–1902: Charles Henry Eaton
- 1902–1919: Frank Oliver Hall
- 1919–1925: Joseph Fort Newton
- 1927–1929: Charles Francis Potter
- 1929–1938: Frank Oliver Hall
- 1938–1941: S.E. Gerard Priestley
- 1941–1943: Eleanor G. Collie
- 1943–1954: Benjamin B. Hersie
- 1955–1956: Albert F. Ciarcia
- 1957–1958: Raymond J. Baughan
- 1959–1967: Leonard Helie
- 1968–1973: Richard A. Kellaway
- 1973–1974: Arlin Roy
- 1974–1984: Joel Schoelfield
- 1984–1985: Charles A. Howe
- 1985–1987: Joyce H. Smith
- 1987–1989: Robert A. Kaufmann
- 1989–1999: Darrell Berger
- 1999–2001: Richard Nugent
- 2001–2014: Rosemary Bray McNatt
- 2014–2016: Susan Milnor
- 2016–2023: Schuyler Vogel
- 2023–2024: Jonipher Kwong
- 2024–2026: Sam Trumbore
- 2026–Present: Sara Green
