= West 76th Street Historic District =

Historic district in Manhattan, New York

- U.S. National Register of Historic Places
- U.S. Historic district
- New York State Register of Historic Places
- New York City Landmark
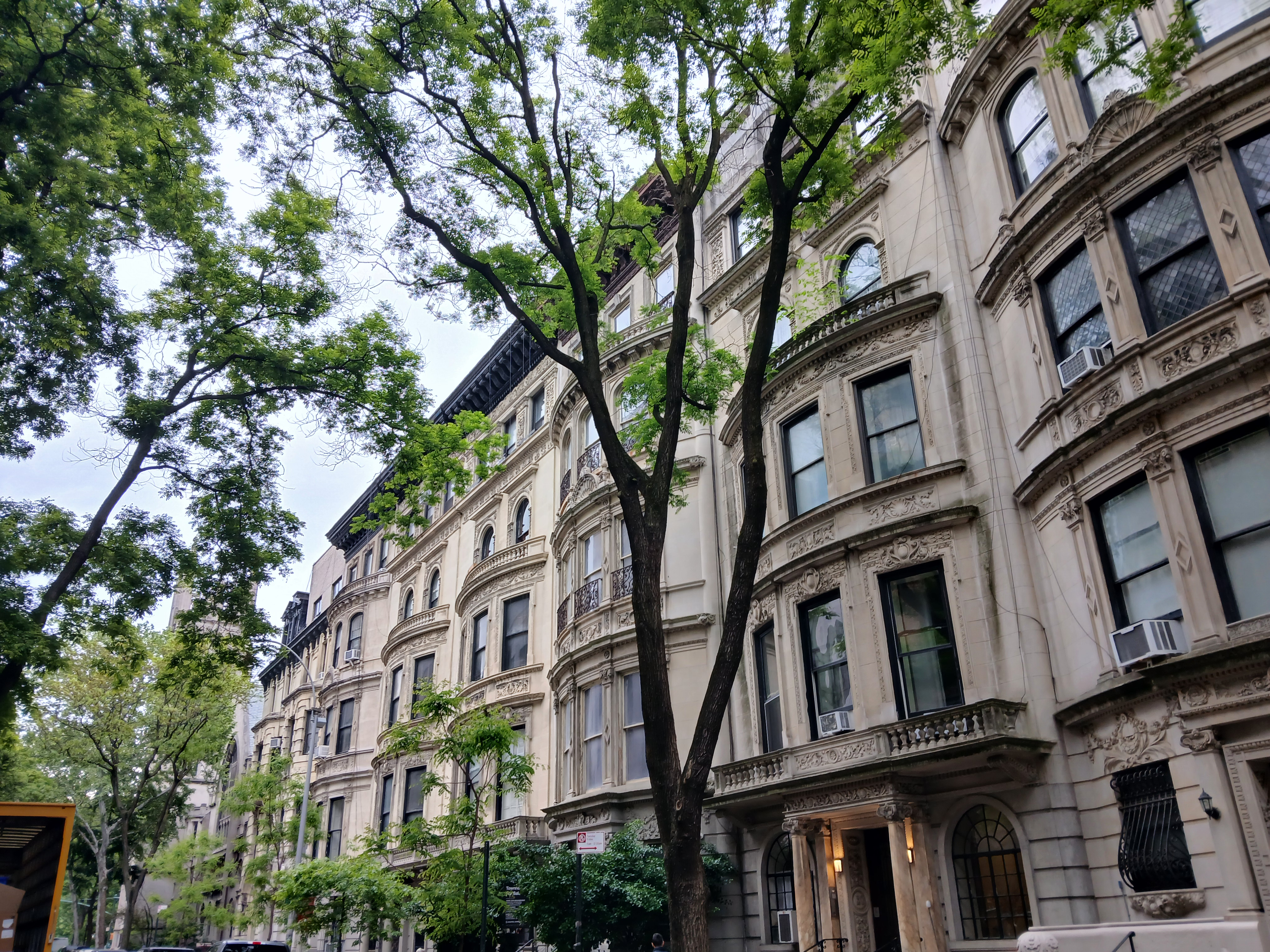

- Location within Manhattan Location within New York City Location within New York Location within the United States
- Location: West 76th Street between Columbus Avenue and Central Park West, New York, New York
- Coordinates: 40°46′45″N 73°58′34″W
- Area: 1.5 acres (0.61 ha)
- Built: 1887
- Architect: Multiple
- Architectural style: Beaux Arts, Renaissance, Romanesque
- NRHP reference No.: 80002728
- NYCL No.: 0713

Significant dates
- Added to NRHP: July 24, 1980
- Designated NYSRHP: June 23, 1980
- Designated NYCL: April 19, 1973

The West 76th Street Historic District is a historic district on the Upper West Side of Manhattan in New York City, New York, US. It includes a series of rowhouses on 76th Street between Central Park West and Columbus Avenue, which were listed on the National Register of Historic Places (NRHP) in 1980. The NRHP district overlaps with the Central Park West–76th Street Historic District, designated by the New York City Landmarks Preservation Commission (LPC) in 1973.

The houses date from between 1887 and 1900. The buildings were designed in a variety of revivalist architectural styles, including the Romanesque, Renaissance, and Gothic revival styles. All of the houses are subject to various covenants, which restricted their height. The LPC district includes four additional buildings (44 West 77th Street, The Kenilworth, Church of the Divine Paternity, and New York Historical) which are not in the NRHP district, but are covered by other NRHP designations.

== Description ==
The West 76th Street Historic District consists of two overlapping designations on the Upper West Side of Manhattan in New York City, New York, US. The National Register of Historic Places (NRHP) designation encompasses 44 rowhouses on 76th Street between Central Park West and Columbus Avenue. It consists entirely of the properties at 15–51 West 76th Street to the north and 8–56 West 76th Street to the south. The rowhouses are designed in revivalist architectural styles, including the Romanesque, Renaissance, and Gothic revival styles, and are subject to height restrictions due to an 1890 covenant.

The New York City Landmarks Preservation Commission (LPC) designation includes all the NRHP-designated rowhouses, along with additional buildings on the eastern and northern boundaries, giving the city district a "T" shape. The additional buildings (the New-York Historical Society, the Church of the Divine Paternity, and the Kenilworth) are situated on Central Park West, and are part of another NRHP district, the Central Park West Historic District. The northern edge of the city district also protrudes to encompass 44 West 77th Street; this building is its own distinct NRHP listing. The entire district is also part of a second city district, the Upper West Side/Central Park West Historic District. The historian Paul Goldberger wrote in 1976 that the block was "one of the city's finest".

Developers and architects
Address / Name	Location	Completed	Developer	Architect
8–10 West 76th Street	South side of 76th Street	1900	Cornelius Luyster	John H. Duncan
12–24 West 76th Street	South side of 76th Street	1899–1900	James Carlew	Cleverdon & Putzel
15–25 West 76th Street	North side of 76th Street	1893–1895	Cornelius Luyster	John H. Duncan
26 West 76th Street	South side of 76th Street	1898	Herman Goldman	Schickel & Ditmars
27–37 West 76th Street	North side of 76th Street	1889	Leonard Beeckman; Bernard S. Levy	George M. Walgrove
28–38 West 76th Street	South side of 76th Street	1891	William C, G. Wilson; James Tichborne	G. A. Schillinger
39–51 West 76th Street	North side of 76th Street	1893	Alfred G. Nason	G. A. Schillinger
40–56 West 76th Street	South side of 76th Street	1889	Leonard Beeckman; John C. Umberfield	George M. Walgrove
44 West 77th Street / Studio Building	South side of 77th Street	1909	Walter Russell	Harde & Short
Church of the Divine Paternity	Southwest corner of 76th Street and Central Park West	1898	Church of the Divine Paternity congregation	William Appleton Potter
The Kenilworth	Northwest corner of 76th Street and Central Park West	1908	Lenox Realty Company	Townsend, Steinle, & Haskell
New York Historical	West side of Central Park West	1908, 1938	New York Historical	York & Sawyer; Walker & Gillette

=== South side of 76th Street ===
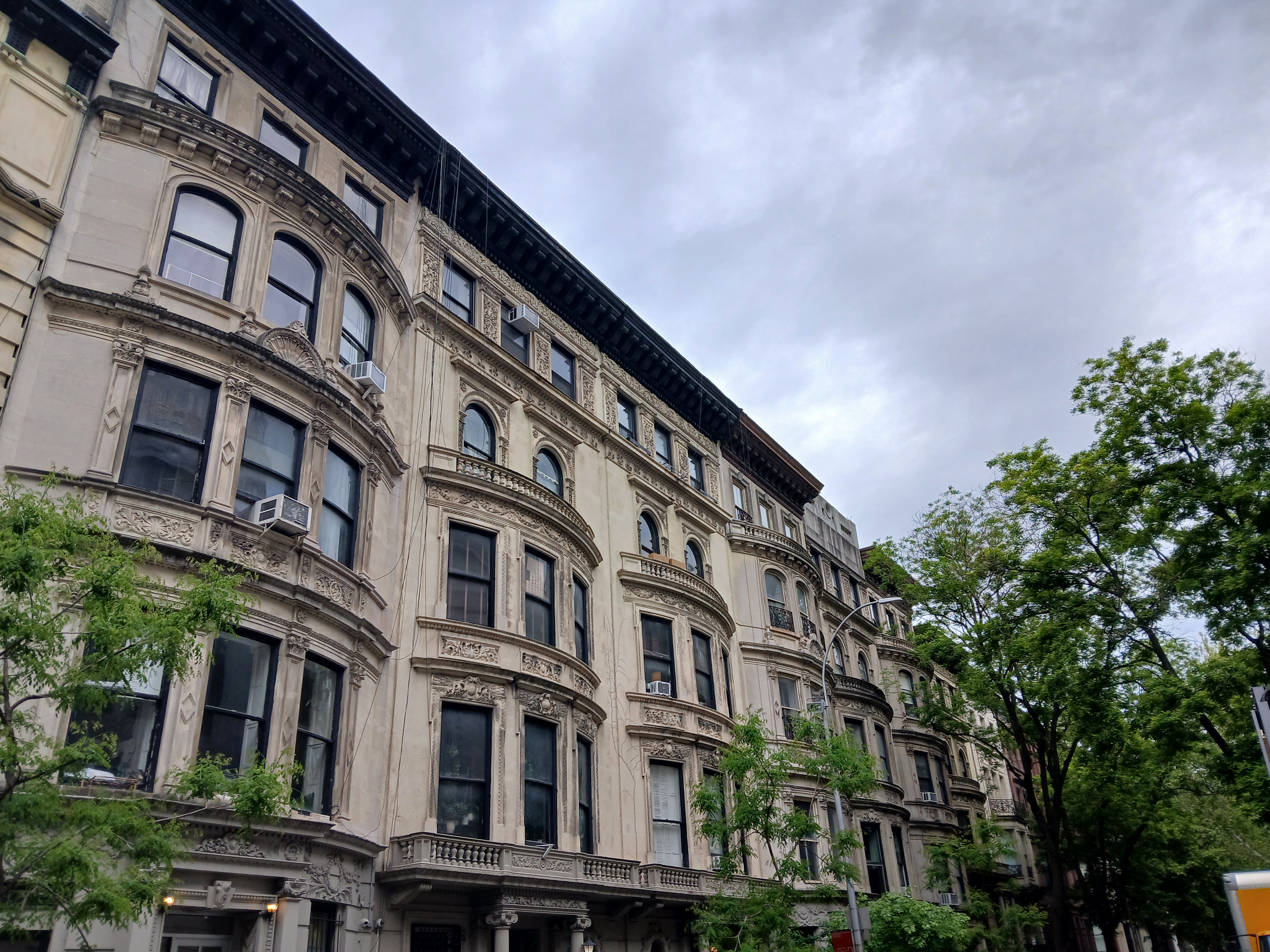
Houses at 12–24 West 76th Street, on the south side of the street

The houses on 76th Street are within both the city and NRHP designations. On the south side of the street, the district encompasses 25 houses. John H. Duncan designed the easternmost two houses on the south side of the street, at 8 and 10 West 76th Street. These houses are designed in the Beaux-Arts style and are each five stories tall. Numbers 8 and 10 have limestone facades with decorations such as protruding bays, rectangular panels, and wrought-iron doors and railings; both originally had mansard roofs, which remain only on number 8.

There are seven houses at 12–24 West 76th Street, designed by Cleverdon & Putzel. The stone-clad houses at number 12–16 are each five stories tall, and have rusticated ground stories shielded by porticos; the upper stories include concave curved bays, foliated spandrel panels, and sheet metal cornices. The houses at 18–24 West 76th Street are designed in a similar style to numbers 12–16. These houses are each five stories high, except number 24, which is four stories and has a higher basement to match the neighboring 26 West 76th Street. 26 West 76th Street, a four-story property designed by Schickel & Ditmars, was designed in isolation, unlike all the other houses on the street's southern sidewalk. This house has a rusticated ground story, an eared neo-Renaissance-style frame, and ironwork at the top.

G. A. Schillinger designed six brownstone houses at 28–38 West 76th Street, each four stories high. The houses mix elements of several architectural styles—including Neo-Grec-style pilasters, Renaissance-style window frames, and Romanesque-style round-arched windows—along with decorations such as pediments, stoops, and band courses. The westernmost nine houses on the south sidewalk, at 40–56 West 76th Street, were designed by George M. Walgrove, with varying design elements and a shared cornice. The buildings at number 40–56 contain a variety of bays, oriels, arches, and window frames, and some of them retain their original stoops. Number 56 has a bay that protrudes to the lot line, flush with the neighboring building to the west.

=== North side of 76th Street ===
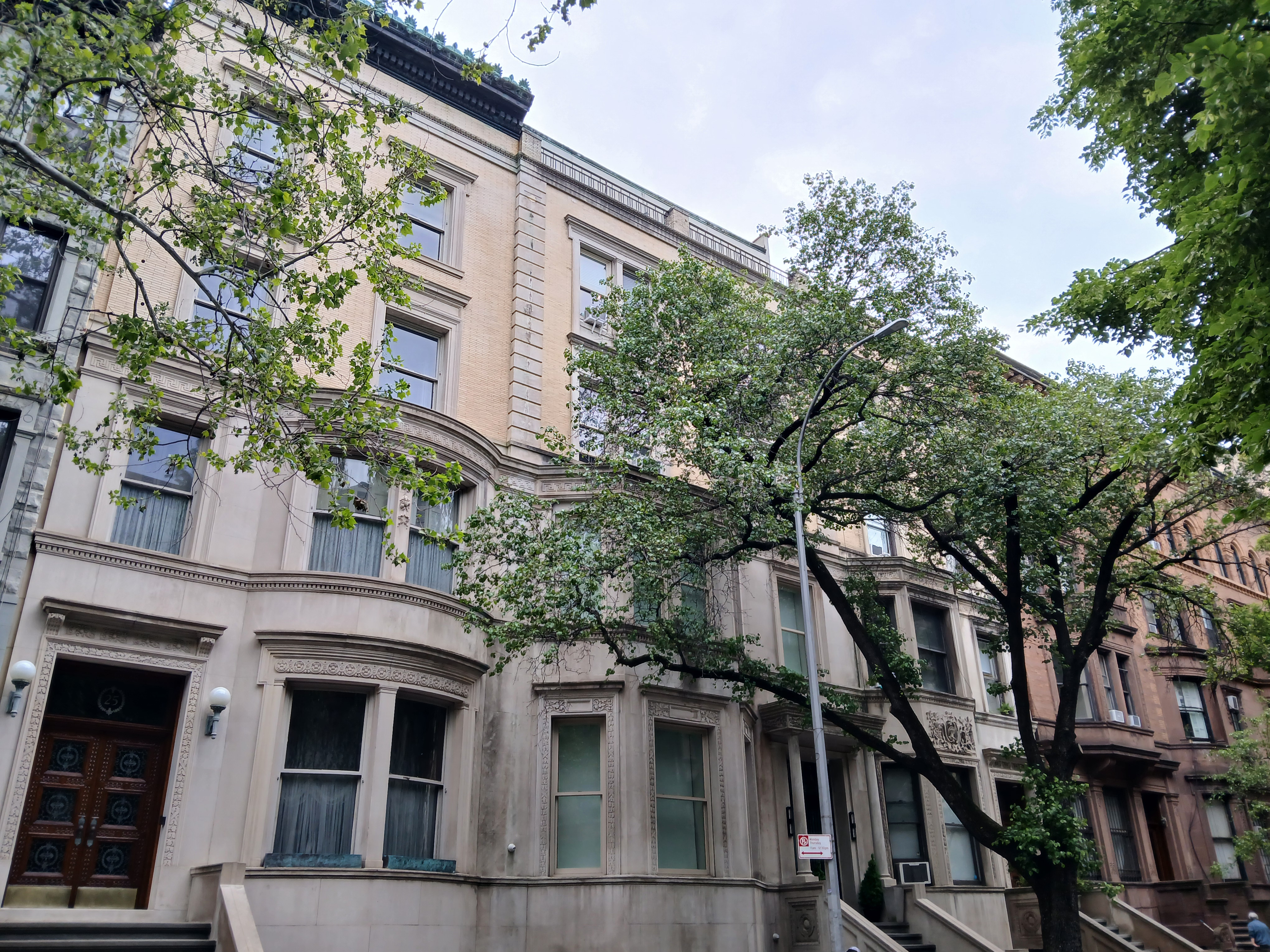
Houses at 15–25 West 76th Street, on the north side of the street

The district encompasses 19 houses on the north side of the street. On the north side of 76th Street, Duncan designed another set of six houses at 15–25 West 76th Street, all of which are four stories with a raised basement. The houses at numbers 15–19 have brick and ashlar facing, with decorations such as cornices, stoops, and Ionic pilasters. Number 15 has an oriel bay, number 17 has a simpler curved bay, and number 19 has a window flanked by pilasters. The houses at numbers 21–25 have ashlar on the lower floors (painted in a limestone hue) and brick above, and they retain details such as stoops, elaborately molded doorways, and quoins separating each house.

West of Duncan's homes are six houses at 27–37 West 76th Street, which were designed by Walgrove. Each of these houses has rough-surfaced facades and square-headed windows in alternating styles, along with neo-Grec-style decorations. The buildings have alternating Queen Anne-style roofs and protruding cornices, and individual houses have other details not present in the others, such as a stoop outside number 31. The westernmost seven houses on the north sidewalk, at 39–51 West 76th Street, were all designed by Schillinger with neo-Grec and Romanesque decorations. Each of these houses are four stories high with rough-surfaced basements, brownstone above the basement; the lower floors feature curved or oriel bays, while there are square-headed windows at their upper floors. Some of the houses contain details not present in the others, including arched openings, stoops, and pediments.

=== Central Park West and 77th Street ===
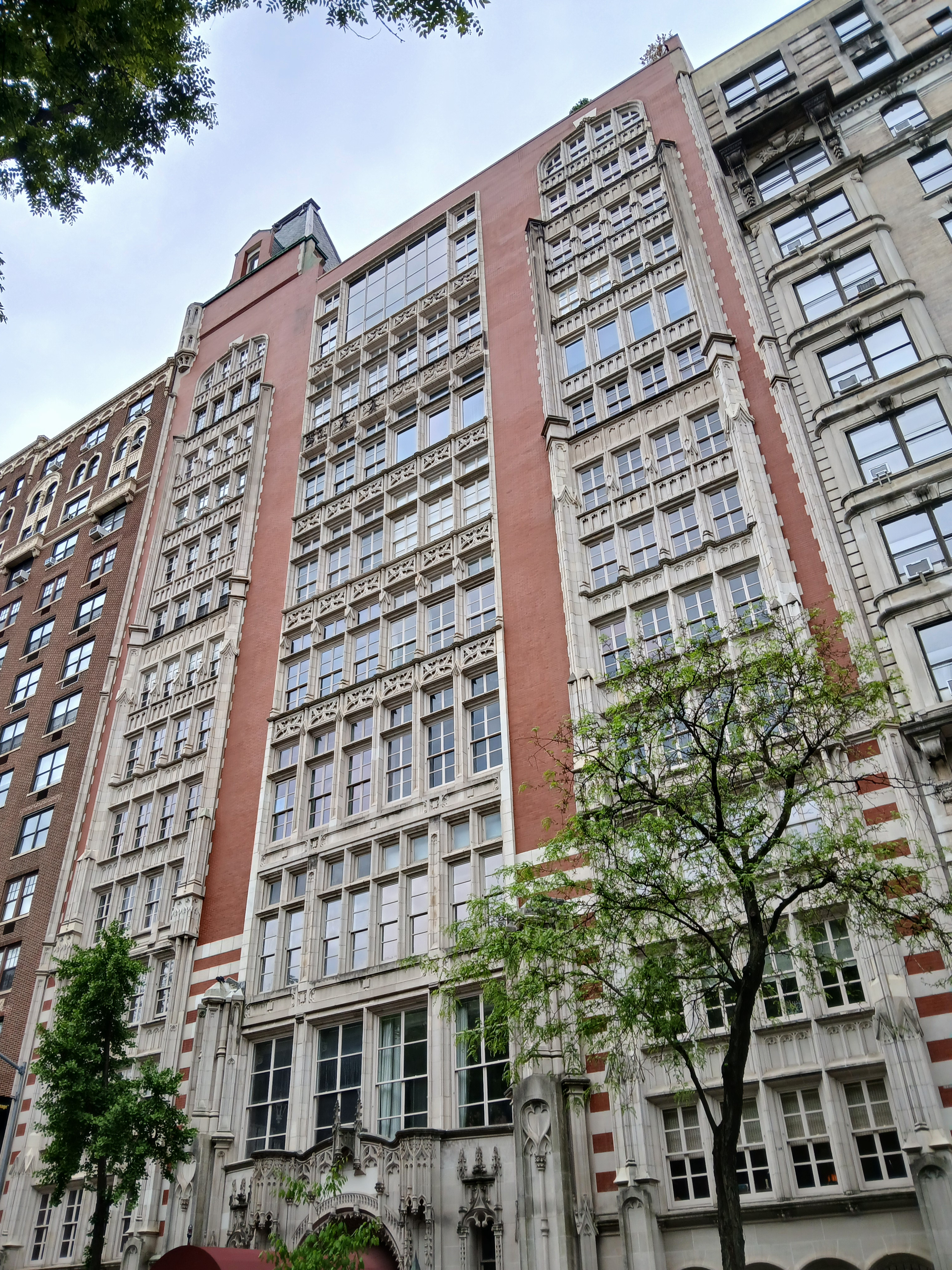
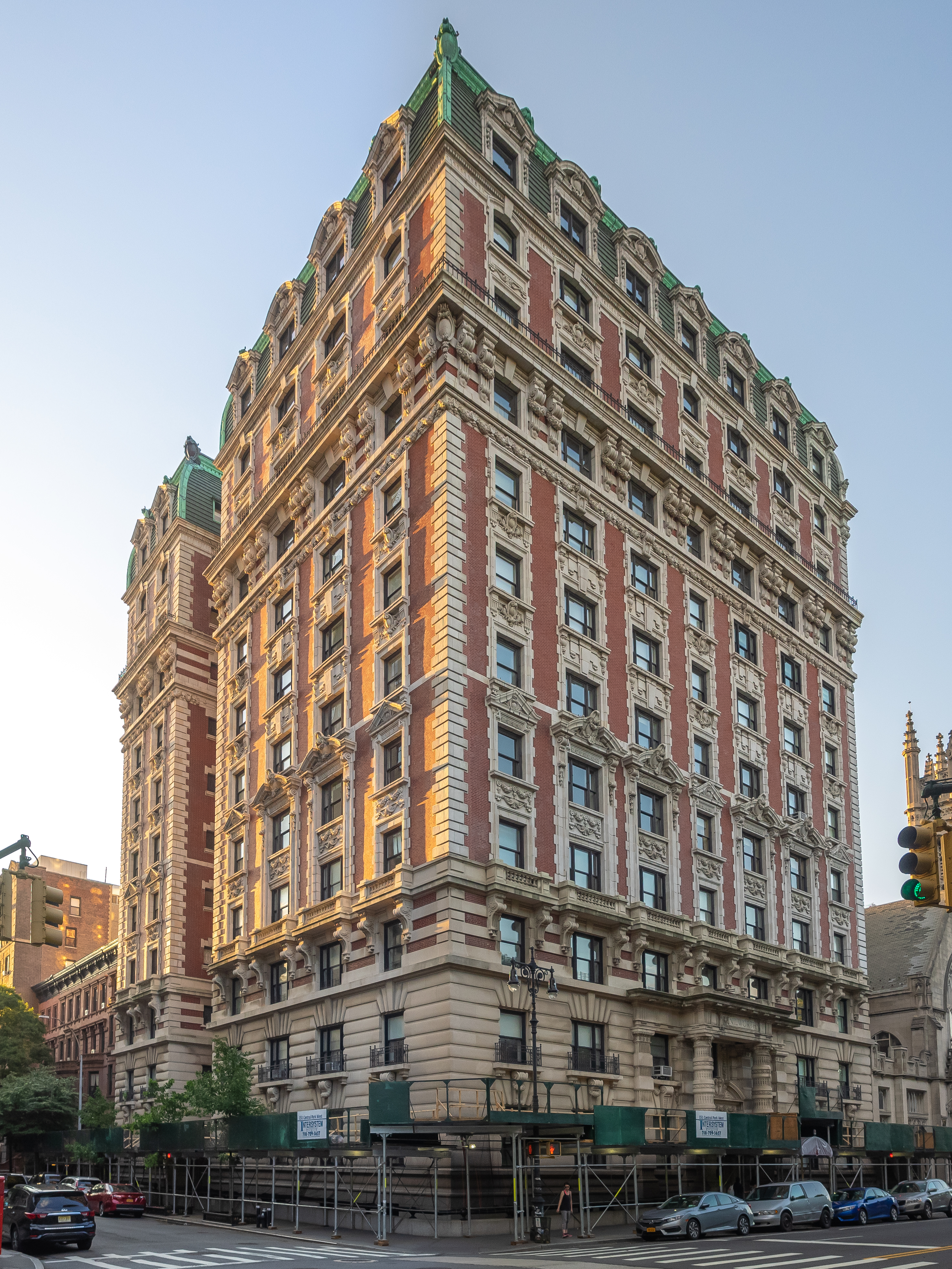
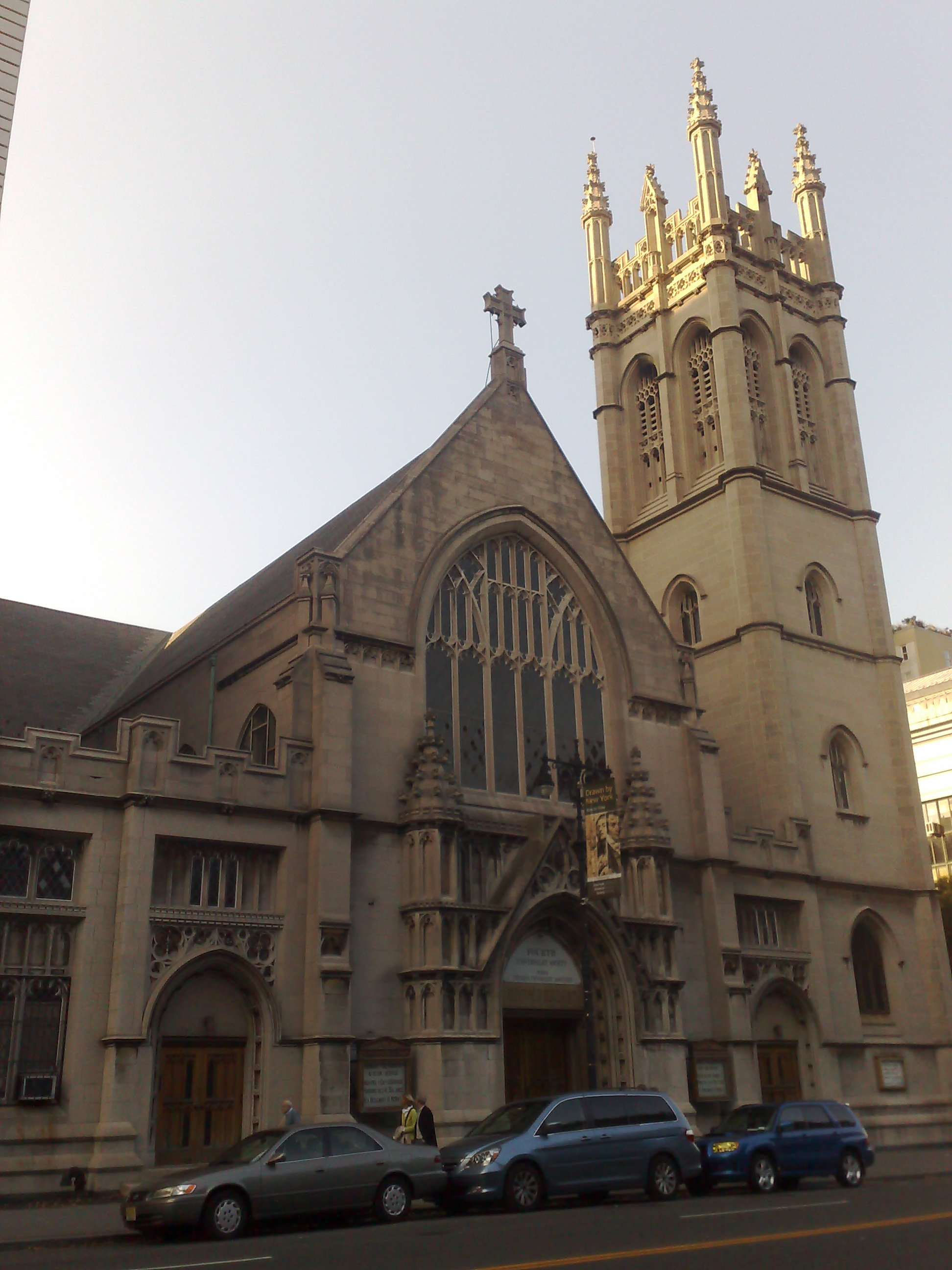
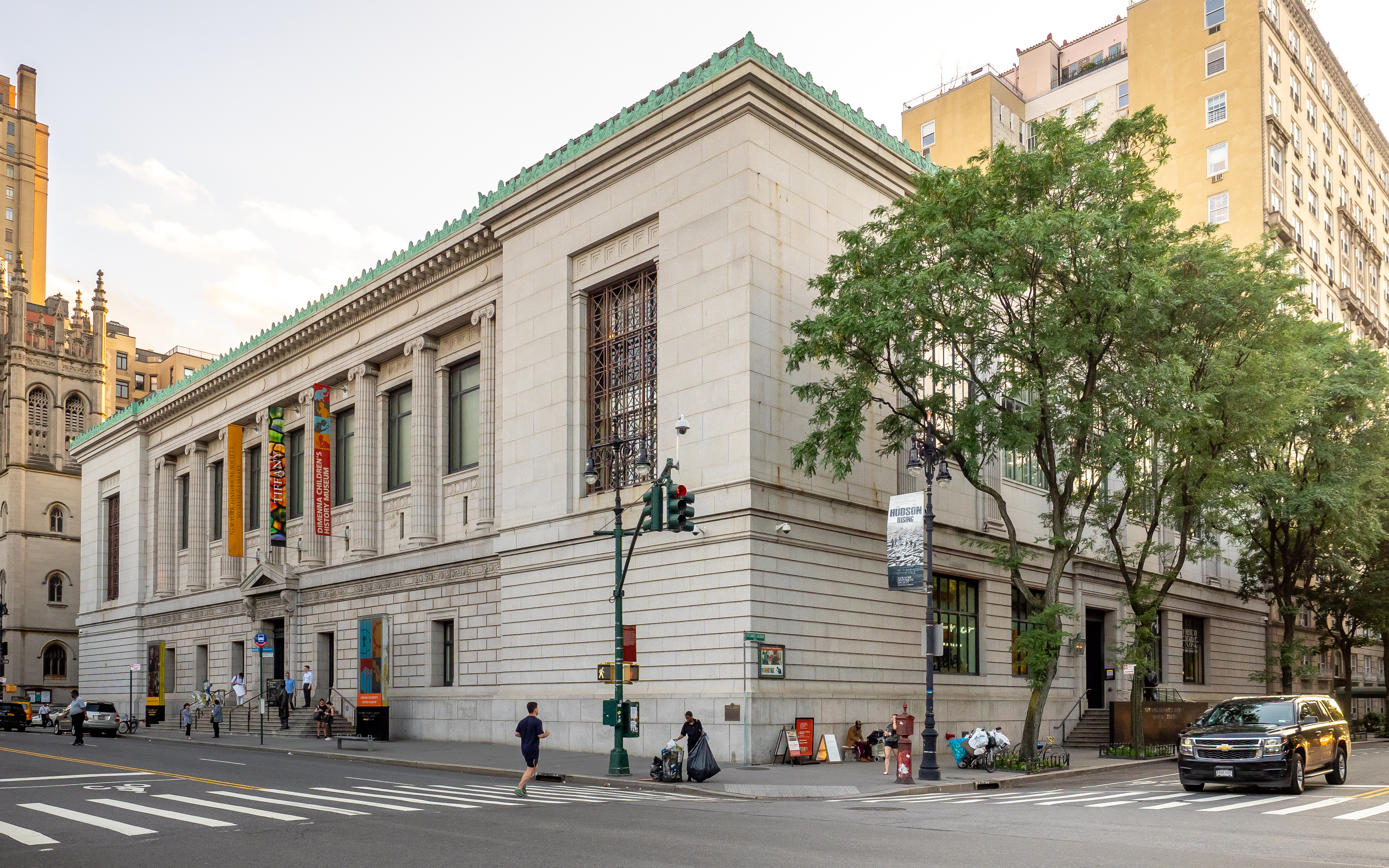
44 West 77th Street, the Kenilworth, the Church of the Divine Paternity, and the New York Historical building (left to right) are part of the LPC district. Though not in the NRHP district, they are part of other NRHP listings.

The properties with frontages on Central Park West and 77th Street are only within the LPC district. The Central Park properties are within the NRHP-listed Central Park West Historic District, while 44 West 77th Street is its own listing. 44 West 77th Street was designed by Harde & Short for Walter Russell. Its exterior is inspired by French churches and Belgian government buildings, with a brick facade, limestone trim, and three protruding bays of windows. The original decorations include extensive tracery, arches, finials, trefoil or quatrefoil motifs, and crockets. The interior retains its original entrance vestibule and many of its apartment layouts, which include studios with 1 1/2-story ceilings.

The southernmost of the Central Park West properties is the Kenilworth at 75th Street, which has a facade of carved limestone and red brick walls, along with a mansard roof. It was designed by Townsend, Steinle, & Haskell. and is variously cited as being in the Second Empire or Beaux Arts styles. The Kenilworth has rusticated limestone decorations at its first two stories, above which is a brick facade with limestone trim. The entrance has columns and pilasters with bands.

The Church of the Divine Paternity is located just north of the Kenilworth, at the southwest corner of Central Park West and 76th Street. It carries the addresses 4 West 76th Street and 160 Central Park West. The church, a Gothic Revival building designed by William Appleton Potter, includes a four-section tower rising above it. The facade has a stained glass window similar to one in the Gloucester Cathedral, along with tracery, band courses, buttresses, and finials. The tower has drip moldings, pinnacles, and pointed arches. There is also a parish house just west of the church itself.

The New York Historical Society, occupying the entire western frontage of Central Park West between 76th and 77th streets, is designed in the neoclassical or Eclectic Roman style. The original section of the building was designed by York & Sawyer and completed in 1908. A pair of wings flanking it were completed by Walker & Gillette in 1938 in a very similar style to the original structure. The facade is made of Maine granite; the same material was used on an early-2020s annex. The first story is rusticated, while the upper stories have a colonnade of engaged columns that flank recessed windows.

== History ==
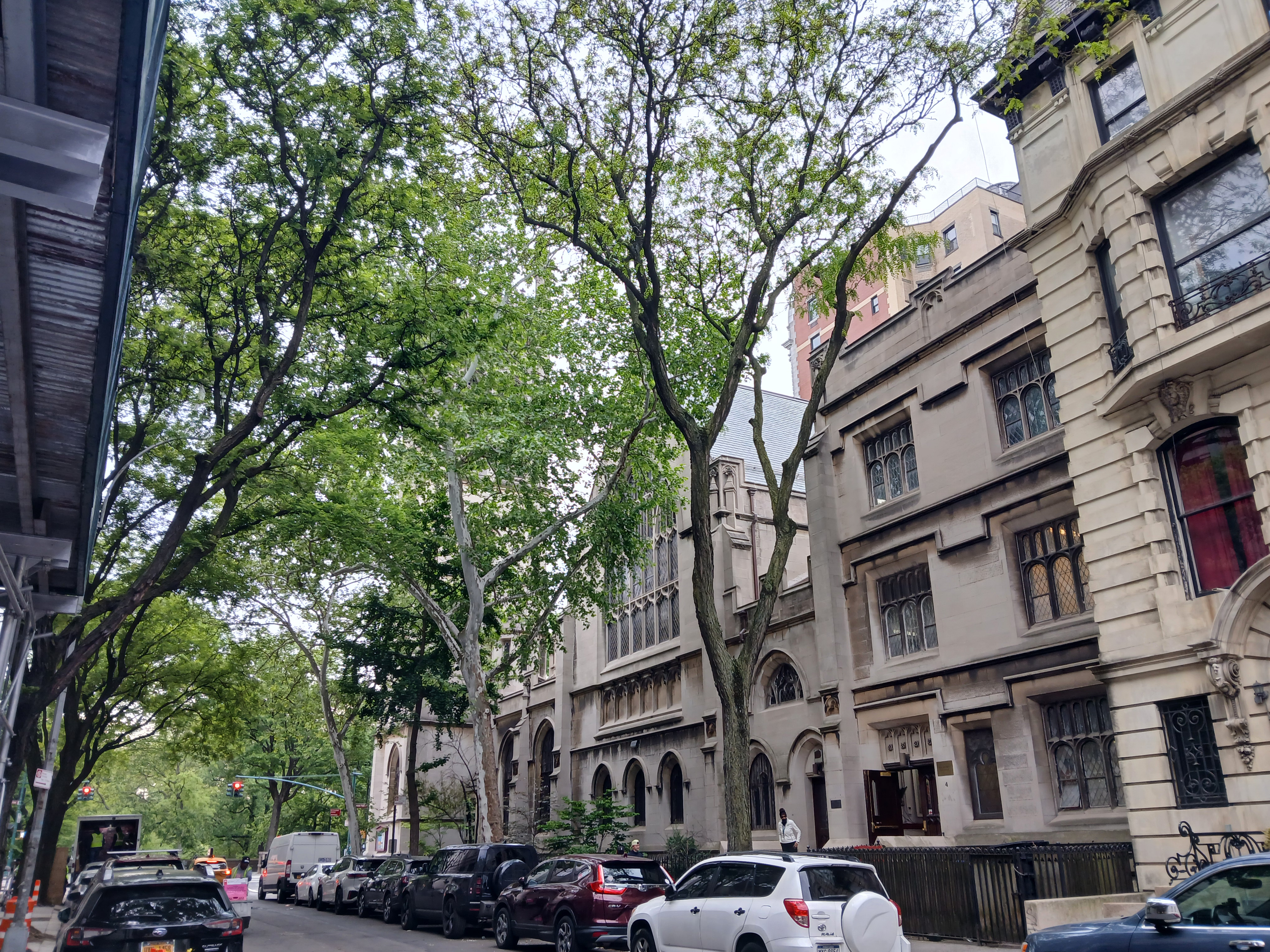
Houses and the Church of the Divine Paternity on the south side of the street, facing east

Before European colonization of modern-day New York City, the site was inhabited by the Lenape people. After the British established the Province of New York, the area became part of the "Thousand Acre Tract", owned by several English and Dutch settlers, in 1667. The tract was later subdivided; by 1745, the area had become part of the farm of Teunis Somarindyck (also spelled Somerindyke), running between 73rd and 77th streets. The land was further subdivided and resold in the 19th century. The construction of Central Park in the 1860s spurred construction on the Upper East Side of Manhattan, but similar development on the Upper West Side was slower to come. This was in part because of the West Side's steep topography and its dearth of attractions compared with the East Side. Except for Central Park West (which opened as Eighth Avenue in 1816), streets in the area were not laid out and opened until after the 1850s. The block of 76th Street between Central Park West and Columbus Avenue opened in 1861, while 77th Street to the north and 75th Street to the south opened in 1865 and 1869, respectively.

Major developments on the West Side were erected after the Ninth Avenue elevated line opened in 1879, providing direct access to Lower Manhattan, and after the American Museum of Natural History and the Dakota apartment building were constructed nearby in the 1870s and 1880s. The first phase of housing development in the West 76th Street Historic District began in 1887, when Leonard Beeckman helped finance two rows of houses on opposite sides of the street. That July, George S. Walgrove filed architectural plans for nine houses at numbers 40–56 West 76th Street and six houses at numbers 27–37. The property owners agreed to a restrictive covenant in 1890, which dictated the massing and design of future buildings on these lots.

G. A. Schillinger designed the houses at numbers 28–36 for William C. G. Wilson and James Tichborne, which were built in 1891. The same year, Schillinger began designing numbers 39–51 for Alfred G. Nason, which were completed in 1893. John H. Duncan began developing the sites at numbers 17–21 for local developer Cornelius W. Luyster in 1892. Finished the next year, these were the first of several collaborations Duncan and Luyster had in the district; they then developed numbers 21–25 between 1894 and 1895. Schickel & Ditmars designed a single house at 26 West 76th Street, built between 1896 and 1898 for the real-estate agent Herman Goldman. Development of the houses was completed by around 1898, and the Church of the Divine Paternity was being completed that year. Cleverdon & Putzel designed seven houses for James Carlew at numbers 12–24 in the following two years. Plans for four of these houses (18–24) were filed in April 1898, followed by plans for the other three (12–16) in February 1899. Duncan also designed two other houses at 8–10 West 76th Street for Luyster in 1899, which were completed the next year. The Kenilworth was completed in 1908, and the first part of the New York Historical Society building was completed that December. 44 West 77th Street was finished the next year, in 1909.

The New York Historical Society hired Walker & Gillette to design expansions to its building in 1937, which were finished the following year. The New York City Landmarks Preservation Commission (LPC) first proposed designating the land lots between 2 and 24 West 76th Street as a historic district in December 1966. The LPC designated most of the houses on either side of 76th Street, along with the adjacent properties on Central Park West and 77th Street, as part of the Central Park West-76th Street Historic District in 1973. The district was added to the National Register of Historic Places in 1980. The entire district was also nominated as part of the LPC's Upper West Side–Central Park West Historic District in the late 1980s; this larger district was designated in 1990. In 2023, the New York Historical began constructing another wing on 76th Street, which was completed in 2026 and is faced in the same material as the original building.

== See also ==
- List of New York City Designated Landmarks in Manhattan from 59th to 110th Streets
- National Register of Historic Places listings in Manhattan from 59th to 110th Streets
- West 73rd–74th Street Historic District, two blocks south, also overlaid by the Upper West Side/Central Park West Historic District
- West 67th Street Artists' Colony, to the south, also overlaid by the Upper West Side/Central Park West Historic District

== Sources ==
- Alpern, Andrew (January 1, 1992). Luxury Apartment Houses of Manhattan: An Illustrated History. Courier Corporation. ISBN 978-0-486-27370-9.
- Central Park West - 76th Street Historic District (PDF) (Report). New York City Landmarks Preservation Commission. April 19, 1973.
- Diamonstein-Spielvogel, Barbaralee (2011). The Landmarks of New York (5th ed.). Albany, New York: State University of New York Press. ISBN 978-1-4384-3769-9.
- National Register of Historic Places Inventory/Nomination: West 76th Street Historic District (PDF) (Report). National Park Service. 1980.
