= The Brentmore =

Apartment building in Manhattan, New York

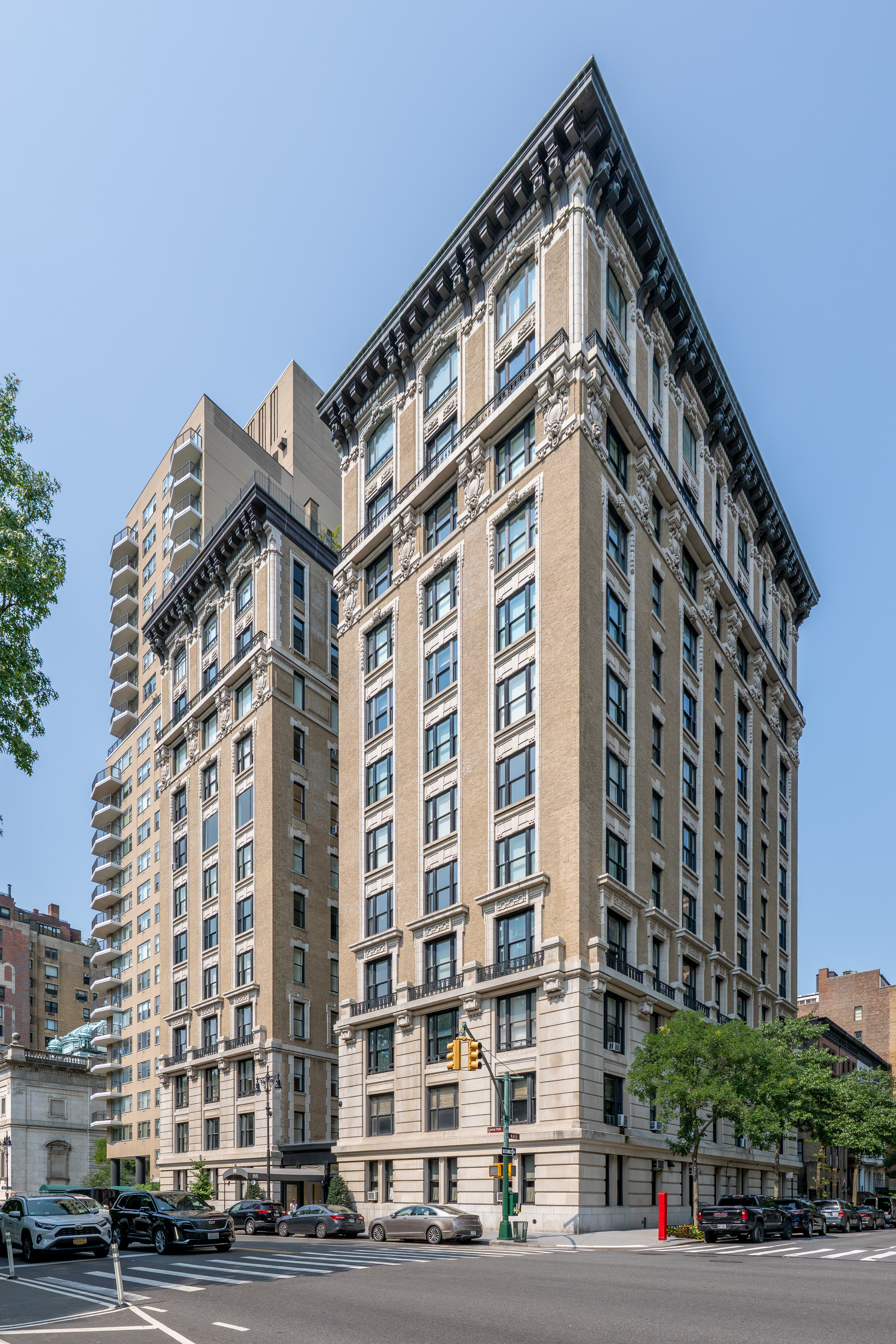
- The Brentmore in 2026
- Interactive map of the The Brentmore area

General information
- Type: Residential
- Location: 88 Central Park West
- Coordinates: 40.7742°N 73.97782°W

Height
- Height: 146 ft

Technical details
- Floor count: 12

The Brentmore is an apartment building at 88 Central Park West, along the southwest corner with 69th Street, on the Upper West Side of Manhattan in New York City, United States. The Brentmore is in the city-designated Upper West Side-Central Park West Historic District, and it is a contributing property to the federally designated Central Park West Historic District. The beige brick Brentmore was built in 1910.

== Notable residents ==
Notable residents of the Brentmore have included:

- Joan Copeland, actress
- Clive Davis, producer
- Elliott Erwitt, photographer with an apartment and main floor studio
- Celeste Holm, actress
- Sean Lennon
- Lorne Michaels, producer
- Robert De Niro, actor
- Paul Simon, musician
- Sting, musician
- Harvey Weinstein, producer
- Annie Leibovitz, photographer
