= Central Park West Historic District =

Historic district in Manhattan, New York

- U.S. National Register of Historic Places
- U.S. Historic district
- New York State Register of Historic Places
- New York City Landmark
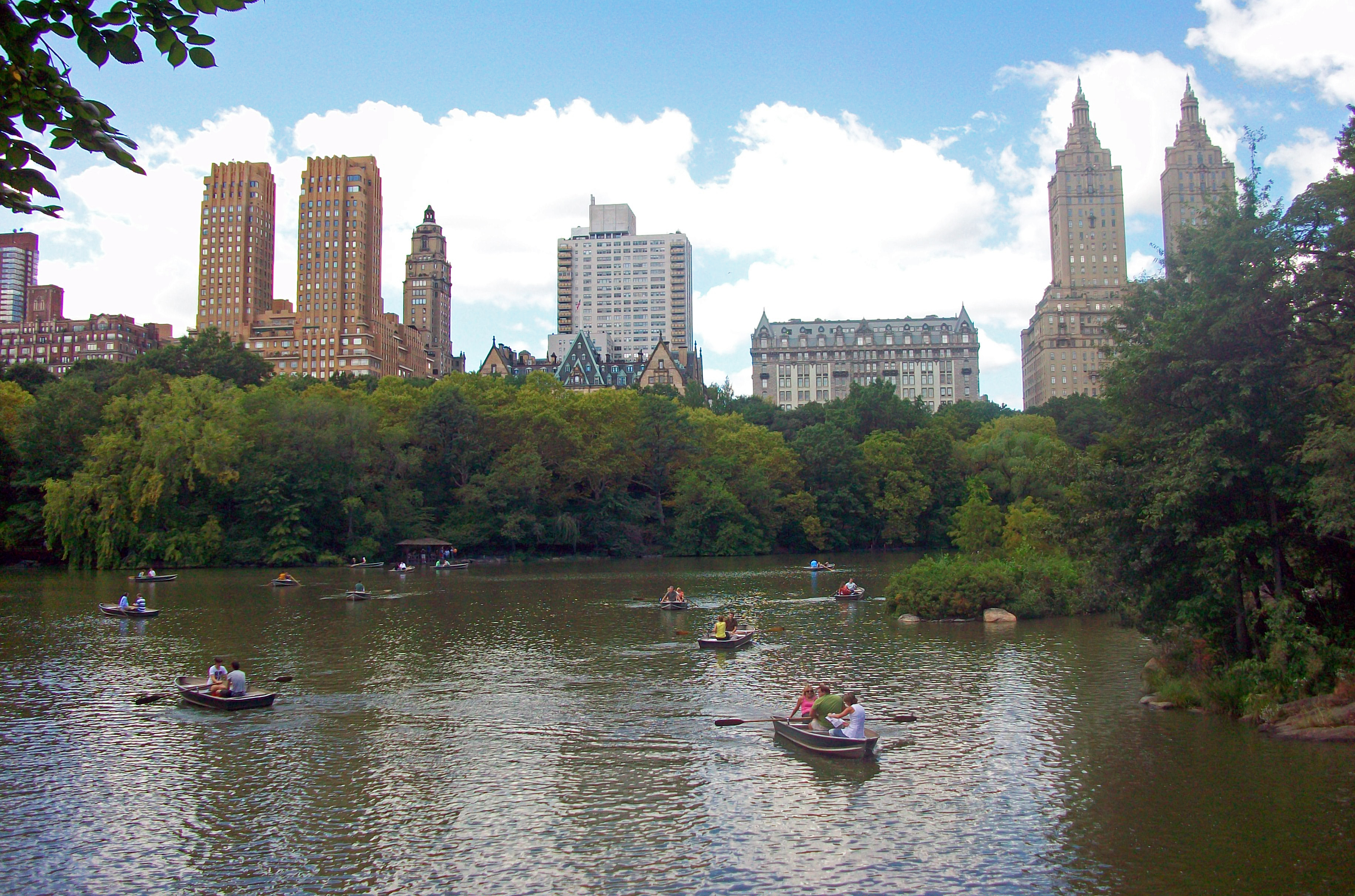
- The Majestic, Dakota, Langham and San Remo from Bow Bridge in Central Park, 2009

- Location within Manhattan Location within New York City Location within New York Location within the United States
- Location: Central Park West between 61st and 97th Sts., New York City
- Coordinates: 40°47′4″N 73°58′10″W
- Area: 40 acres (16 ha)
- Built: Various
- Architect: Various
- NRHP reference No.: 82001189
- NYCL No.: 1647

Significant dates
- Added to NRHP: November 9, 1982
- Designated NYSRHP: September 9, 1982
- Designated NYCL: April 24, 1990

The Central Park West Historic District is located along Central Park West, between 61st and 97th Streets, on the Upper West Side of Manhattan in New York City, New York, US. The district was added to the National Register of Historic Places on November 9, 1982. The district encompasses a portion of the Upper West Side-Central Park West Historic District as designated by the New York City Landmarks Preservation Commission, and contains a number of prominent New York City designated landmarks, including the Dakota, a National Historic Landmark. The buildings date from the late 19th century to the early 1940s and exhibit a variety of architectural styles. The majority of the district's buildings are of neo-Italian Renaissance style, but Art Deco is a popular theme as well.

== History ==
The buildings that are part of the historic district were mostly developed in the 1880s through 1930s, following the construction of Central Park. This was further spurred by the construction of the Ninth Avenue Elevated, which provided easy access to Lower Manhattan. Tenements and row houses lined Amsterdam and Columbus Avenues (formerly Tenth and Ninth Avenues, respectively), while more upscale luxury buildings were built on Central Park West (formerly Eighth Avenue). Generally, the further away a lot was from Columbus Avenue and its elevated railway, the more upscale the house was likely to become. By the early 20th century, the row houses were destroyed to make way for apartment buildings. The construction of the New York City Subway's Eighth Avenue Line in the 1920s accelerated this process of redevelopment.

The Central Park West Historic District was federally recognized on November 9, 1982, when it was added to the National Register of Historic Places. It had been designated by the New York City Landmarks Preservation Commission (LPC) in 1973. The LPC had previously designated a T-shaped area, which included one block of West 76th Street, two adjacent blocks of Central Park West and a short stretch of West 77th Street, as the Central Park West–76th Street Historic District. The local designation and boundaries are separate from the 1982 National Register listing.

In 1990 the LPC designated another district, which covers almost all of the area included in the boundaries of the federal historic district. The much larger Upper West Side-Central Park West Historic District includes the area from 96th Street to 62nd Street and Central Park West to Amsterdam Avenue.

== Boundaries ==
The Central Park West Historic District is a linear historic district including the stretch of Central Park West from 61st to 97th Streets. When the Upper West Side–Central Park West Historic District was designated in 1990 as a local historic district its boundaries closely mirrored those of the 1982 Central Park West Historic District, except the local historic district encompasses land stretching to Amsterdam Avenue. The federal historic district is considerably smaller than the local district.

== Architecture ==
The expanse of Central Park West between 61st and 97th Streets is a mixture of late 19th- and early 20th-century architectural styles. By far the district's most dominant style is Neo-Renaissance, mostly neo-Italian Renaissance though there are German and Flemish Renaissance influences found in some of the structures. Art Deco, Second Empire, Beaux-Arts and Neoclassical architecture are all found in multiple buildings. Gothic and Romanesque Revival influences can be found combined with other styles in some of the buildings as well as on their own. A few Queen Anne, Art Moderne and Italianate buildings dot the streetscape of Central Park West.

Of the buildings within the boundaries of the historic district only one was considered a non-contributing property to the historic character of the district when it was nominated to the National Register: the building located at 80 Central Park West, a 1965 modern building. The area within the district is home to nearly 40 high-quality, luxury apartment highrises. Sprinkled within the residential buildings are four Christian churches, one synagogue, several smaller-scale, multi-family houses, the New York Society for Ethical Culture, the New York Historical Society and the American Museum of Natural History. (Note: The list contains information on each structure including, its common name. If the building doesn't have a general common name that can be attributed to a reliable source then the address is substituted. The address is listed for each structure because it provides a general reference point to navigate the structures of the historic district. The list's default sort orders the properties as they are on the street, from low numbered blocks (e.g. 15 Central Park West) to high numbered blocks (e.g. 336 Central Park West). Properties with addresses on streets other than Central Park West also follow this order and are in place on the list as they would appear if the historic district were walked through. Linked information on each building's major architectural themes is also listed. Following the date of construction the architect or architects names are listed. Any pertinent remarks are listed in the last column.)

=== Contributing properties ===
These properties are contributing properties that add to the character of the Central Park West Historic District.

Building name	Address	Architecture	Built	Architect(s)	Remarks
Mayflower Hotel	15 Central Park West	Neo-Renaissance	1926	Emery Roth	Demolished in 2004 to make way for what is now 15 Central Park West.
The Century	25 Central Park West	Art Deco	1931	Irwin S. Chanin	At 30 floors, one of three buildings tied for the title of the district's tallest. It was constructed at a cost of $6.5 million and designed by the firm owned by Irwin S. Chanin. The Century apartment building is located on the former site of the Century Theatre, which was demolished in 1930 and 1931 to make way for the apartments. The building is one of three within the boundaries of the historic district that stretch upwards 30 floors, thus tying it for the title of the district's tallest building. Also an individual LPC landmark.: The building that houses the Congregation Shearith Israel,
Ethical Culture School	33 Central Park West	Classical Revival	1902	John Mervin Carrère and Thomas Hastings	
Ethical Culture Meeting House	2 West 64th Street	Art Nouveau	1910	Robert D. Kohn	Also an individual LPC landmark.
Harperly Hall	41 Central Park West	Neo-Renaissance	1910	Henry W. Wilkinson	
The Prasada	50 Central Park West	Second Empire	1907	Charles W. Romeyn and Henry R. Wynne	
Holy Trinity Lutheran Church	1 West 65th Street	Gothic Revival	1903		
Ghostbusters Building	55 Central Park West	Art Deco	1929	Simon Schwartz & Arthur Gross	Informally known as "Ghostbusters Building" since 1984 film was filmed there. In the film, the building (referred to as "Spook Central") was said to have been designed by mad architect Ivo Shandor, in reality, the Art Deco building was constructed in 1929 and designed by Schwartz & Gross. The 19-floor building was portrayed as taller in the film.
65 Central Park West	65 Central Park West	Neo-Renaissance	1926	Emery Roth	
70 Central Park West	70 Central Park West	Neo-Renaissance	1916	Charles A. Rich & Frederick Mathesius	
75 Central Park West	75 Central Park West	Neo-Renaissance	1928	Rosario Candela	
Second Church of Christ, Scientist	10 West 68th Street	Classical Revival	1898	Frederick R. Comstock	The building itself is seen in the Mafia II game.
The Brentmore	88 Central Park West	Beaux-Arts	1909	Simon Schwartz & Arthur Gross	
91 Central Park West	91 Central Park West	Neo-Renaissance	1928	Simon Schwartz & Arthur Gross	
Congregation Shearith Israel Parsonage	99 Central Park West	Classical Revival	1897	Arnold William Brunner and Thomas Tryon	
Congregation Shearith Israel	8 West 70th Street	Classical Revival	1897	Arnold William Brunner and Thomas Tryon	Also known as the Spanish and Portuguese Synagogue. It is the oldest American Jewish congregation is the fifth in a line of structures dating back to 1730, though only the current building was located near Central Park West. Also an individual LPC landmark.
101 Central Park West	101 Central Park West	Neo-Renaissance	1929	Simon Schwartz & Arthur Gross	
The Majestic	115 Central Park West	Art Deco	1930	Irwin S. Chanin	At 30 floors, one of three buildings tied for the title of the district's tallest. Also an individual LPC landmark.
The Dakota	1 West 72nd Street	German Renaissance	1884	Henry J. Hardenbergh	Some sources indicate this was the first luxury apartment building in New York City. National Historic Landmark. Also an individual LPC landmark.
The Langham	135 Central Park West	Second Empire	1905	Charles W. Clinton & William Hamilton Russell	Also part of the LPC's overlapping West 73rd–74th Street Historic District.
The San Remo	145-146 Central Park West	Classical Revival	1930	Emery Roth	Prominent, two-towered, 27-story building. Also an individual LPC landmark.
The Kenilworth	151 Central Park West	Second Empire	1908	Townsend, Steinle and Haskell	Also part of the LPC's overlapping West 76th Street Historic District.
Fourth Universalist Society of New York	4 West 76th Street	Gothic Revival	1898	William A. Potter	Originally known as the Church of Divine Paternity. Also part of the LPC's overlapping West 76th Street Historic District.
New-York Historical Society	170 Central Park West	Classical Revival	1908 and 1938	Edward York & Philip Sawyer, and Walker & Gillette	Also part of the LPC's overlapping West 76th Street Historic District and an individual LPC landmark in itself.
American Museum of Natural History	79th Street at Central Park West	Gothic Revival and Romanesque Revival	1877 and 1900	Calvert Vaux & J. Wrey Mould and J.C. Cady and Co.	The building was constructed from 1874 to 1877 and designed by Calvert Vaux and Jacob Wrey Mould.
The Beresford	211 Central Park West	Classical Revival	1929	Emery Roth	Also an individual LPC landmark.
The Alden	225 Central Park West	Neo-Renaissance	1926	Emery Roth	
227 Central Park West	227 Central Park West	Queen Anne	1888	Thomas & Wilson	
The Bolivar	230 Central Park West	Neo-Renaissance	1926	Nathan Korn	
239 Central Park West	239 Central Park West	Neo-Renaissance	1925	Henry M. Sugarman & Berger	
241 Central Park West	241 Central Park West	Art Deco	1930	Simon Schwartz & Arthur Gross	
Flemish Renaissance Revival townhouses	247, 248 and 249 Central Park West at W85	Neo-Renaissance	1887	Edward Angell	Three townhouses.
Rossleigh Court	251 Central Park West at W85	Beaux-Arts	1906	Mulliken and Moeller	
Orwell House	257 Central Park West at W86	Beaux-Arts	1905	Mulliken and Moeller	Originally known as the Central Park View, and then as The Hotel Peter Stuyvesant.
The White House	262 Central Park West	Neo-Renaissance	1928	Henry M. Sugarman & Berger	
271 Central Park West	271 Central Park West	Neo-Renaissance	1912	Simon Schwartz & Arthur Gross	
275 Central Park West	275 Central Park West	Neo-Renaissance	1930	Emery Roth	
Walden School	1 West 88th Street	Classical Revival	1904	Louis Korn	Demolished c. 1988; replaced by 280 Central Park West
The St. Urban	285 Central Park West	Second Empire	1904	Robert T. Lyons	
1 West 89th Street	1 West 89th Street	Queen Anne	1899	Clarence True	
293 Central Park West	293 Central Park West	Italianate	1899	Neville & Bagge	
295 Central Park West	295 Central Park West	Art Moderne	1940	Emery Roth	
The El Dorado	300 Central Park West	Art Deco	1931	Margon & Holder	At 30 floors, one of three buildings tied for the title of the district's tallest. Also an individual LPC landmark.
The Brookford	315 Central Park West	Neo-Renaissance	1911	Simon Schwartz & Arthur Gross	
The Ardsley	320 Central Park West	Art Deco	1931	Emery Roth	
322 Central Park West	322 Central Park West	Neo-Renaissance and Gothic Revival	1925	George Blum and Edward Blum	
The Rudolph	325 Central Park West	Neo-Renaissance	1899 (Completed in 1900)	George F. Pelham	
327 Central Park West	327 Central Park West	Neo-Renaissance	1928	Nathan Korn	
The Turin	333 Central Park West	Neo-Renaissance	1909	Robert J. Bodker	
336 Central Park West	336 Central Park West	Art Deco and Egyptian Revival	1929	Simon Schwartz & Arthur Gross	Undulating terra-cotta cornices at the top of the building and the water tower suggest Egyptian influences.
350 Central Park West	350 Central Park West	Neo-Renaissance	1928	Jacob M. Felson	
Romanesque Revival townhouses	352, 353, 354, and 355 Central Park West, and 1 West 95th Street	Romanesque Revival	1892	G.A. Schellenger	Five townhouses; 3 (352 and 353 Central Park West and 1 West 95th Street) were demolished c.1992 and replaced by 353 Central Park West, a 19-story building. The remaining two (354 and 355 Central Park West) are individual LPC landmarks.
360 Central Park West	360 Central Park West	Neo-Renaissance	1928	Rosario Candela	
First Church of Christ, Scientist	1 West 96th Street	Beaux-Arts	1903	John Mervin Carrère and Thomas Hastings	Also an individual LPC landmark.

=== Non-contributing properties ===
Building name	Address	Architecture	Built	Architect(s)	Remarks
80 Central Park West	80 Central Park West		1965		

== Significance ==
The Central Park West Historic District is significant, in regards to the National Register, for its architecture and its character as a cohesive residential area. The district is located along one of the city's finest residential streets and consists mostly of apartment buildings which are among some of the earliest in New York.

With the 1990 designation, the LPC developed the theme that the strength of the historic district lay in its diversity. The Commission called the buildings in the district brashly "commercial" and "stylistically diverse." The Commission went on to stress the importance of the district's special skyline that challenged the whole of the New York skyline. "The stylistically diverse buildings of Central Park West create a streetscape and a skyline which is exuberant and varied as to scale, height and form", the Commission stated.
