= Park and Tilford Building =

The Park and Tilford Building could refer to one of the following buildings in Manhattan:

- Park and Tilford Building (Lenox Avenue), historic commercial building on Lenox Avenue in Harlem
- Park and Tilford Building (72nd Street), former grocery and current residential building on West 72nd Street
