= Meeting House for the New York Society of Ethical Culture =

Building in Manhattan, New York

Coordinates: 40°46′16″N 73°58′48″W

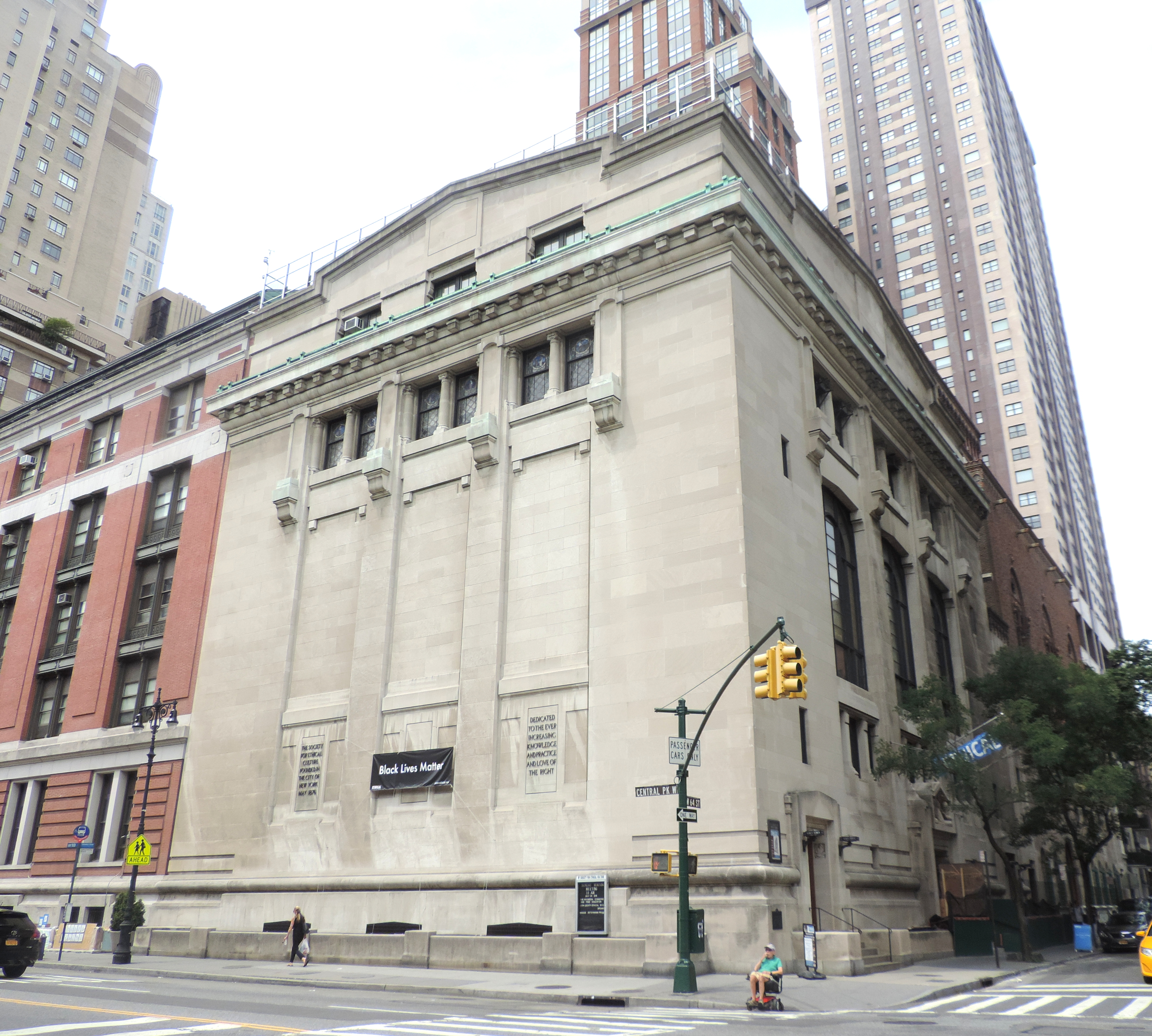
Meeting House for the New York Society of Ethical Culture

The Meeting House for the New York Society of Ethical Culture is an Art Nouveau building located within the Central Park West Historic District in New York City. The building was designed by Robert D. Kohn.

== History ==
Construction for the meeting house began in 1909—nearly a decade after the New York Society for Ethical Culture bought the land on Central Park West between 63rd and 64th streets—and was completed in 1910. Originally, the Society had been meeting in Carnegie Hall, but decided to build a meeting house of their own. The architect of the building, and a lifelong member of the Society for Ethical culture as well as one of its presidents, Robert D. Kohn, juxtaposed the style of the meeting house with the style of the society's school that shared the same block, Ethical Culture School. The school, which had been completed in 1904, is a five-story, brick building, with large windows facing the expansive Central Park on the other side of the avenue. The school had, however, been designed by other architects: John Carrère and Thomas Hastings. Kohn did not design the meeting house to match the school; rather, he imagined the meeting house in the Art Nouveau style, which effectively conflicted with, but also complemented, the typical image of the school.

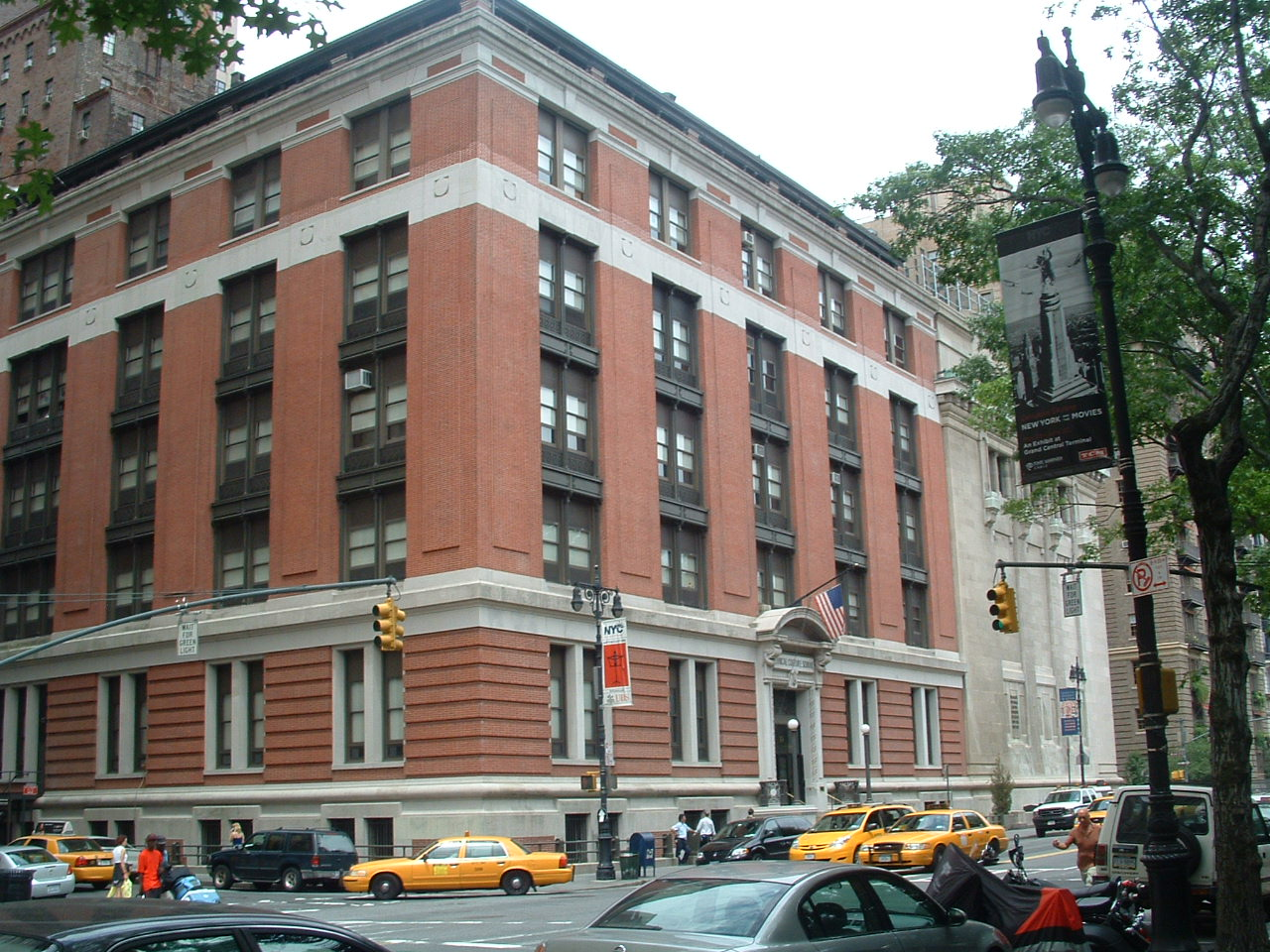
33 Central Park West (Ethical Culture School)

Thus, for much of the twentieth century, the meeting house has remained, effectively, the same as it had been done when it was constructed. However, in 1966, the Society for Ethical Culture, along the Y.M.C.A, which was right beside the meeting house, were approached by a developer and former chairman of the City Planning Commission, William F.R. Ballard, and offered a deal to complete the strip of buildings on the block (between 63rd and 64th) street in order to put in a forecourt because of the close vicinity to Lincoln Center. Ultimately, the project did not go through because of the flurry of protests from both the Y.M.C.A and the Society for Ethical Culture.

=== Landmark dispute ===
In the late 1970s, the Society for Ethical Culture in New York attempted to annul the landmark statuses for its meeting house and school, both located on Central Park West, because they wanted to redevelop the area. The reason for this was because the land, in the over seventy years that the Society had owned it, had appreciated greatly in value, and the Society wanted to capitalize on this change. The Society's leaders were not planning on using the land to advance the wealth of the organization, but rather to fund its charitable and philanthropic efforts as well as the Ethical Culture School, which was the justification for their legal action against the landmark status. Specifically, the Society argued that the landmark statuses of both buildings were inhibiting their economic agency over the land because the Society was not able to change any part of the land due to the restrictive historical landmark status. Nevertheless, in Society of Ethical Culture in the City of New York v. Spatt, the court, and the judge presiding over the case, ruled in favor of keeping the landmark statuses for the meeting house and the school, effectively ruling against any of the future actions proposed by the Society. The court decided that, in reality, the Society's claims of economic hardship due to the landmark statuses was unfounded, and that it appeared that Society, instead, simply wanted to make money off of the land, without any care for the historical importance of either the school or the meeting house.

=== 21st century ===
In 2001, the Society for Ethical Culture began to restore and renovate, at that point, the nearly century-old meeting house. The purpose of the renovation was, primarily, to repair the roof, and also restore the original masonry of the building. The project was undertaken by architect Walter Melvin, and the budget, for the overall restoration, was $1,022,000. The meeting house celebrated its 100th anniversary on October 23, 2010. The celebration included both a new dedication ceremony as well as a proclamation issued from the Mayor of New York, at the time, Michael Bloomberg. The proclamation declared that that date to be, within the boundaries of New York City, "New York Society for Ethical Culture Day," specifically citing the great importance of the Society and its philanthropic efforts on New York culture.

== Architecture ==
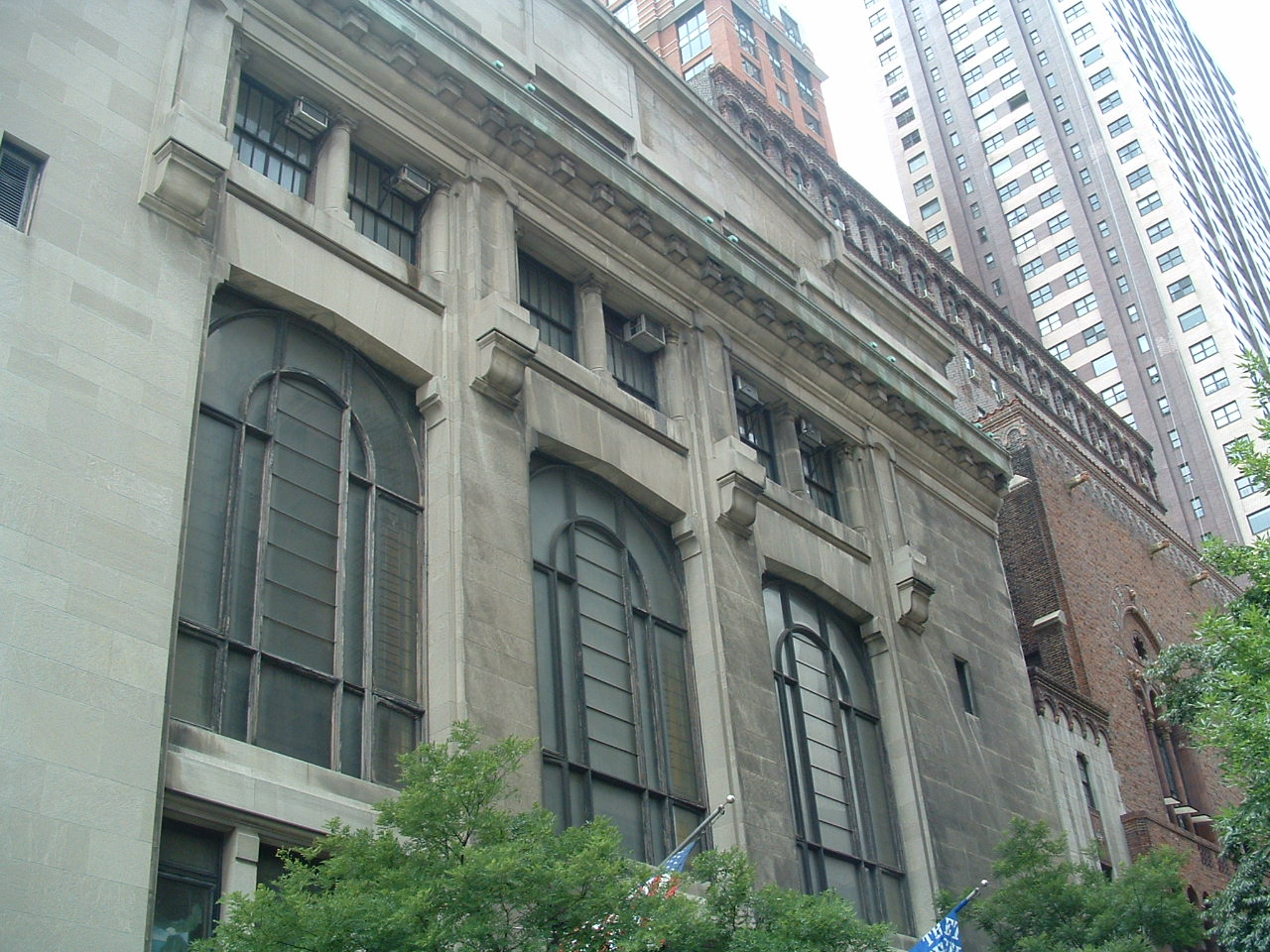
2 West 64th Street (Ethical Culture Meeting House)

The central idea of Kohn's design for the meeting house was the idea of simplicity. The exterior of the building is made of white Bedford stone, with few details carved into the stone. Besides the eight niches, the building's exterior stone is relatively simple. Above the wall that faces Central Park and Central Park West, there is a cornice, decorated more so than anything else on the exterior, that connects the meeting house to the Society's other building, the next door Ethical Culture School. Because of the plainness of the exterior wall of building, where there are no windows at the street level that peer into the inside quarters of the building, there are two inscribed tablets that name the building and describe its purpose. However, the entirety of the exterior is not undecorated: Above the main entrance, there is a relief by Estelle Rumbold Kohn, which depicts eight separate figures, arranged in a vigil. Moreover, over the side entrances of the meeting house there are four, relatively small torch-bearing figures designed and crafted by Harriet F. Clark.

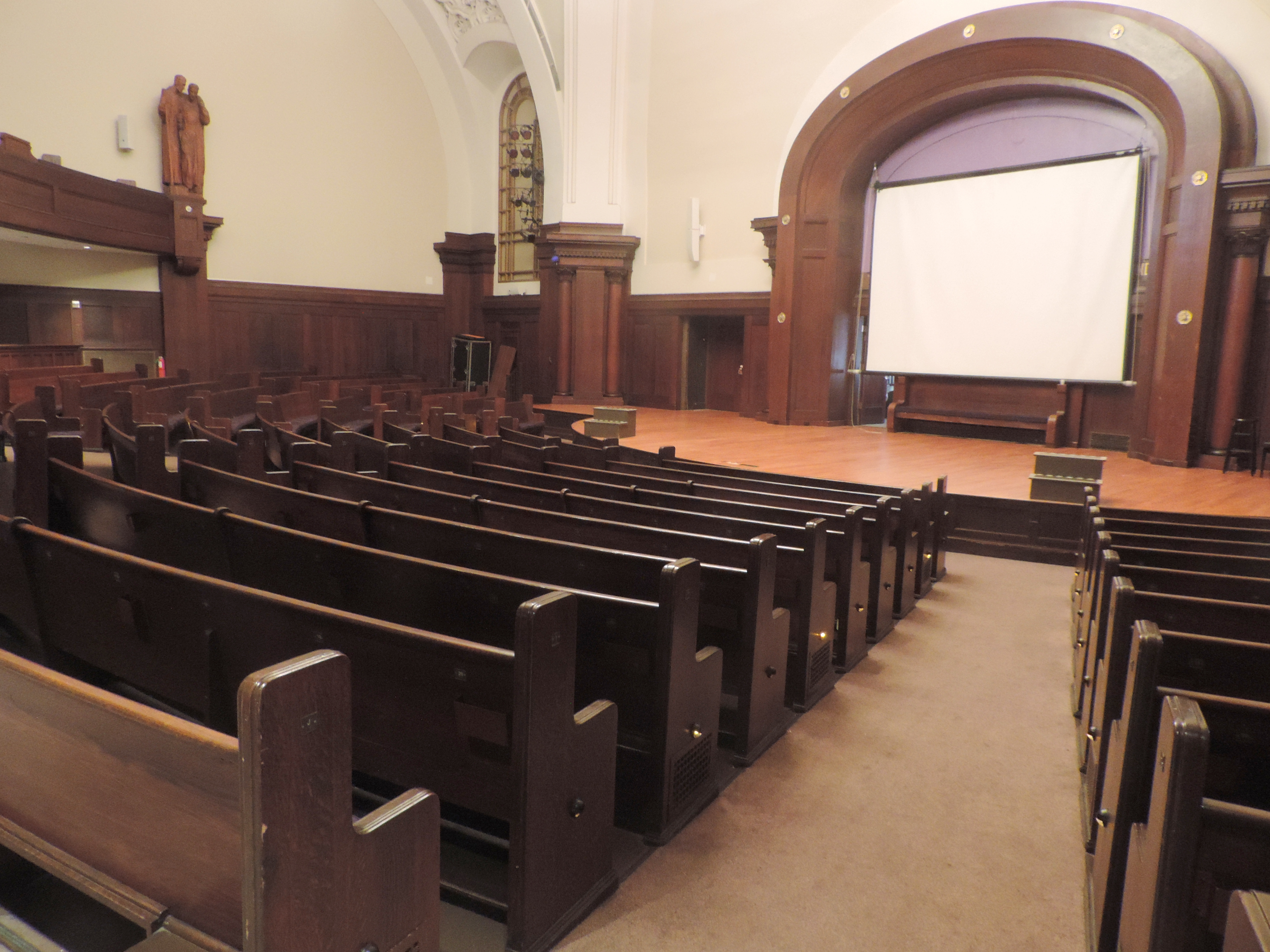
Concert hall stage & pews NYSEC jeh

In the same vein as the exterior of the meeting house, the interior of the hallowed space is also plain. The meeting space has a circular arrangement: all the seats surround the center platform in a radial fashion. The center platform, itself, also is different from other religious halls because the platform is barely above the seats, indicating that the speaker, physically and figuratively, comes from where the audience sits, and is not separate and apart from the people. Moreover, the simplicity of the design translates into the details of the exterior, from the lack of finishing on the wood to the undecorated walls. However, like the exterior, the interior is not entirely plain and undecorated: Inside the meeting house, there is a stained-glass window designed by Louis le Vaillant. There are also other stained-glass windows, namely the ones that face out onto Central Park West, which are the most visible to the public.

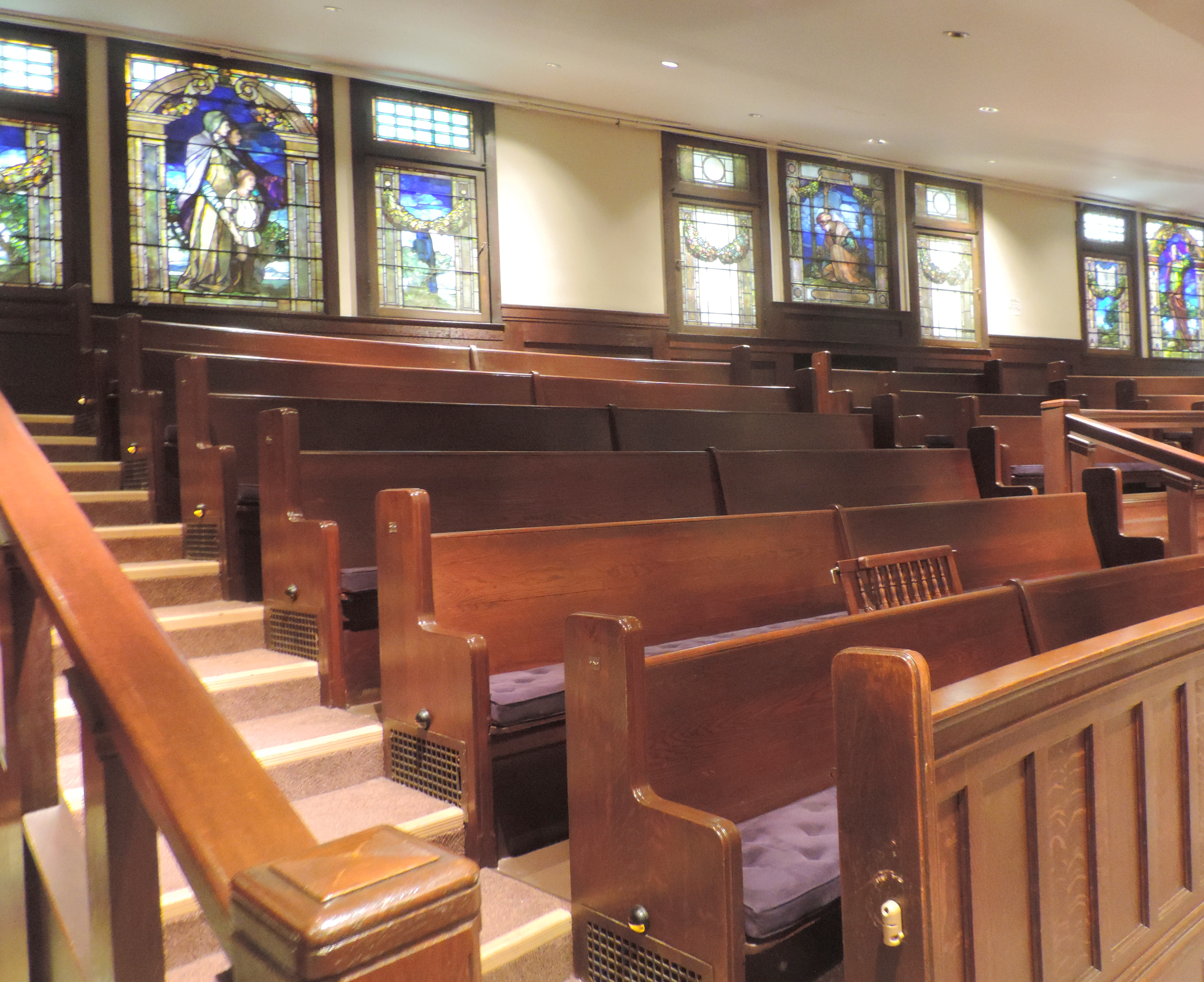
Back pews & stained glass NYSEC Concert hall jeh

The choice of a simple structure was a deliberate one on the part of Kohn; he wanted to depict a new style for both religious architecture in the city as well as the city's architectural style, as a whole. Primarily, Kohn wanted the structure to be different from other religious buildings in New York City because neither the meeting house nor the Society for Ethical were religious spaces, in reality, like that of a church or Christianity. Moreover, the plain exterior also pursued another argument of Kohn's: He wanted to pose an antithesis to the bustling modern life in the city. Since he felt that much of the city's architecture was garish and over-the-top, he designed the meeting house to be the complete opposite.
