= Schwartz & Gross =

American architectural firm (1901–63)

Schwartz & Gross was a New York City architectural firm active from at least 1901 to 1963, and which designed numerous apartment buildings in the city during the first half of the 20th century. The firm, together with the firm Neville & Bagge and the firm owned by George F. Pelham, accounted for about half the apartment houses in Manhattan's Morningside Heights neighborhood.

== Principals ==
Simon I. Schwartz and Arthur Gross were both American architects of Jewish background. The two met as students at the Hebrew Technical Institute, in Manhattan's East Village neighborhood, in the 1890s. After working for other firms, they founded their own company in 1902. They primarily designed apartment houses on the Upper East Side and the Upper West Side, and while the firm continued through at least 1963, the founders stopped personally designing buildings sometime after the Great Depression. Each died in the 1950s.

== Notable works ==
The firm was highly prominent during its most active years, designing, along with New York firms Neville & Bagge and George F. Pelham's firm, around half of the apartment buildings in Morningside Heights, as well as numerous other buildings throughout New York City. Schwartz & Gross designed eight of the historic buildings on Central Park West that are deemed contributing properties of the Central Park West Historic District, including 55 Central Park West, colloquially known as the "Ghostbusters Building" after its prominent appearance in that 1984 movie.

One building, Majestic Towers at 215 West 75th Street, was completed in 1924 as a brothel and de facto men's clubhouse, with hidden stairways and secret doorways. A bordello run by Polly Adler boasted such patrons as Robert Benchley, New York City mayor Jimmy Walker, and mobster Dutch Schultz. Another building 370 Riverside Drive was a home to many notable residents, including political theorist Hannah Arendt, among others.

Schwartz & Gross also designed at least one building on Long Island: The Wychwood, later converted to a building cooperative, in Great Neck, New York.
