= Ghostbusters building =

Ghostbusters building may refer to:

- 55 Central Park West - The New York City building in the film Ghostbusters where much of the film's haunting and finale takes place.
- Firehouse, Hook & Ladder Company 8 - The FDNY station whose exterior was famously used to depict the Ghostbusters' headquarters in the same film.
