= Holy Trinity Lutheran Church (Manhattan) =

Church in Manhattan, New York

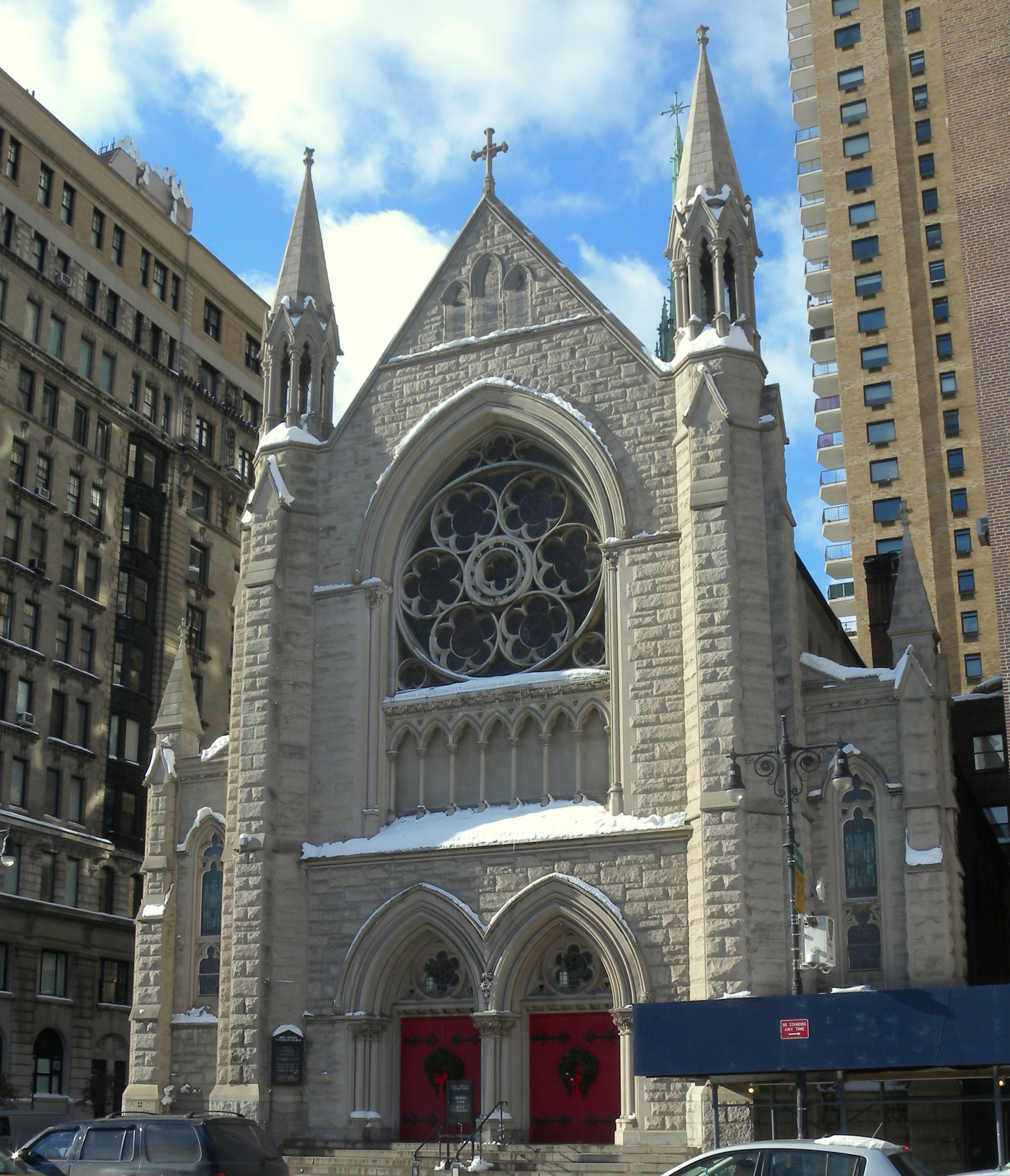
- (2010)

- Location within Manhattan

General information
- Architectural style: Gothic Revival architecture
- Location: Manhattan, New York City, US
- Coordinates: 40°46′20″N 73°58′46″W
- Construction started: 1902
- Completed: 1904
- Cost: $125,000.00
- Client: Evangelical Lutheran Church of the Holy Trinity of 1042 Madison Ave

Technical details
- Structural system: Stone masonry

Design and construction
- Architect: Schickel & Ditmars

Holy Trinity Lutheran Church is a Lutheran church located at 3 West 65th Street at the corner of Central Park West on the Upper West Side of Manhattan, New York City. It is a member of the Evangelical Lutheran Church in America.

The church is a double-height-over-basement stone structure with a rectory, and is located within the Central Park West Historic District, designated 1990 by the New York City Landmarks Preservation Commission.

== History ==
The congregation was founded in 1868 after splitting from St. James's Lutheran Church. Most New York Lutherans were German in the nineteenth century, and "Holy Trinity was one of a very few English-speaking Lutheran congregations. The first church was at 47 West 21st Street, in the edifice originally built for St. Paul's Reformed Dutch Church."

It was built between 1902 and 1904. The church building, designed by the noted architectural firm of Schickel & Ditmars, who were generally responsible for the designs of Roman Catholic commissions or other clients of German descent.

== Social programs ==
According to the church website, "Holy Trinity is most widely known for the Bach Vespers series, begun in 1968, the first instance in America where the cantatas of Bach could be heard regularly on their appointed day (designated by Bach himself) in the context of worship." The church's Bach Choir records hymns and liturgical music for Augsburg Fortress Publishing House. The church also hosts a soup kitchen for people suffering from AIDS and other sexually transmitted diseases.

== In popular culture ==
- In the 1970 film The Out-of-Towners, Gwen Kellerman recommends prayer to her husband George at the church in order to get through a night of havoc. They go inside to pray, only to be thrown out by television producers who are rehearsing for a taped service there.
- In the 1984 film Ghostbusters, the rampaging Stay Puft Marshmallow Man steps on and destroys the church, causing Peter Venkman to exclaim, "Nobody steps on a church in my town!"
