= 55 Central Park West =

Residential building in Manhattan, New York

- U.S. Historic district – Contributing property
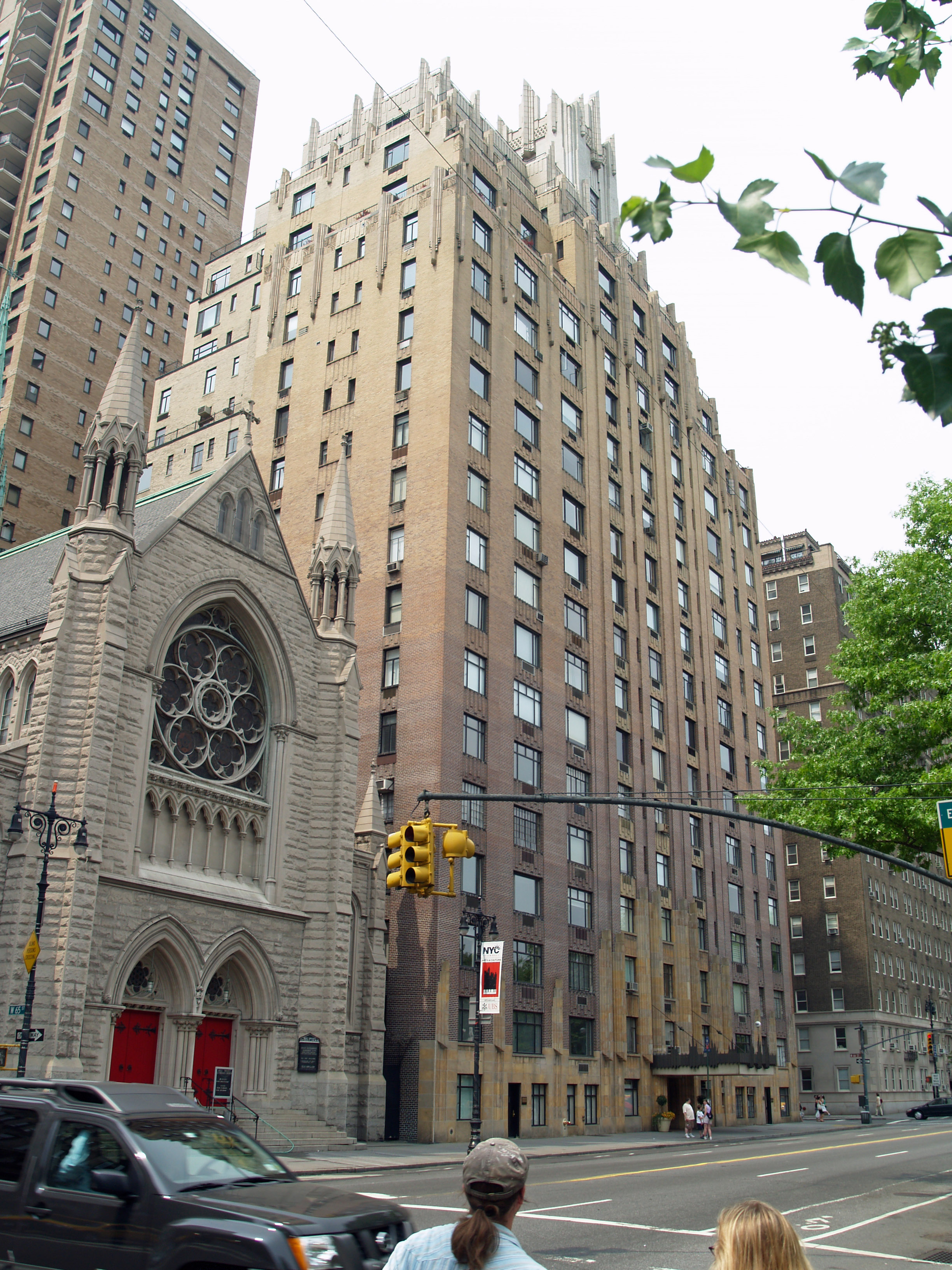
- 55 Central Park West and (to its left) Holy Trinity Lutheran Church

- Location within New York City Location within New York Location within the United States
- Location: Upper West Side, Manhattan, New York City, New York, USA
- Coordinates: 40.77223447°N 73.9791438°W
- Built: 1929
- Architect: Schwartz & Gross
- Architectural style: Art Deco
- Part of: Central Park West Historic District (ID82001189)
- Added to NRHP: November 9, 1982

55 Central Park West is a 19-floor housing cooperative on the Upper West Side of Manhattan in New York City. Built in 1929, it was designed by the architectural firm Schwartz & Gross. The building is a contributing property within the Central Park West Historic District, which is listed on the National Register of Historic Places. The building was popularized by the 1984 film Ghostbusters, whose storyline revolves heavily around it.

== History ==
Plans for the building, between 65th and 66th Streets, were filed by architectural firm Schwartz & Gross at the behest of Victor Earle and John C. Calhoun, for whom they were working. Earle, and his brother Guyon, had been actively developing the Upper West Side of New York City since the 1910s.

The structure is considered to be mostly "second tier" by the socialite New Yorkers who occupy most of the buildings along Central Park West. It was opened as a rental property in 1930. Its neighbor to the south is the earlier Holy Trinity Lutheran Church. Upon its opening Real Estate magazine praised it as resembling "Jungfrau, that most beloved snowcapped Alpine peak."

Musician Rudy Vallee and industrial designer Raymond Loewy were two of the building's earliest residents. Ginger Rogers was one of its residents during her Broadway days in the early 1930s. Hat designer Lilly Dache with husband Jean Despres of Coty Perfume were residents following their 1931 marriage until 1935. Other residents of the building have included Donna Karan, Calvin Klein, Ring Lardner, Jr., and Marsha Mason. The duplex penthouse on the 19th and 20th floors was owned by composer Jerry Herman in the 1970s, before he sold it for $1 million to Klein (who later sold it, and then bought it again in the 1990s). David Geffen later purchased it for $6 million, before selling it for $8.6 million to music executive Steve Gottlieb, who in turn listed it the week his record label TVT Records filed for bankruptcy. He sold the apartment to Marc Lasry (co-founder and CEO of the Avenue Capital Group) for $33 million in 2014.

== Architecture ==
The building was the first fully Art Deco structure on the street.

=== Facade ===
The exterior of the building is somewhat non-traditional. As the brick facade rises from the ground it changes shade from deep purple to yellow-white. Color was widely used during the 1920s as a tool in architecture for overall effects. The rental brochure stated: "new modernistic design of exterior with beautiful shaded color scheme". The New Yorker's architecture critic, George S. Chappell, praised the building's use of color, said, "the total effect is exhilarating."

=== Interior ===
When the building opened in 1930 it had apartments ranging from three to nine rooms, the largest of which had four bedrooms. The apartments featured a dropped living room, developed by the Earle brothers, which set the interior apart from most others constructed around the same period. An original rental brochure shows the dropped living room nearly entirely open to the entrance gallery; traditionally the gallery was held as a different room.

== Significance ==
The building is a contributing property to the Central Park West Historic District, which was added to the National Register of Historic Places on November 9, 1982. It is also a contributing property to the New York City's Upper West Side / Central Park West local historic district. Benjamin Schwarz, writing for The Atlantic, said of the buildings along Central Park West, "no endeavor on earth is more arduous than getting into one of these buildings," and specifically cited the "details of Donna Karan's deal for her digs at 55 Central Park West."

The building holds significance in American popular culture as it was prominently featured in the 1984 comedy Ghostbusters. In the film, "550 Central Park West" – known also as The Shandor Building, The Shandor Apartments or "Spook Central" – was the residence of the Ghostbusters' first client, cellist Dana Barrett (Sigourney Weaver). They later learn it had been designed and constructed by insane architect and surgeon Ivo Shandor, who founded and led a secret society in 1920, The Cult of Gozer, dedicated to the worship of Gozer the Gozerian. Since Ghostbusters first hit theaters, 55 Central Park West has been known as the "Ghostbusters Building". The building's appearance in the film differs from its actual appearance. Eight additional floors and a large rooftop temple were added to exterior shots of it via matte painting by Production designer/Art director John DeCuir. The Gozerian Temple consisted of its massive, ornate shrine, altars, obelisks and the iconic gargoyle statues depicting the Terror Dogs, Zuul the Gatekeeper and Vinz Clortho the Keymaster.

The building also appears in the 2003 Christmas film Elf, as the home of Buddy’s human family.
