= Second Presbyterian Church (Manhattan) =

Church in Manhattan, New York

Coordinates: 40.761°N 73.975°W

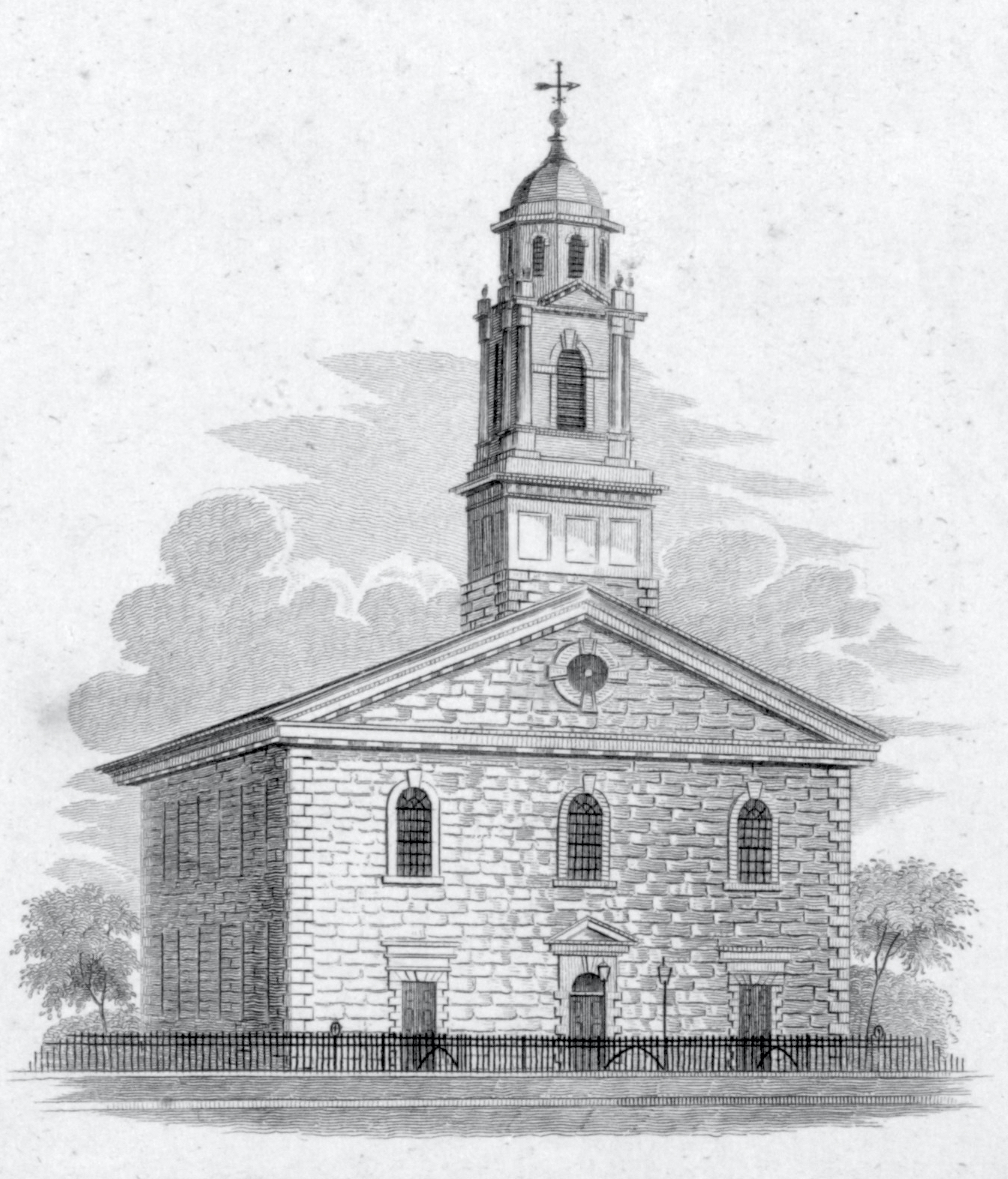
- Cedar Street church in 1830
- Interactive map of the Second Presbyterian Church area

General information
- Architectural style: Neoclassical architecture
- Location: Manhattan, New York City
- Opened: 1768
- Demolished: after 1837

The Second Presbyterian Church, founded in 1756 and incorporated in 1784 as the Scotch Presbyterian Church, is a church in Manhattan, New York City.

== History ==
It built a sanctuary on the south side of Cedar Street, between Broadway and Nassau Street, in 1768. In 1837, the congregation moved to Grand Street. It later moved to 14th Street.

In the 1890s, the church built a traditional sanctuary with separate Manse and School buildings between 95th and 96th Streets at Central Park West. Following mergers early in the 20th century, in 1917 the congregation changed its name officially to Second Presbyterian Church.

In 1928, the decision was made to demolish the existing buildings for a new sanctuary in a 16-story apartment building at the same location 360 Central Park West designed by Rosario Candela.

Second Presbyterian remains an active, open and affirming congregation of the Presbyterian Church (USA). Worship is on Sundays at 10:15am.
