= Park and Tilford Building (72nd Street) =

Building in Manhattan, New York

Park and Tilford Building (100 West 72nd Street)
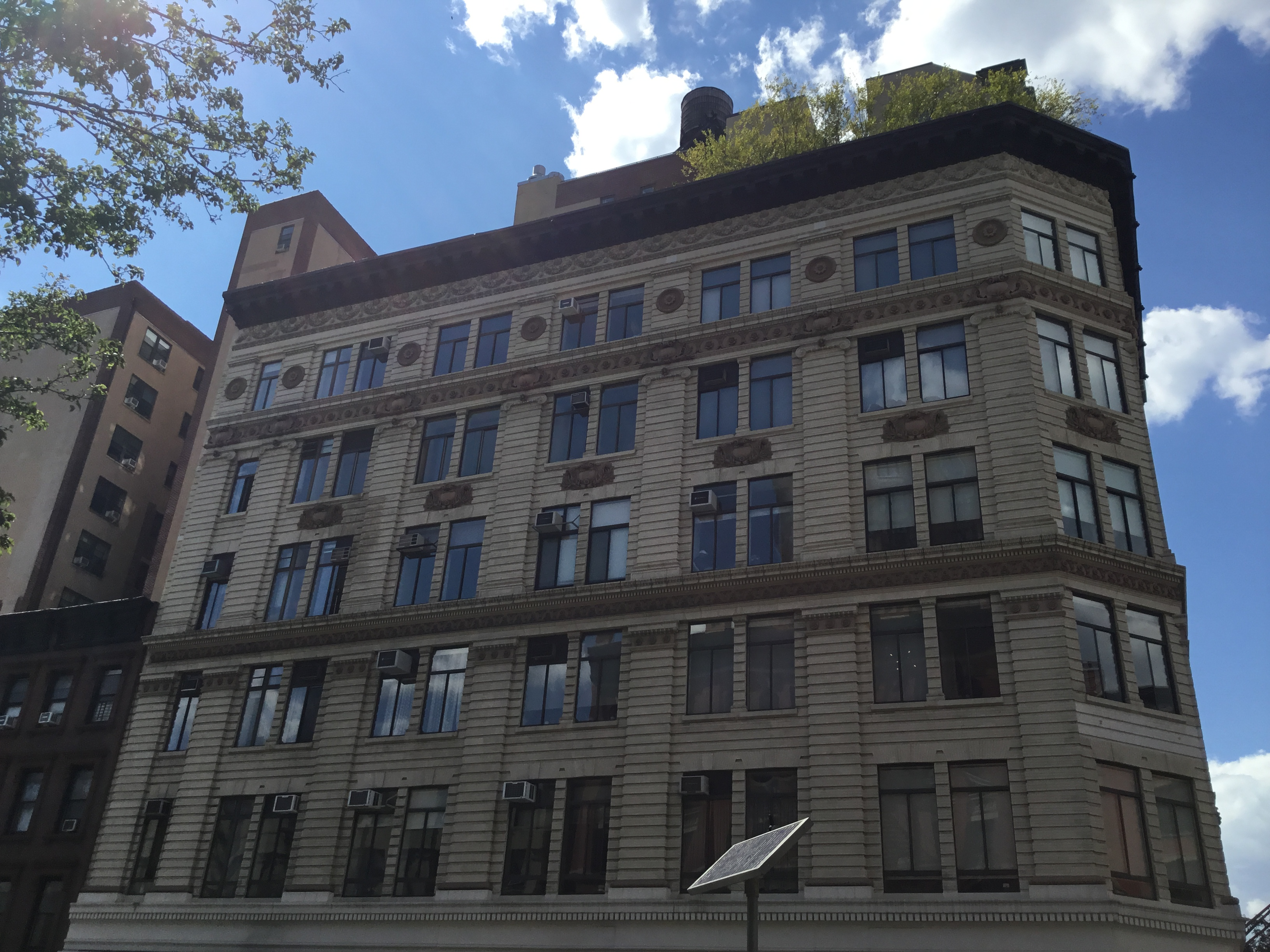
- The building in 2022
- Interactive map of the Park and Tilford Building (100 West 72nd Street) area

General information
- Status: Completed
- Type: Commercial (original); Residential cooperative (current)
- Architectural style: Renaissance Revival
- Location: 100 West 72nd Street, Upper West Side, Manhattan, New York City, United States
- Coordinates: 40.7773°N 73.9792°W
- Completed: 1893
- Client: Park and Tilford Company
- Owner: Residential cooperative (35 units)

Technical details
- Floor count: 7
- Floor area: 47,849 square feet (4,445.3 m^{2})

Design and construction
- Architect: McKim, Mead & White

The Park and Tilford Building at 100 West 72nd Street is a seven-story Renaissance Revival structure on the southwest corner of Columbus Avenue in the Upper West Side neighborhood of Manhattan, New York City, United States. Designed by McKim, Mead & White and completed in 1893, the building was originally constructed for the grocer Park and Tilford. The New-York Tribune described it at its opening as "a decided architectural ornament to the neighborhood." The building is a contributing property to the Upper West Side/Central Park West Historic District, designated by the New York City Landmarks Preservation Commission on April 24, 1990. Today it operates as a 35-unit residential cooperative with one commercial unit.

== History ==
=== Origins ===
John Mason Tilford and Joseph Park first met while employed as clerks at the New York grocery firm of Benjamin Albro. In 1840, when Tilford was 25 years old, the two partners founded a retail shop on Carmine Street in Greenwich Village. Men of the Century (1896) described the venture as having begun "in a small way".

By 1886 the firm had grown to four New York stores and a branch in Paris used primarily for merchandising and importing. Park & Tilford catered to a wealthy clientele, stocking wines, confectionery, gourmet foods, cigars, and personal items.

The firm's Fifth Avenue flagship store, built in 1883, prompted The New York Times to describe Park and Tilford as "the very beau ideal of what a first class grocery store should be".

Following John Tilford's death in January 1891, his son Frank was elected to succeed him. In March 1892, Frank Tilford purchased a one-story commercial building at the southwest corner of Columbus Avenue and 72nd Street as the site for a new store.

McKim, Mead & White—whose other commissions included Madison Square Garden (1890) and the Frederick Vanderbilt Mansion at Hyde Park—received the commission for the new structure. The firm filed plans on April 22, 1892 for a "six-story brick, stone and terra cotta building" at a cost of $85,000.

=== Opening (1893) ===
The building opened on September 23, 1893. The New York Times reported that it "was attended by hundreds, who admired the building and the artistic display of goods", and added, "There is no business building more handsome on the west side." The New-York Tribune called it "a decided architectural ornament to the neighborhood".

The Tribune noted that Upper West Side residents had "suffered much inconvenience by being obliged to order their groceries and household provisions from down-town houses", and that the new store was "as complete and perfect in every detail as the most exacting buyers can demand". The Tribune further described the ground floor merchandise as including "a most desirable and extensive assortment of superior perfumery and toilet requisites" alongside champagnes and imported French delicacies.

Frank Tilford subsequently built a personal mansion at 119 West 72nd Street, directly across from the store. The Real Estate Record described the residence as "palatial" in 1895.

=== Fire (1916) ===
The building's basement and sub-basement housed a candy-making operation. In July 1909 the firm upgraded the facility with a refrigeration machine for the candy factory.

On the afternoon of December 17, 1916, six workers in the sub-basement discovered a fire and pulled the alarm. Before they could reach exits, an ammonia tank connected to the refrigeration system exploded. As firefighters responded, additional tanks exploded. The first group of seven firefighters to enter the sub-basement with a hose line were overcome by fumes before reaching the elevator. A second crew from Hook and Ladder 40 entered to retrieve them, but most of that crew were in turn overcome by fumes. Deputy Chief Burns ultimately refused to allow additional personnel inside.

The building was saved when firefighters equipped with oxygen helmets worked their way into the fume-filled cellar, gradually clearing the air sufficiently for others to enter. The Tribune reported that approximately 300 Park and Tilford employees, described as "most of them women", evacuated through smoke and fumes without disorder after a fire drill signal.

=== Papae Building ===
Park and Tilford sold the building in 1920. In 1925, architect Bernard Hersbrun oversaw its renovation into offices and retail space, after which it became known as the Papae Building. The ground floor was subdivided into retail stores, a bowling alley was installed in the basement, and the upper floors became offices and meeting rooms.

The meeting rooms were leased by labor unions, political clubs, and social organizations. Among the tenants were the Boston Terrier Club of New York, which held officer elections there in December 1932; the New York State Association of Retail Meat Dealers, which met there in 1933 to debate a 48-hour work week; and the Retail Druggists Association, which gathered in the building shortly after the repeal of Prohibition to petition the governor regarding the sale of alcohol in drug stores.

In 1933, a 22-year-old named Arthur Fried rented an office in the building and created letterheads for a fictitious organization, Cafeteria Local Union 460 of the I.W.W. He then visited cafeteria owners, demanded payment of union wages, and hired picketers at a dollar per day to pressure those who refused. Cafeteria owners who paid $25 had the pickets withdrawn. Fried was arrested after one owner contacted police and charged with attempted extortion.

=== Residential cooperative ===
In 1972, the building was converted to a 35-unit residential cooperative. The original McKim, Mead and White ground-floor treatment had been removed during an earlier renovation; architecturally sympathetic fluted pilasters were installed in its place. The pressed metal cornice cresting at the roofline was also removed at some point during the twentieth century.

== Architecture ==
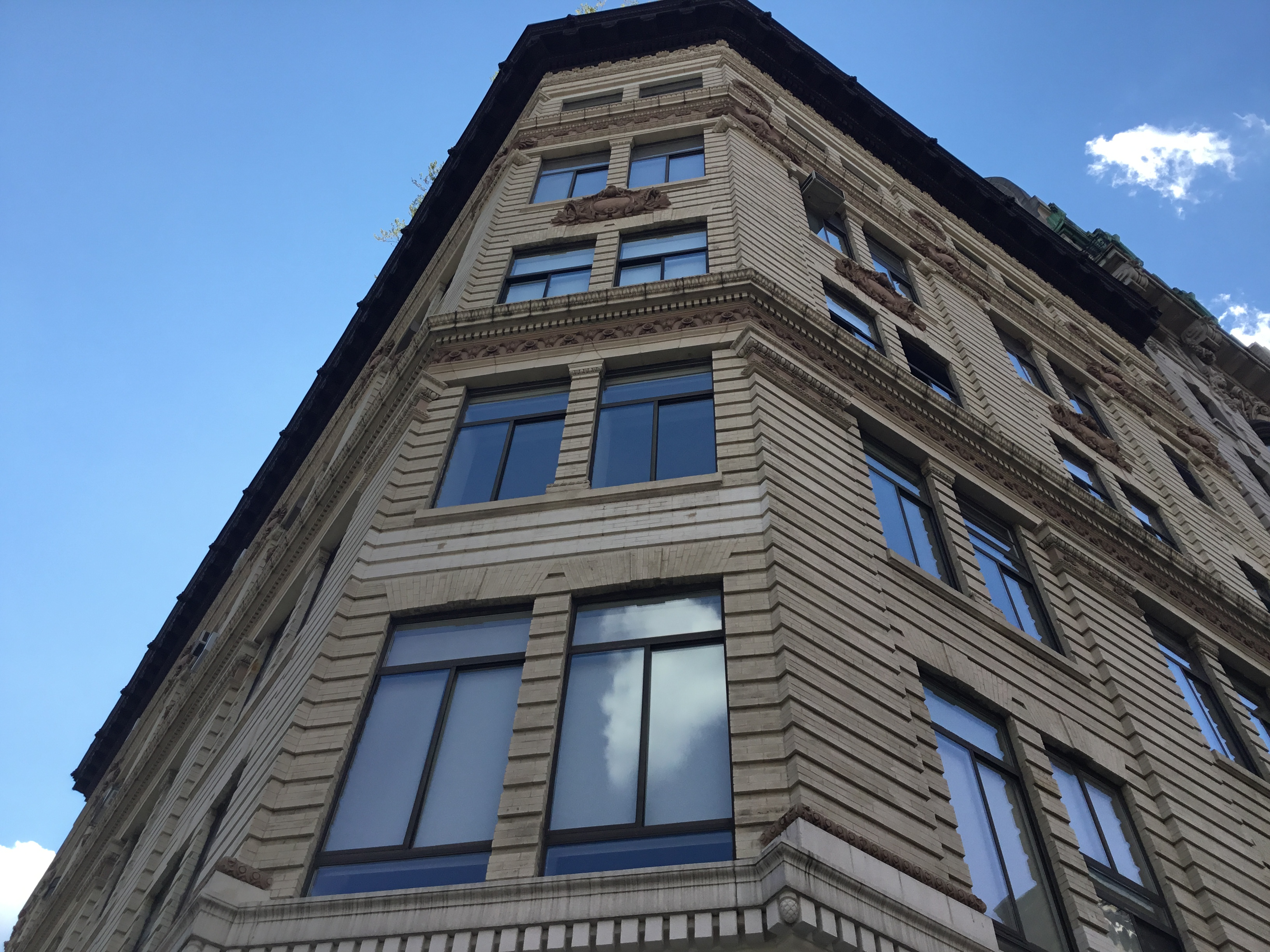
Chamfered corner at Columbus Avenue and 72nd Street

The design uses Roman brick, Indiana limestone, terra cotta accents, and a chamfered corner to maximize natural light. The rusticated brick upper floors are divided horizontally into three sections by wide terra cotta bands. A neo-Classical frieze runs beneath a pressed metal cornice at the roofline. At street level, the original store had large show windows between heavy granite piers supporting an entablature bearing the store's name. The entrance was flanked by fluted Scamozzi columns and topped with a large circular window. The building's rusticated masonry, terra cotta bands, and neo-classical frieze reflect its Renaissance Revival design. The chamfered corner at Columbus Avenue and 72nd Street remains one of the structure's most distinctive features.

As of 2025, 100 West 72nd Street contains 35 residential apartments and one commercial unit, totaling approximately 47,849 square feet across seven floors. The interiors retain high ceilings, original columns, and riveted steel beams from the original construction. The building is a contributing property to the Upper West Side/Central Park West Historic District, designated by the New York City Landmarks Preservation Commission on April 24, 1990.
