= 360 Central Park West =

Apartment building in Manhattan, New York

- U.S. Historic district – Contributing property
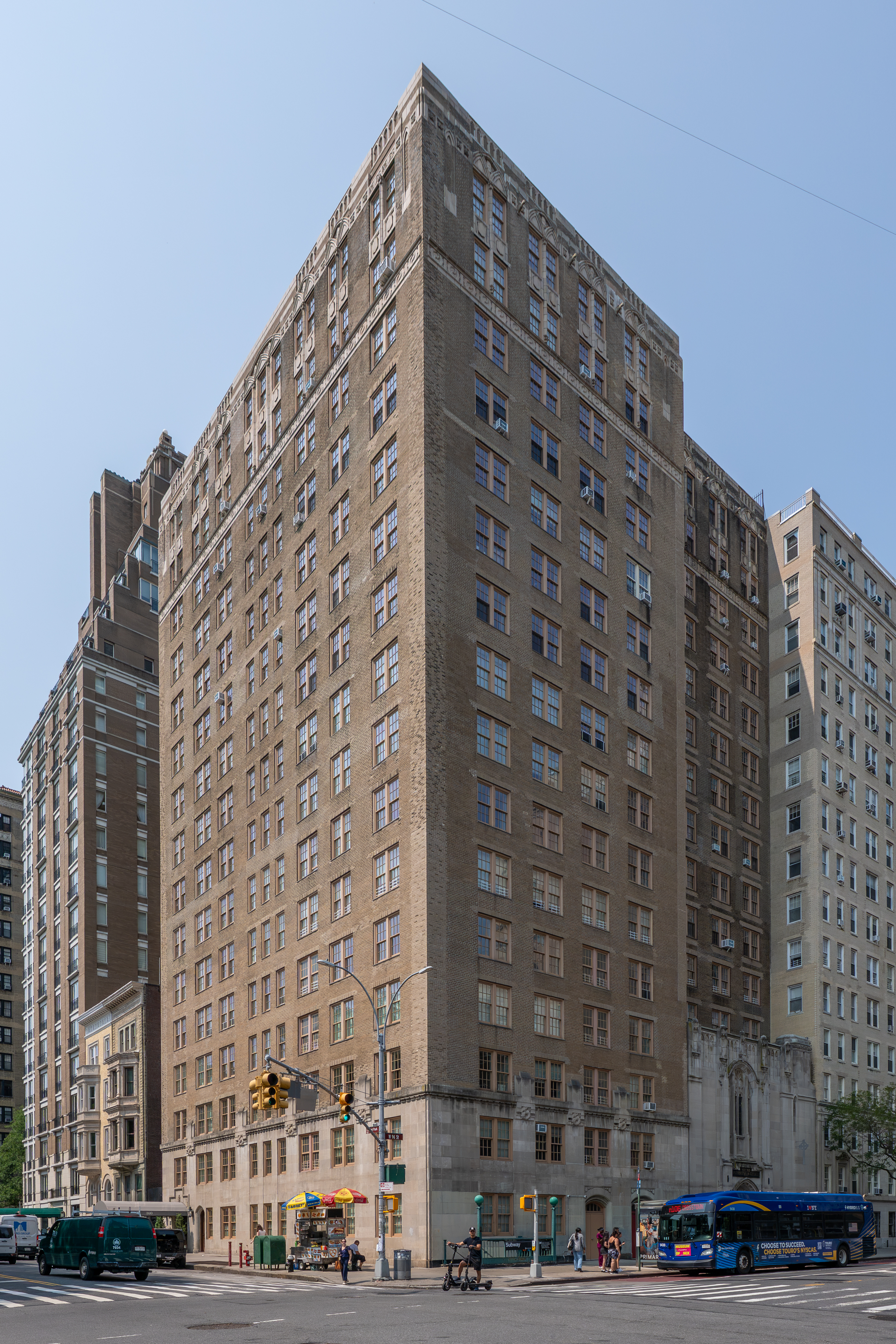

- Location within New York City Location within New York Location within the United States
- Location: Manhattan, New York City, New York United States
- Coordinates: 40.791605°N 73.965199°W
- Built: 1928
- Architect: Rosario Candela
- Architectural style: Neo-Renaissance
- Part of: Central Park West Historic District (ID82001189)
- Added to NRHP: November 9, 1982

360 Central Park West is a 16-story apartment building on the Upper West Side of Manhattan in New York City. Designed by Rosario Candela, it is a contributing property to the Central Park West Historic District.

== History ==
In 1930 Prudence-Bonds Corporation issued $1.4 million (equivalent to $26,982,072 in 2025) in Prudence Certificates covering the first mortgage by the Second Presbyterian Church and Vinross Realities Inc. The church was demolished in 1928 to make way for the apartment building, which includes the congregation's present church.

By the end of the 20th century, the building's developers started to merge small unit apartments to create villa-style penthouses.
