= The Langham (apartment building) =

Apartment building in Manhattan, New York

- U.S. Historic district – Contributing property
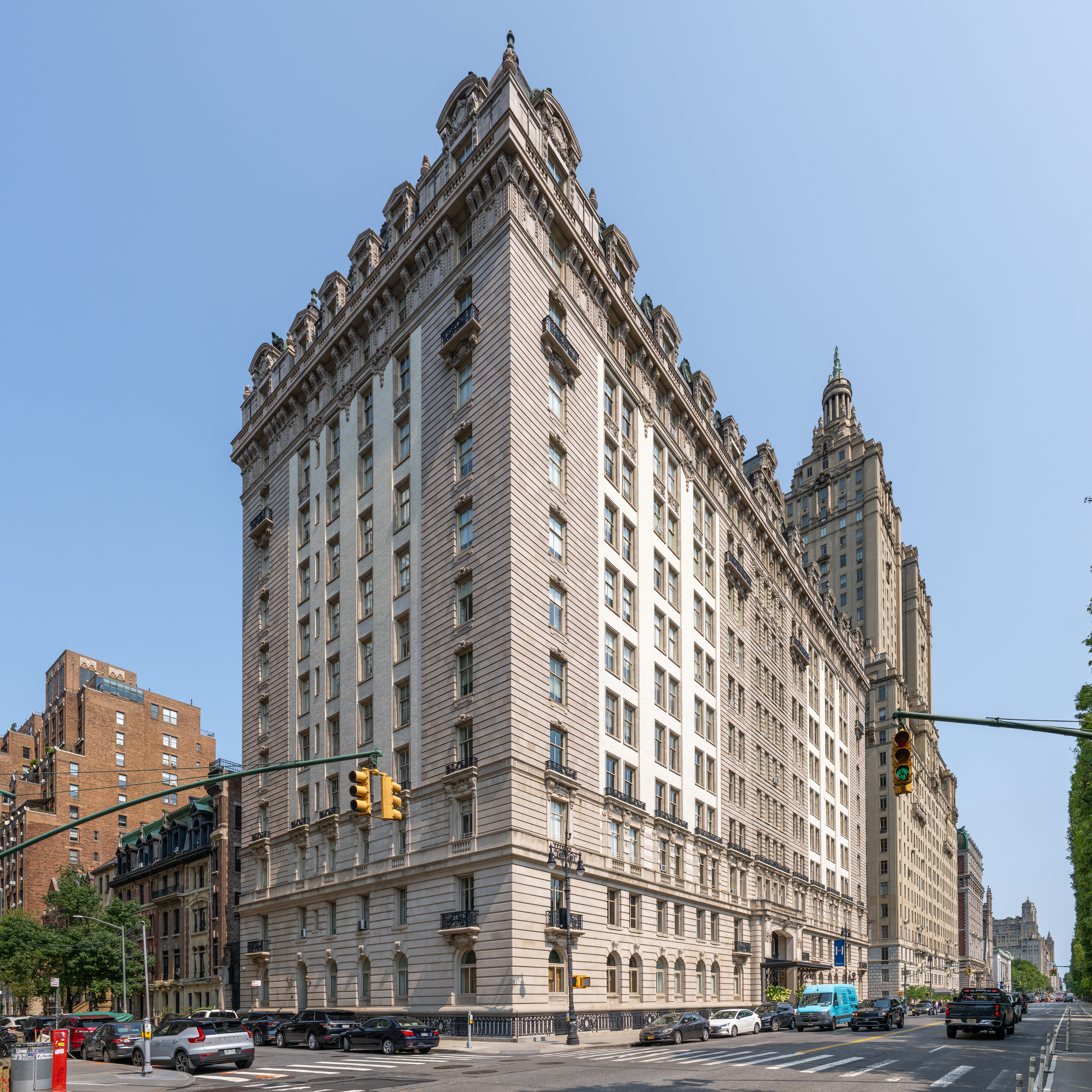
- Location: Manhattan, New York City, United States
- Coordinates: 40°46′38″N 73°58′32″W
- Built: 1905–1907
- Architect: Clinton and Russell
- Architectural style: Second Empire
- Part of: Central Park West Historic District (ID82001189)
- Added to NRHP: November 9, 1982

The Langham is a luxury apartment building located at 135 Central Park West on the Upper West Side of Manhattan, New York City. After the site was unused for more than 15 years, the building was constructed between 1905 and 1907. Built at a cost of US $2 million, the structure included modern amenities, such as an ice maker in every apartment. The building was designed in the French Second Empire style by architects Clinton and Russell. It was listed as a contributing property to the federal government designated Central Park West Historic District on November 9, 1982. It is also part of the city-designated West 73rd–74th Street Historic District and Upper West Side/Central Park West Historic District.

== History ==
In 1902 the property that The Langham stands on was owned by the same family, the Clarks, who owned the prestigious Dakota. The Clark family acquired the property during a period from 1880–1884 when they acquired numerous properties, including the site of The Dakota. The building is currently owned by the Manocherian family. Located at what is now 135 Central Park West, The Langham occupies the blockfront between West 73rd and 74th Streets. The location remained vacant until the Clark family liquidated it in 1902. At first the property would not sell because they had placed an unusual restriction on it, no building built could exceed the height of The Dakota, which stands across 73rd Street. Apparently, the Clarks could not sell the site with the restriction in place as the sale deed from later in 1902 indicated only a standard "restriction on stables and billboards."

The site was purchased by Abraham Boehm and Lewis Coon but remained vacant until 1904. Architects Clinton and Russell, working for Boehm and Coon, filed plans for a US$2 million building in 1904.

By September 1906 the finishing touches were being applied and The Langham was fully complete and open for rental in 1907. The reporting from The New York Times lavished praise upon the building when it opened, noting among its modern amenities "real ice."

In each icebox is an extra coil of pipe, through which a freezing mixture circulates, so that if a tenant wants a piece of real ice, without going to the trust for it, all he has to do is fill a small metal pan with water, place it within the coil, and in a few minutes its contents will be frozen solid. (Emphasis original).

When The Langham was completed in 1907, its apartments rented for $500 per month and attracted wealthy and successful tenants early on. William Brown, president of The New York Central Railroad lived here, Irving Bloomingdale, son of the founder of Bloomingdale's, moved into The Langham from a limestone townhouse when it opened. Isadore Saks moved from the Art Deco Majestic to the Langham with his son Joseph. Martin Beck, head of the Orpheum Theater chain, was another prominent early resident. He would go on to establish the Palace Theater, where Charlie Chaplin made his American stage debut. Other famous inhabitants have included Mick Jagger, Maureen O'Sullivan and her daughter Mia Farrow, Robert Ryan, Basil Rathbone and Carly Simon. The building has cinematic appearances in Love at First Bite, and in the movie Hannah and Her Sisters scenes were filmed inside the apartment of Maureen O'Sullivan and Mia Farrow.

In 2006 the building was put up for sale. A writer for the New York Sun reported that estimates of the price went as high as $600 million.

== Architecture ==
The Langham, occupying the entire western side of Central Park West between 73rd and 74th streets, was designed by architects Clinton & Russell. It is variously cited as being in the Beaux-Arts or French Second Empire style. The lowest two stories are clad in rusticated blocks of limestone, and there is an ornate segmental arch and a glass-and-iron canopy at the Central Park West entrance. The third floor has brick-and-limestone panels and stone balustrades, while the fourth story has iron balconies. The fourth through eleventh floors have limited ornamentation, divided into seven sections clad in either terracotta, limestone, or brick. There are decorative terracotta windows beneath the cornice. The mansard roof has terracotta dormers and four smaller hip roofs. The Langham has U-shaped floors surrounding interior light courts. Each floor originally had four apartments, which were later subdivided further.

== Landmark designations ==
The Langham was listed as a contributing property to the Central Park West Historic District when the district was listed on the U.S. National Register of Historic Places on November 9, 1982. It is also part of the New York City Landmarks Preservation Commission's city-designated West 73rd–74th Street Historic District, designated in 1982, and the LPC's Upper West Side/Central Park West Historic District, designated in 1990.

== Sources ==
- Central Park West - West 73rd/74th Street Historic District (PDF) (Report). New York City Landmarks Preservation Commission. April 19, 1973.
