= Harperly Hall =

Apartment building in Manhattan, New York

- U.S. Historic district – Contributing property
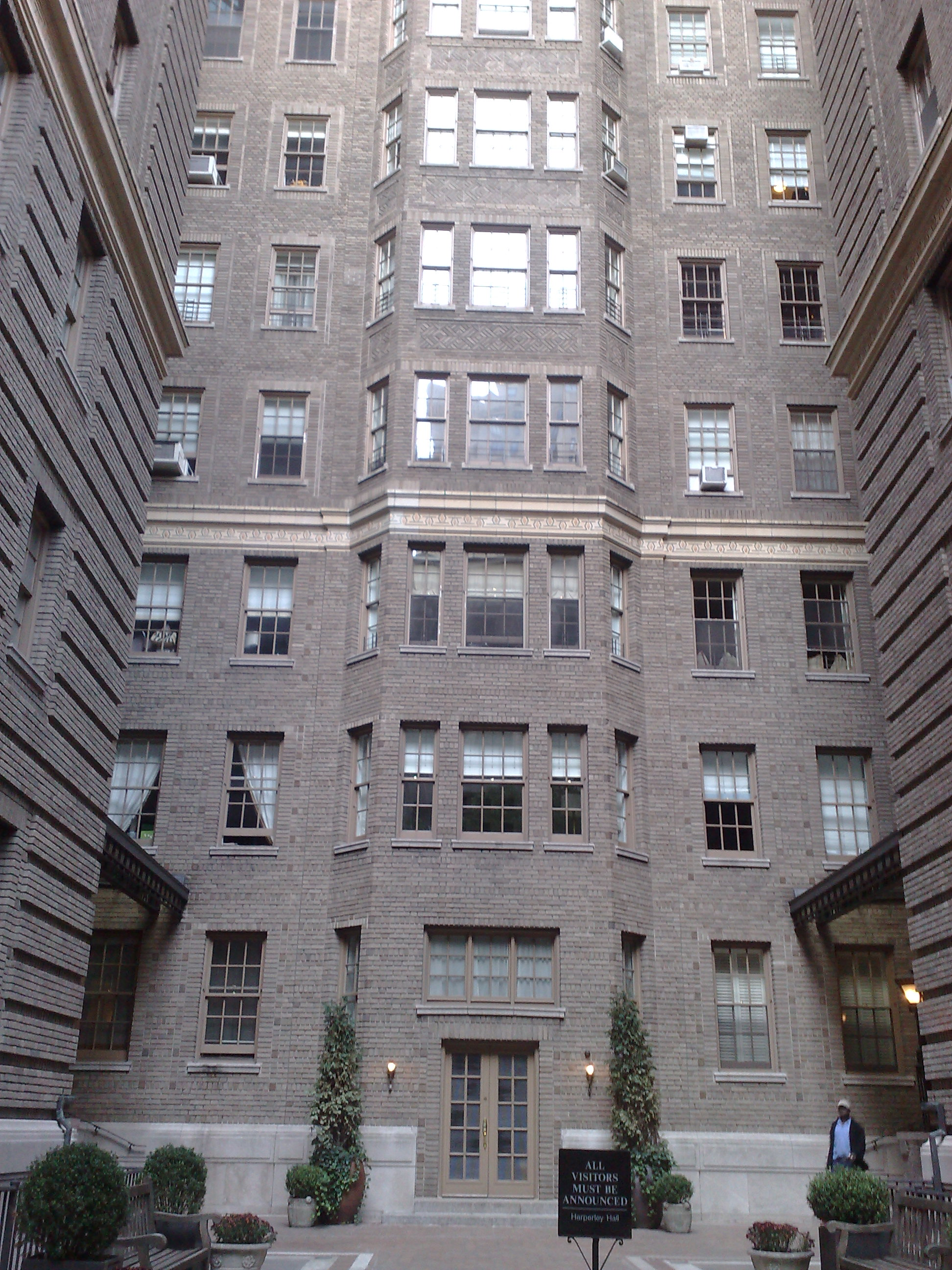
- Harperly Hall

- Location within New York City Location within New York Location within the United States
- Location: Manhattan, New York
- Coordinates: 40°46′17″N 73°58′48″W
- Built: 1910–1911
- Architect: Henry W. Wilkinson
- Architectural style: Neo-Renaissance, Arts and Crafts
- Part of: Central Park West Historic District (ID82001189)
- Added to NRHP: November 9, 1982

Harperly Hall (also known as 41 Central Park West) is an apartment building on the Upper West Side of Manhattan, New York City, United States. The building is located at the intersection of 64th Street and Central Park West and was built from 1910 to 1911. One of the city's few buildings designed in the Arts and Crafts style, Harperly Hall was designed by Henry W. Wilkinson. The structure was listed as a contributing property to the federally designated Central Park West Historic District in 1982 when the district was added to the National Register of Historic Places.

== History ==
Henry Wilhelm Wilkinson, the building's architect, and a group of investors purchased the property at the northwest corner of 64th Street and Central Park West in 1909. The original group included Wilkinson, decorator Mary Bookwalter, artist Dwight Tryon, humorist Wallace Irwin, and concert manager Loudon Charlton. According to filed corporate papers the goal was to build a co-operative "suitable for artists' studios." The building was named after a manor house in County Durham, England, the Wilkinson's ancestral home.

By March 1910 construction on Harperly Hall was nearing completion, the building represented the first housing co-operative in the Central Park West area. The building officially opened in 1911 with 76 apartments.

== Architecture ==
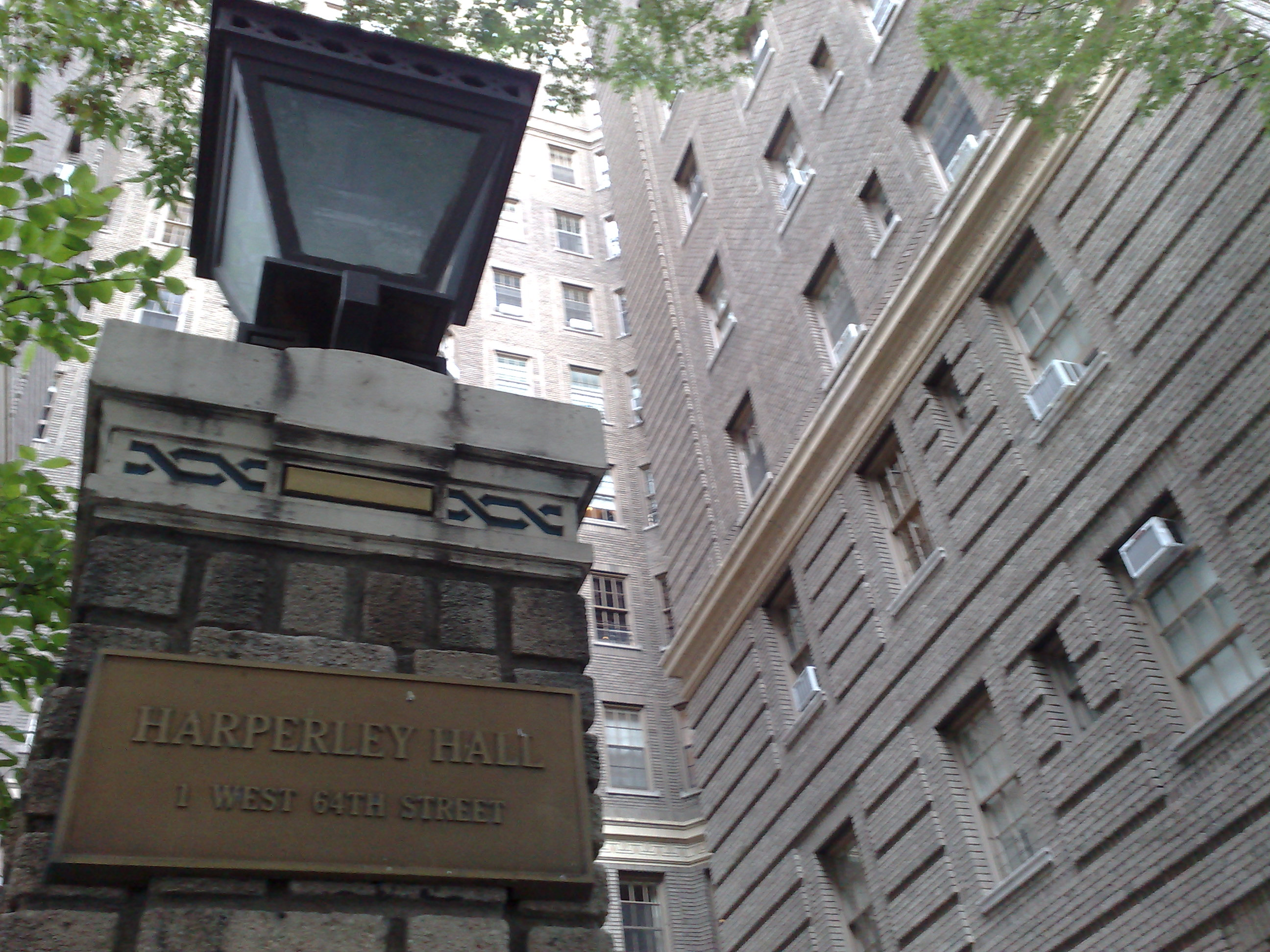
Harperly Hall gate

The building at 41 Central Park West was designed by architect Henry W. Wilkinson. Wilkinson's design is unique from the typical apartment building design of the day. Wilkinson, who had little experience designing apartment-houses, used the Arts and Crafts style liberally, throughout the structure. Though the building is cast mostly in the Arts and Crafts style, a rarity for New York City, it does contain elements of the Neo-Italian Renaissance style.

The facade is brown brick with a limestone base and terra cotta trim. The bricks, rough and mottled, are laid in "undulating lozenges" on the face of the building. This forms a "carpet-like" texture which gives the building a handmade character. Glazed tiles highlight the surface where they provide colorful displays of gold, turquoise and green. The glazed tile work is most likely the work of ceramicist Henry Mercer.

== Notable residents ==
In 1985, singer Madonna and then-husband actor Sean Penn purchased a unit at Harperly Hall. After divorcing from Penn in 1989, she bought two additional units, combining them into a six-bedroom duplex. Madonna's presence at Harperly Hall generated significant publicity for the building, regularly attracting the attention of paparazzi and, according to Scott Durkin, an executive at the Corcoran Group real estate firm, raising the value of other units in the building by 25 percent. In November 2012, Madonna listed the duplex for $23.5 million and sold it for an undisclosed amount several months later.
