= Nathan Korn =

American architect and builder

- Born: 1893
- Died: 22 November 1941 (aged 47–48); Beekman Hospital, New York City, United States
- Education: Cooper Union; Columbia University
- Occupation: Architect
- Spouse: Miriam Weil
- Children: 1

Nathan Korn (1893-1941) was an American architect and builder in New York City.

== Early life ==
He was born in 1893 to Jewish parents, Abraham Korn, a physician and director of the Young Men's Hebrew Association and Julia Rotholz. He was educated at Cooper Union and Columbia University. His father died in 1918.

== Career ==
He was known for reconstructing Russeks department stores in Manhattan, Brooklyn, and Chicago. His firm designed and built residential apartment buildings in Manhattan.

=== Selected works ===
- 944 Fifth Avenue
- The Bolivar, 230 Central Park West
- 327 Central Park West
- 6-16 W 77th Street

== Personal life ==
Korn was married to Miriam Weil, with whom he had a daughter, Judith May.

Korn was involved with Jewish charities. He was a director and house committee member of the United Home for Aged Hebrews.

=== Death ===
Korn died of a heart attack at the age of 48 at the Beekman Hospital. He was survived by his wife, daughter, mother, and a sister, Hortense Meyer.
