= Thomas Tryon (architect) =

American architect

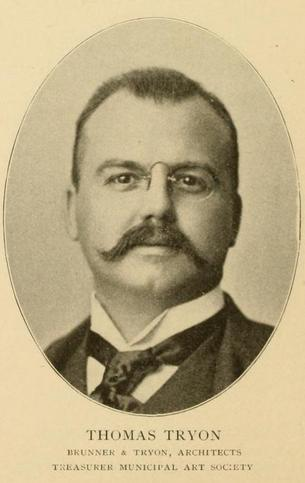
Thomas Tryon

Thomas Tryon (1859 – July 31, 1920) was an American architect who practiced during the late 19th and early 20th centuries. He studied at Massachusetts Institute of Technology and was a member of the New York Architectural League, the American Institute of Architects and a Fellow of the American Institute of Architects. Tryon was once partnered with Arnold W. Brunner as the firm Brunner and Tryon.
