= Eighth Avenue (Manhattan) =

Avenue in Manhattan, New York

- Central Park West (59th–110th Streets); Frederick Douglass Boulevard (north of 110th Street)
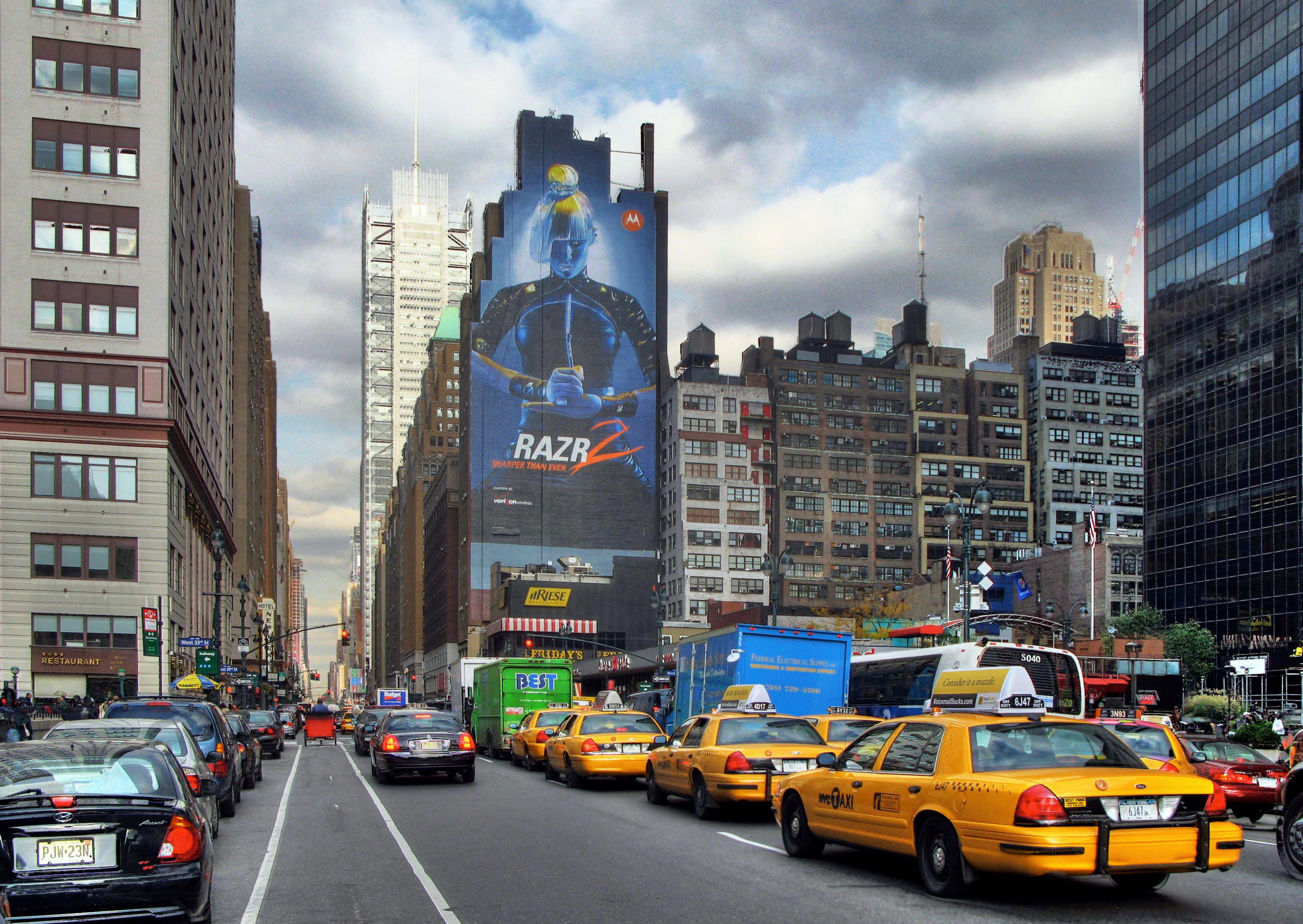
- Facing north on Eighth Avenue from 32nd Street
- Owner: City of New York
- Maintained by: NYCDOT
- Length: 7.8 mi (12.6 km)
- Location: Manhattan, New York City, U.S.
- South end: Hudson / Bleecker Streets in West Village
- Major junctions: Columbus Circle in Midtown; Frederick Douglass Circle in Harlem
- North end: Harlem River Drive in Washington Heights
- East: Greenwich Avenue & 4th Street (below 14th Street); Seventh Avenue (14th–59th Streets); West Drive (59th–110th Streets); Adam Clayton Powell Jr. Boulevard (above 110th Street)
- West: Hudson Street (below 14th Street); Ninth Avenue (14th–59th Streets); Columbus Avenue (59th–100th Streets); Manhattan Avenue (100th–124th Streets); St. Nicholas Avenue (above 124th Street)

Construction
- Commissioned: March 1811

Eighth Avenue is a major north–south avenue on the west side of Manhattan in New York City, carrying northbound traffic below 59th Street. It is one of the original avenues of the Commissioners' Plan of 1811 to run the length of Manhattan, though today the name changes twice: At 59th Street/Columbus Circle, it becomes Central Park West, where it forms the western boundary of Central Park, and north of 110th Street/Frederick Douglass Circle, it is known as Frederick Douglass Boulevard before merging onto Harlem River Drive north of 155th Street.

== Description ==
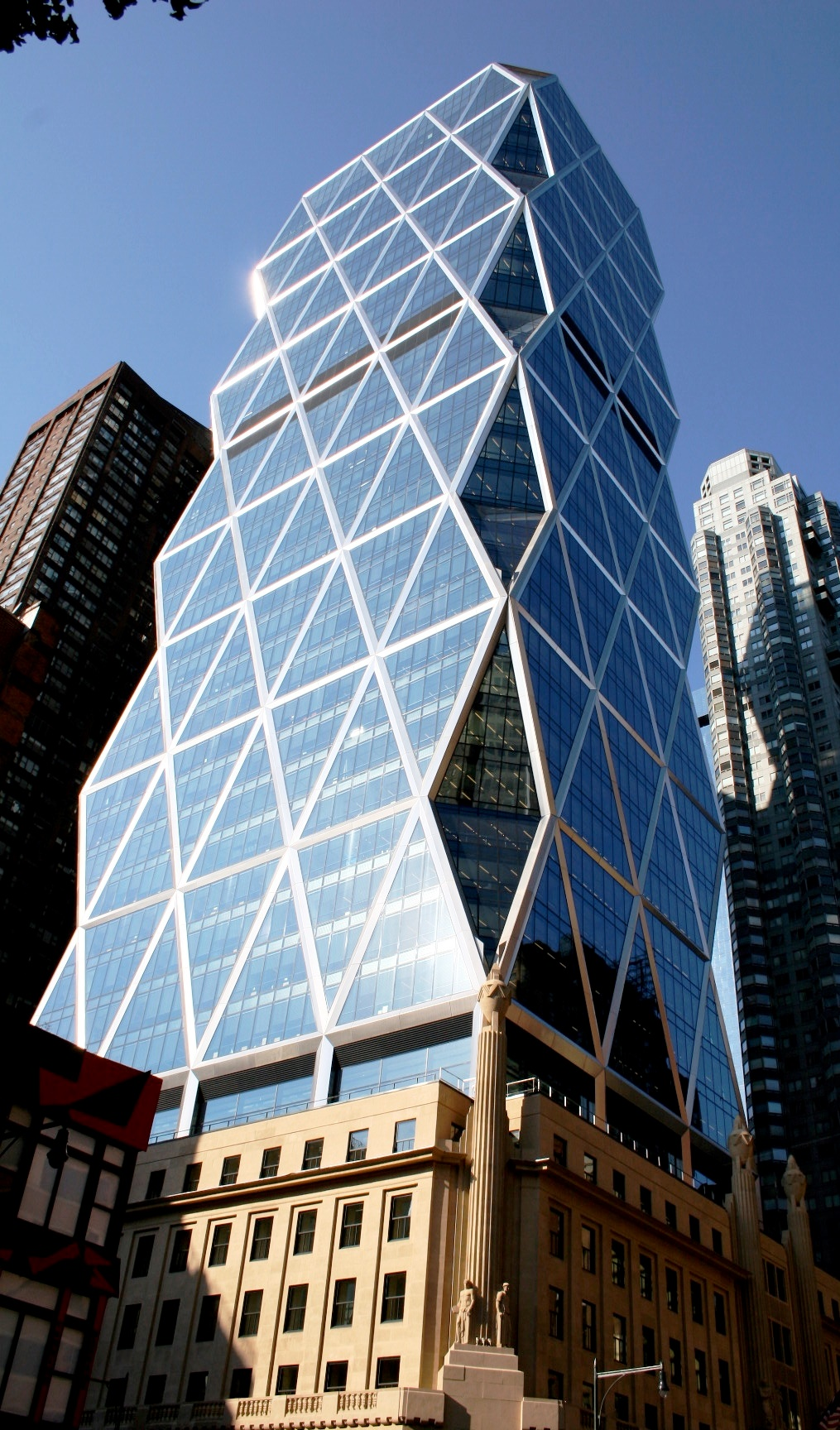
Hearst Tower at West 57th Street and Eighth Avenue

Eighth Avenue begins in the West Village neighborhood at Abingdon Square (where Hudson Street becomes Eighth Avenue at an intersection with Bleecker Street) and runs north for 44 blocks through Chelsea, the Garment District, Hell's Kitchen's east end, Midtown and the Theater District, before it finally enters Columbus Circle at 59th Street and becomes Central Park West. North of Frederick Douglass Circle, it resumes its Eighth Avenue designation, but is also known as Frederick Douglass Boulevard. The avenue ends north of 155th Street, and merges into the Harlem River Drive.

The New York City Subway's IND Eighth Avenue Line, serving the A, C, and E trains in Lower Manhattan and the A, B, C, and D trains on the Upper West Side, runs under Eighth Avenue.

MTA Regional Bus Operations primarily operates the following bus routes on the avenue. All routes are uptown unless specified below:

- The M20 serves Eighth Avenue south of West 66th Street, along with the M104 from West 41st Street to Columbus Circle.
- The M10 serves the length of Eighth Avenue north of West 57th Street in its entirety, running in both directions north of West 63rd Street.
- The M12 and eastbound M14A SBS begin Columbus Circle and FDR Drive service at West 12th and Bleecker Streets, and run south of West 14th Street where they head west and east, respectively.
  - The M12 also runs from West 57th to West 58th Streets before terminating at Broadway.
- The M34A SBS runs from West 34th to West 43rd Streets.
- The M72 runs between West 72nd Street and either West 65th Street (downtown) or West 66th Street (uptown).
- The downtown M96 and M106 run from West 97th to West 96th Streets.

=== Southernmost section ===
The southernmost section is known solely as Eighth Avenue between Abingdon Square and Columbus Circle. This portion of Eighth Avenue has carried traffic one-way northbound since June 6, 1954.

Since the 1990s, the stretch of Eighth Avenue that runs through Greenwich Village and its adjacent Chelsea neighborhood has been a center of the city's gay community, with bars and restaurants catering to gay men. New York City's annual gay pride parade takes place along the Greenwich Village section of Eighth Avenue. Also, along with Times Square, the portion of Eighth Avenue from 42nd Street to 50th Street was an informal red-light district in the late 1960s, 1970s, and 1980s before it was controversially renovated into a more family friendly environment under the first mayoral administration of Rudolph Giuliani.

The Midtown section of Eighth Avenue was frequented by tourists by the 21st century, and the sidewalks in Midtown were widened to accommodate increased crowds. However, that section of the avenue also experienced cleanliness issues, and homeless and mentally ill people were prevalent. In addition, due to the sidewalk-widening projects, parts of Eighth Avenue narrow to two lanes in Midtown.

=== Central Park West ===
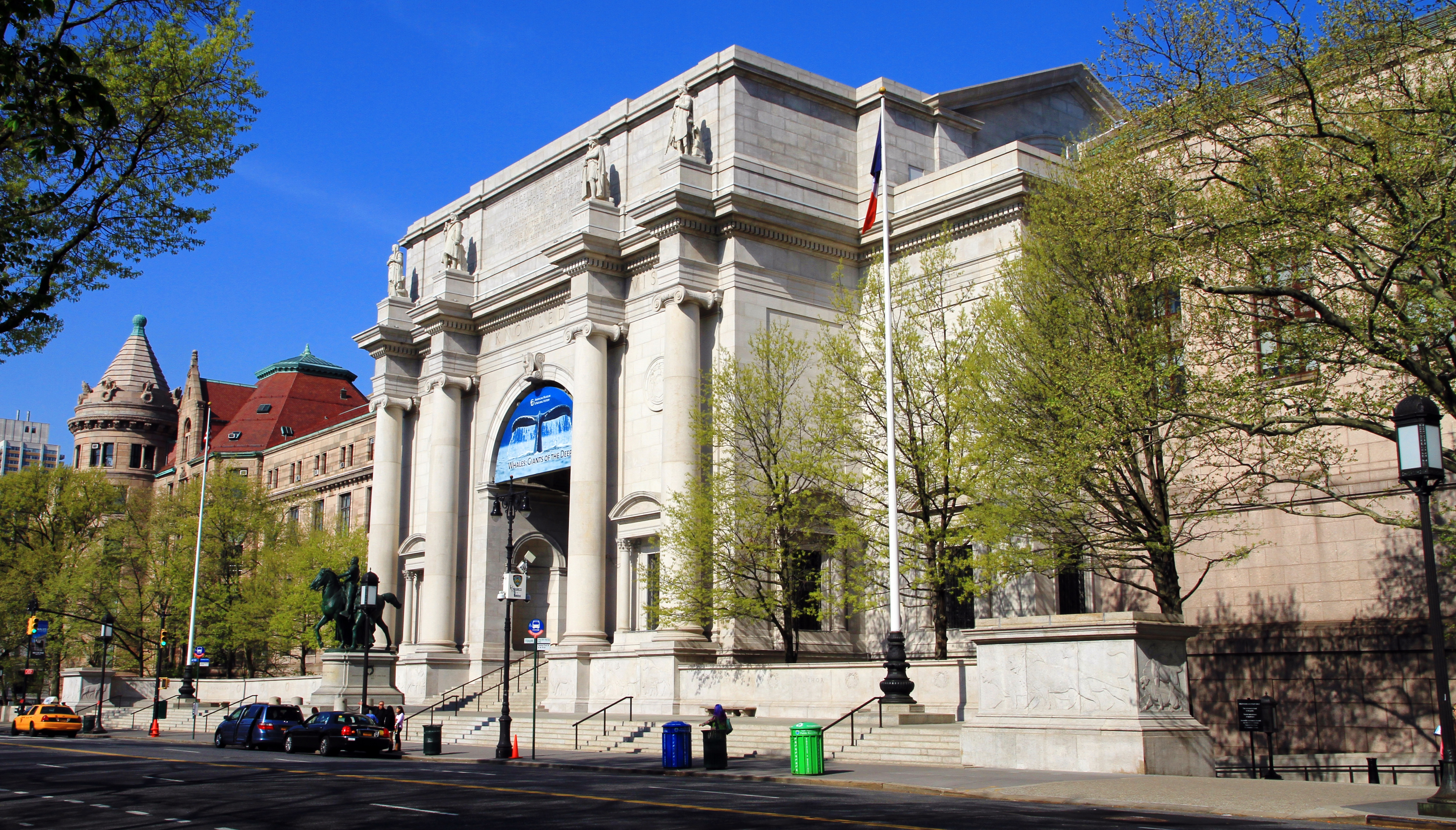
The American Museum of Natural History at 200 Central Park West

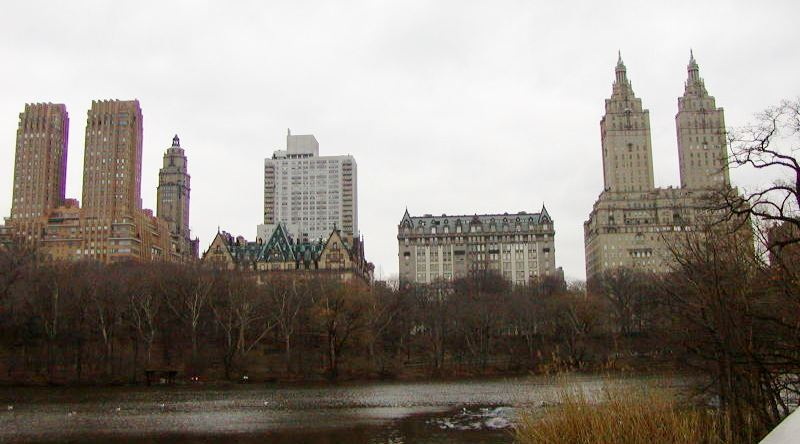
Housing cooperatives on Central Park West: The Majestic (far left), The Dakota (center-left), The Langham (center-right), and The San Remo (far right).

North of Columbus Circle, the roadway becomes Central Park West (abbreviated to CPW). Unlike many Manhattan avenues, CPW has traffic running in two directions, and its address numbering system is different from that of the rest of Eighth Avenue. As its name indicates, CPW forms the western edge of Central Park. It also forms the eastern boundary of the Upper West Side. It runs 51 blocks from Columbus Circle (at 59th Street, or Central Park South) to Frederick Douglass Circle (at 110th Street, or Cathedral Parkway). The gates into Central Park along its western edge are: Merchants Gate at 59th Street, Women's Gate at 72nd, Naturalists Gate at 77th, Hunters Gate at 81st, Mariners Gate at 85th, Gate of All Saints at 96th, Boys Gate at 100th, and Strangers Gate at 106th. Central Park West's expensive housing rivals that of Fifth Avenue on the Upper East Side.

Several notable residences on Central Park West include:

- The Dakota, where John Lennon lived with current resident Yoko Ono, and outside of which he was murdered in 1980
- The San Remo, home to Demi Moore, Diane Keaton, Steve Martin, and U2's Bono
- The El Dorado
- The Beresford, home to Jerry Seinfeld and Diana Ross
- The Langham
- The Orwell House
- The Century
- 15 Central Park West, home to Sting, Alex Rodriguez and Ekaterina Rybolovleva
- 41 Central Park West, home to Madonna
- 455 Central Park West
- The St. Urban
- The Majestic, home to some of the former heads of the Genovese crime family, including Meyer Lansky, Lucky Luciano and Frank Costello. In 1957, Vincent "The Chin" Gigante shot Frank Costello in the lobby of The Majestic in a failed assassination attempt

According to The New York Times's architecture critic Paul Goldberger, the street's buildings, both the new ones like 15 Central Park West and the old ones such as The Century, "fit together the same way the ones in that hypothetical Main Street do, and for the same reason. For more than a hundred years, their architects honor the unspoken agreement to work together, to line their buildings up with each other and to work in a consistent scale with materials that are compatible."

Most of these housing cooperatives were built around 1930, replacing late-19th century hotels with the same names. Some, including The Century, The San Remo, The Majestic, and The El Dorado, are twin towers. Other landmarks and institutions along its length include the New-York Historical Society and the American Museum of Natural History. The area from 61st to 97th Streets is included in the Central Park West Historic District.

The building located at 55 Central Park West is the infamous "Spook Central" from the movie Ghostbusters. The famed New York City restaurant Tavern on the Green is located off Central Park West, at 66th Street, within the grounds of Central Park.

In 1899, while exiting a streetcar, Henry Bliss was run over by a taxi at CPW and West 74th Street, becoming the first person to be run down and killed by a motor car in the Americas.

=== Frederick Douglass Boulevard ===
North of Frederick Douglass Circle at 110th Street in Harlem, it is Frederick Douglass Boulevard, though sometimes still unofficially referred to as Eighth Avenue. The stretch was renamed in 1977. Frederick Douglass Boulevard eventually terminates near the Harlem River at the Harlem River Drive around West 159th Street. While Central Park West has its own address system, address numbers on Frederick Douglass Boulevard continue as if Central Park West had used Eighth Avenue's numbering system.

The corridor along Frederick Douglass Boulevard was rezoned in 2003, allowing for larger residential buildings of greater density, and resulting in the construction of condominiums, rental buildings, restaurants, and cafes. Formerly described as having urban blight, it is now gentrified, especially in the restaurants along its route, giving it the nickname "Restaurant Row". This gentrification is partly due to massive city investment. According to The New York Times the demographic too has changed:

A 2007–2011 census survey estimated that 61 percent of the 57,897 people living along and around Eighth were black, down from 74 percent in 2000. The share of whites jumped to 12.4 percent from 2.3 percent. Median household income rose 28 percent, to $34,694.

== Points of interest ==
- The Fashion Institute of Technology (at 26th/27th Streets)
- Madison Square Garden and Penn Station (between 31st and 33rd Streets)
- James Farley Post Office
- The New York Times Building at 40th Street
- The Port Authority Bus Terminal (between 40th and 42nd Streets)
- One Worldwide Plaza
- Hearst Tower
- Lamartine Hall, former Supreme Grand Orange Lodge of the United States
- Soros Foundation and Open Society Institute headquarters on West 59th Street
- 111 Eighth Avenue, the Art Deco former Inland Freight Terminal of the Port Authority, is the eighth-largest commercial structure in Manhattan, hosting the East Coast headquarters of Google.

== Gallery ==
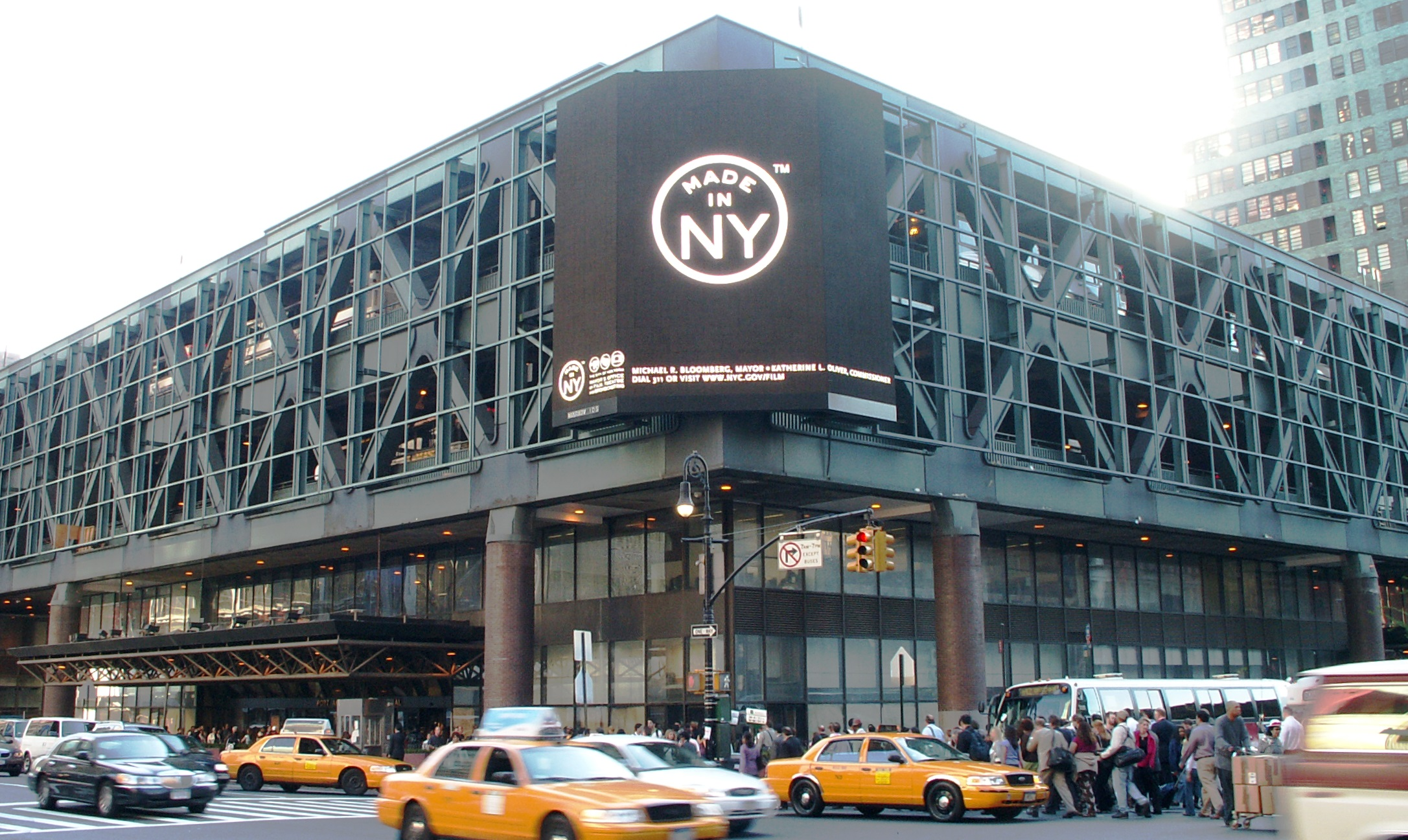
The north building of the Port Authority Bus Terminal at West 42nd Street

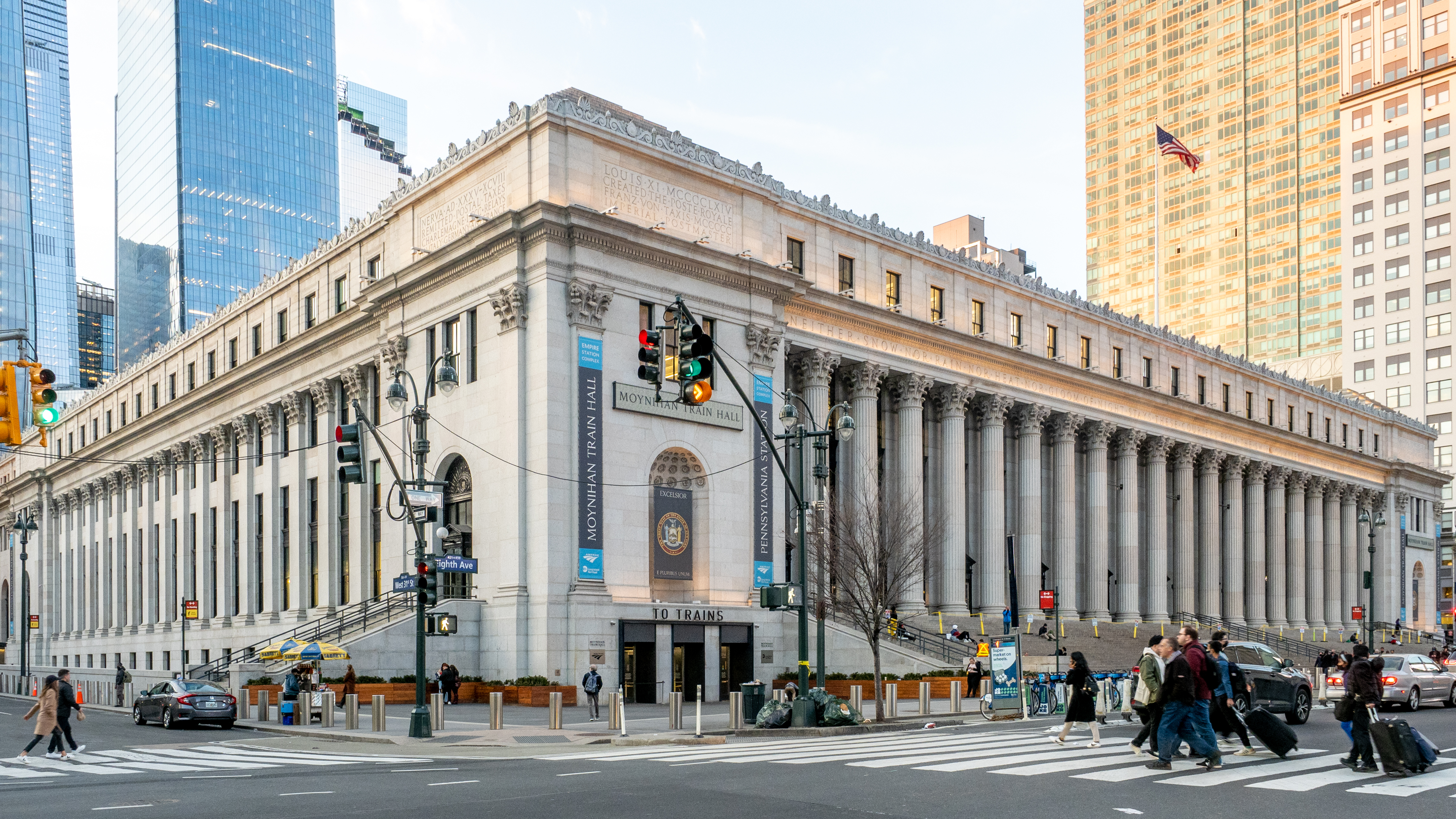
The James A. Farley Building, between West 31st and 33rd Street, the location of Moynihan Train Hall, an expansion of Penn Station

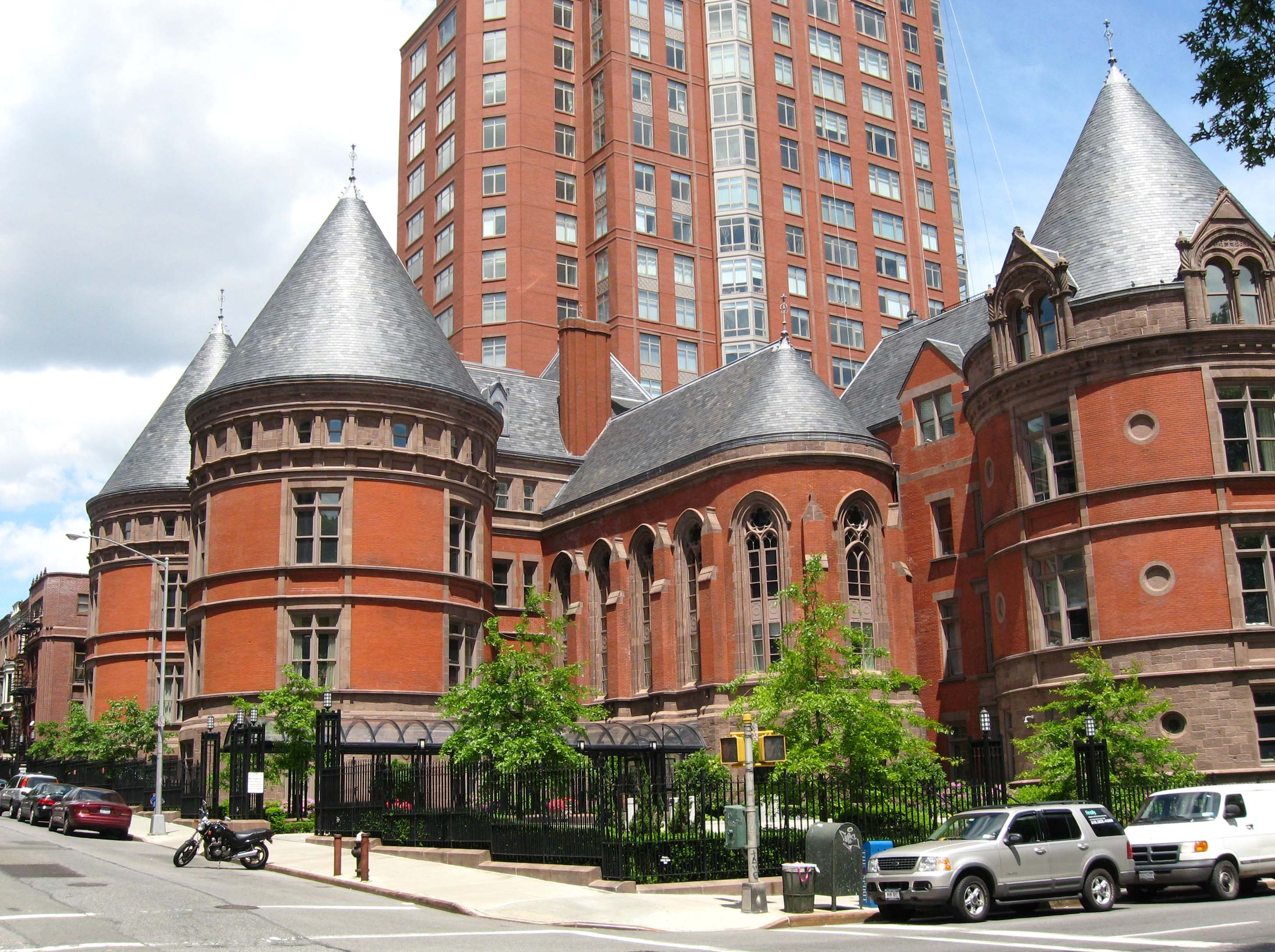
The original New York Cancer Hospital, built between 1884 and 1886, now housing, at 455 Central Park West and 106th Street

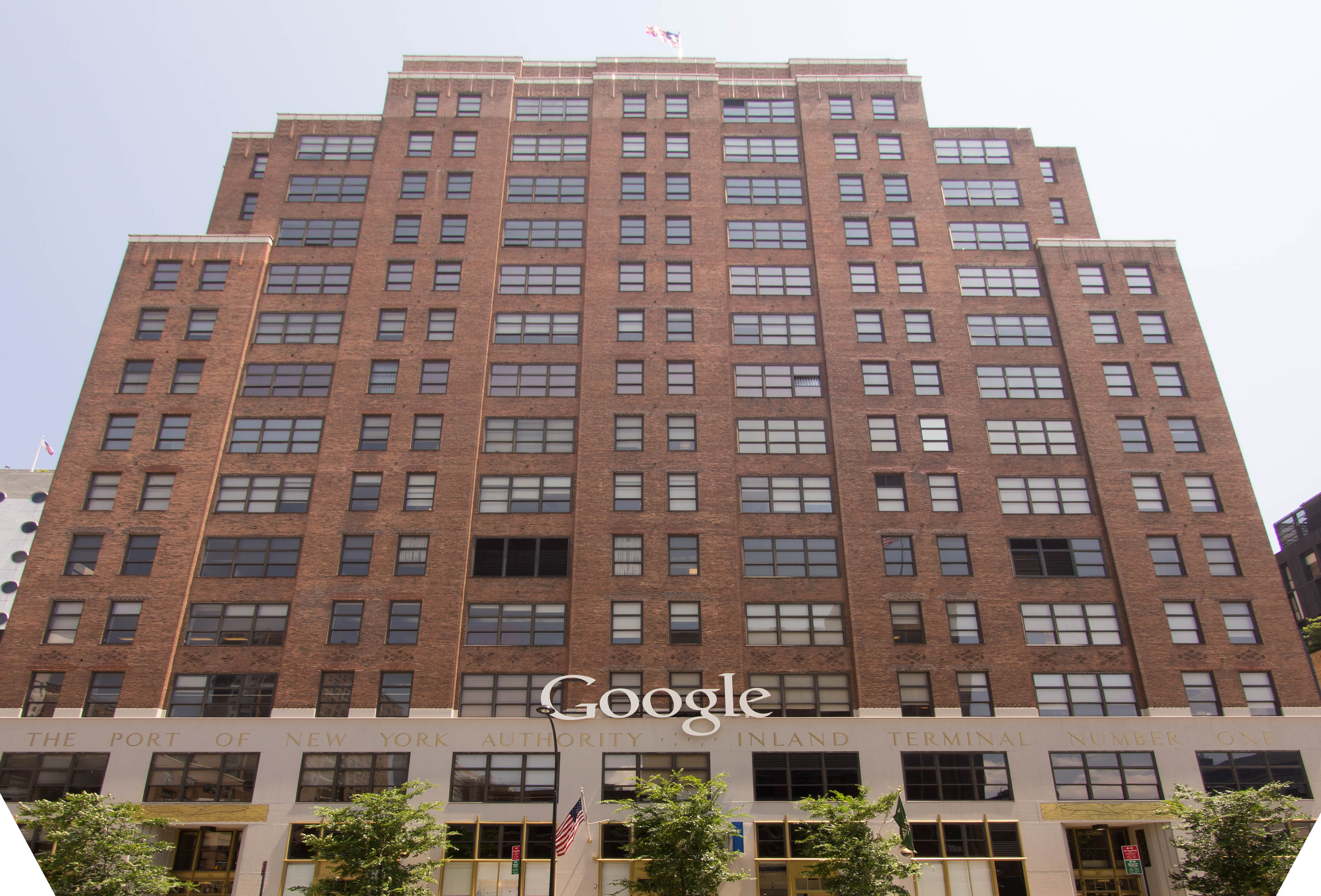
The former Inland Freight Terminal at 111 Eighth Avenue, now home to Google

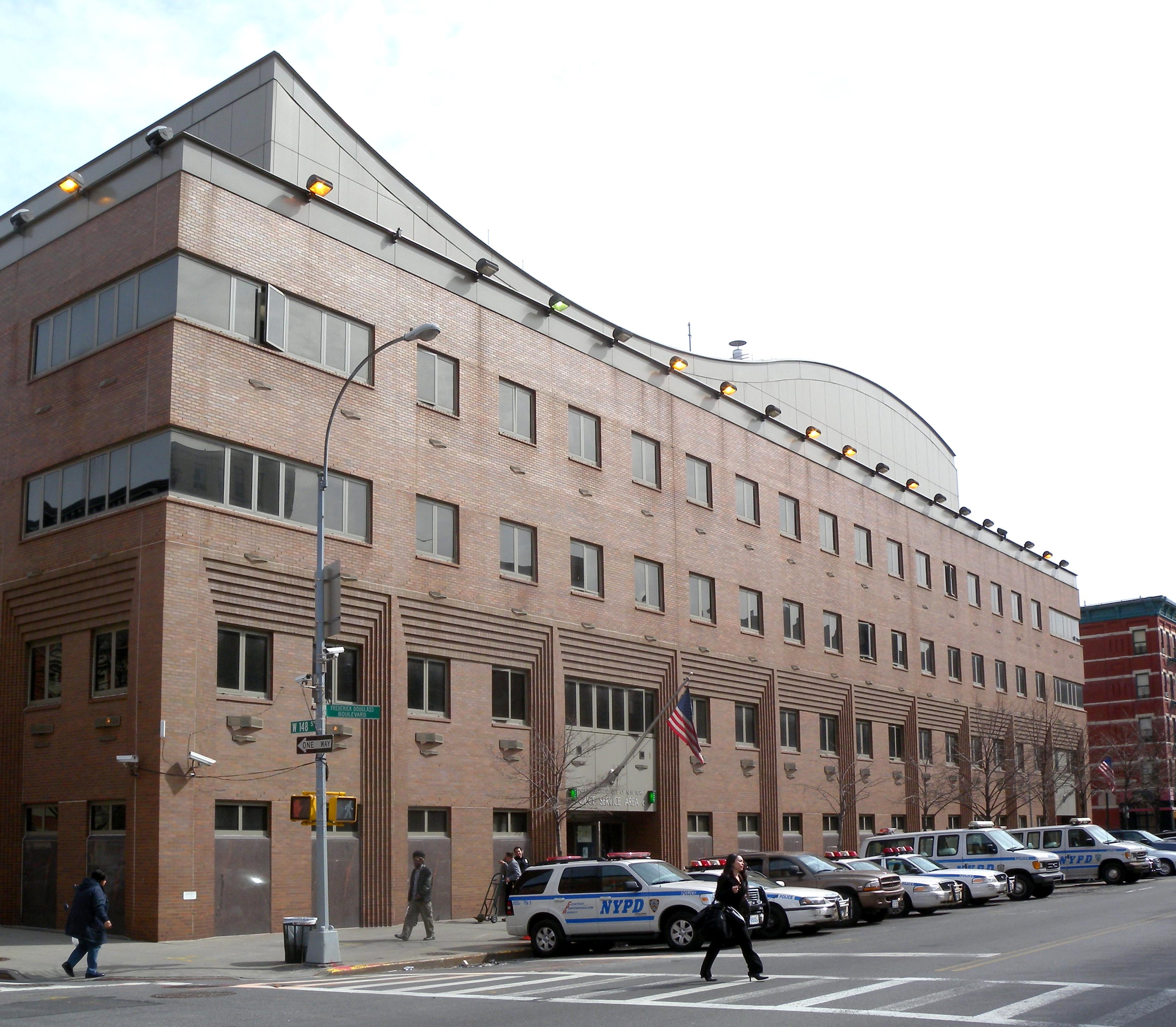
Police station at 148th Street
