= Mary Dyckman =

American activist

Mary Lang Dyckman (1886–1982) was an advocate for labor protections in the policies and laws of New Jersey. Dyckman served as president of the Consumers League of NJ (CLNJ) from 1944 to 1956 and chaired their Child Labor Committee. CLNJ later named their distinguished service award the Mary L. Dyckman Award in recognition of her achievements.

== Early life and education ==
Dyckman was born to Louise (Heroy) Dyckmam and Francis Henry Dyckman, a banker and miller, in Sleepy Eye, Minnesota on August 19, 1886. She was a sister of Heroy Dyckman, Francis Dyckman, and business executive Richard P. Dyckman. Richard Dyckman served as the mayor of Plainfield, New Jersey and as a vice president of L.A. Dreyfus Company, now a subsidiary of the Wrigley Company. Dyckman was also a descent of Dutch farmer William Dyckman, the namesake of Dyckman Street in Manhattan; William Dyckman built the Dyckman House (now the Dyckman Farmhouse Museum), the oldest farmhouse in Manhattan. At the age of four, Dyckman moved with her family to Orange, New Jersey. Her father, Francis, grew up in Orange as the son of William Henry Dyckman and Eliza Mackenzie Dyckman. He founded the State Bank in Sleepy Eye, Minnesota, after moving out West. He also founded the Dyckman Free Library.

In 1905, Dyckman graduated from the Beard School (now Morristown-Beard School) in Orange after taking classes in the Latin-Scientific course of study. (Classmates and friends spelled her name Marie rather than Mary.) Astronomy was her favorite subject at school. Dyckman's father, Francis, wanted her to have diverse, enriching experiences as a child. He brought her to see the conditions of factory workers; this influenced her later interest in occupational health and safety. During high school, Dyckman and her family took a trip to Europe. During their visit to Italy, she began developing an interest in challenges faced by foreign workers.

After high school, Dyckman trained as a visiting caseworker with Boston Associated Charities in Boston, Massachusetts from 1909 to 1911. She then trained as a social worker at the New York School of Social Work (now Columbia University's School of Social Work) in Manhattan. During her studies, Dyckman worked as a visiting caseworker in Orange, New Jersey and the New York City borough of Brooklyn.

== Social work activities ==
Dyckman served as district secretary for the Bureau of Associated Charities in Newark, New Jersey and then as executive secretary of the League for Friendly Service of Bloomfield and Glen Ridge, New Jersey. During her time at the later, she assisted the activities of the committees to address tuberculosis and manage general finances. Dyckman later served as assistant financial secretary for the New York Charity Organization Society, and she chaired the casework committee of the Family Welfare Association of America. In 1930, she helped organize the advocacy activities of a group that sought to sell the municipal light plant in Orange, New Jersey. The group's work led to the passage of a citizen's referendum that sold the plant. Six years later, Dyckman retired from her professional activities as a social worker, and she moved on to volunteer cases.

After receiving election to CLNJ's executive board in 1938, Dyckman chaired an inter-organizational committee to examine concerns with existing child labor laws. The work of this committee led to the passage of New Jersey's Child Labor Act of 1940. This law raised the minimum working age for children to 12 and reduced the number of hours that age-eligible children could work. Additionally, the law prohibited children under age 16 from working during school hours. Dyckman's later recommendations to Governor Walter Edge on protections for migrant workers directly led to the passage of New Jersey's Migrant Law of 1945. This law was the first of its kind in the U.S.

In 1941, Dyckman testified before a Congressional hearing held by the Select Committee Investigating National Defense Migration in the U.S. House of Representatives. The hearing investigated the consequences of inter-state migration caused by the National Defense program.

== Legacy ==
The Special Collections and University Archives at Rutgers University's libraries in New Brunswick, New Jersey houses Dyckman's papers and other works from 1903 to 1982. It includes correspondence from Joseph Califano (from his time as special assistant to President Lyndon Johnson) and Alice Hamilton, president of the National Consumers League. The Newark Public Library in Newark, New Jersey also contains a collection of her works from 1925 to 1984.
