= Bashford Dean =

American zoologist (1867–1928)

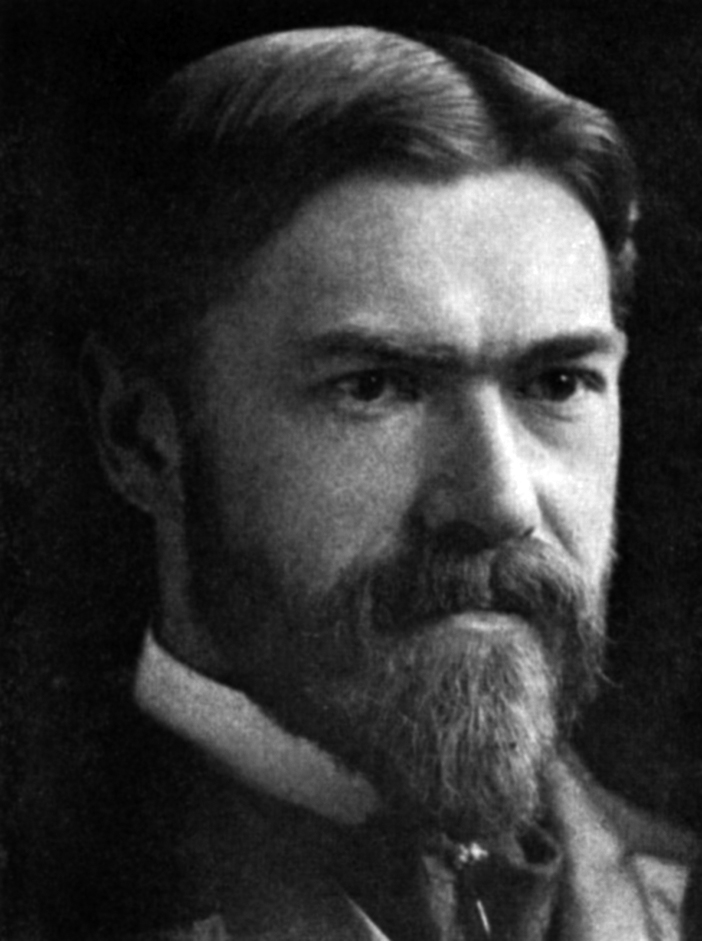
- Bashford Dean
- Born: October 28, 1867; New York City, US
- Died: December 6, 1928 (aged 61); Battle Creek, Michigan, US
- Education: City College of New York; Columbia University (Ph.D.)
- Known for: fossil fishes (sharks, chimaeroids and arthrodires)
- Spouse(s): Mary Alice Dean, née Dyckman
- Awards: Daniel Giraud Elliot Medal from the National Academy of Sciences, 1921.
- Scientific career
- Fields: ichthyology, and medieval and modern armor
- Workplaces: American Museum of Natural History and Metropolitan Museum of Art
- Doctoral advisor: John Strong Newberry

Bashford Dean (October 28, 1867 – December 6, 1928) was an American zoologist, specializing in ichthyology, and at the same time an expert in medieval and modern armor. He is the only person to have held concurrent positions at the American Museum of Natural History and the Metropolitan Museum of Art, where he was Honorary Curator of Arms and Armor; the Metropolitan Museum purchased his collection of arms and armor after his death.

== Early life and education ==
Bashford Dean was born on October 28, 1867 in New York City. His father was a prosperous lawyer from Westchester County. According to his sister Harriet Martine Dean, his interest in armour began at age six, when he "spent hours examining a helmet" while visiting the collection of the estate of the late Carlton Gates in Yonkers (d. 1869), a family acquaintance, whose holdings included Asian and Medieval arms and weaponry. in 1876, aged about nine, he tried to buy the helmet but was outbid. In 1877, at age 10, he purchased two 16th-century daggers from the collection of Henry Cogniat and started his personal collection.

In 1881, he entered the College of the City of New York at only 14 years of age and graduated in 1886; He enrolled in zoology and palaeontology at Columbia University, and received his Ph.D. in 1890.

== Career ==
Dean became an assistant for Professor John Strong Newberry who studied Devonian armored fishes. From the 1880s to the early 1900s, his scientific research allowed him to travel to Europe, Russia, Alaska, Japan, and the Pacific coast of the United States. He became professor of zoology in 1904.

In 1909, Dean published "Studies on fossil fishes (sharks, chimaeroids and arthrodires)", published in Memoirs of the American Museum of Natural History and other articles on the Arthroleptid frog Astylosternus robustus and on the egg capsules of Chimaera.

For his 1916 volume, Bibliography of Fishes, Dean was awarded the Daniel Giraud Elliot Medal from the National Academy of Sciences in 1921.

=== Armor collection and studies ===
As his career in ichthyology progressed, his focus eventually shifted toward the subject of armor and by 1900 he had amassed a private collection of approximately 125 armory specimens. In 1904, Dean initiated the process of establishing the Metropolitan Museum of Art's Department of Arms and Armor, serving first as guest curator while organizing the collection of Duc de Dino, quickly progressing to the position of honorary curator in 1906 and finally to the position of founding curator on October 28, 1912, then working for the Met full-time.

During World War I, Dean was commissioned a Major in the Ordnance Corps, and worked on development of armor, especially of helmets. His work guided and informed helmet development in the US, and possibly in other countries, at least until the 1980s, although his preferred design was rejected in 1918 and c. 1937, as its resemblance to the German Stahlhelm was considered too close. He was the author of Helmets and Body Armor in Modern Warfare. Dean wrote the 1929 published Catalogue of European Court Swords and Hunting Swords: Including the Ellis, De Dino and Reubell Collections.

== Private life, death ==
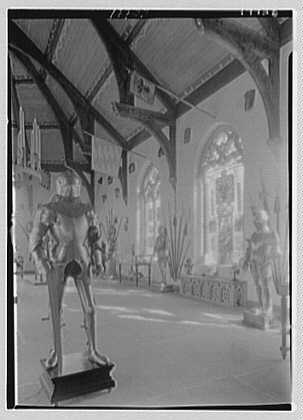
Armor hall, at home in Riverdale

In 1927, Dean retired from the Metropolitan Museum and embarked on the addition of an armor hall to his home at Wave Hill.

Dean was involved in architectural preservation in that he and his brother in law, Alexander M. Welch restored their wives' ancestral home, the Dyckman House.

After undergoing surgery, he unexpectedly died on December 6, 1928, in Battle Creek, Michigan, missing, only the day before his death, the opening of the "Hall of Fishes", his crowning work at the American Museum of Natural History.

== Posthumously ==
Following his death, his friends and family completed construction of the armor hall at his home and installed his private collection there. The Metropolitan Museum later became home to about half of his armor collection of 800 items through an outright bequest and through purchases made possible by gifts by friends and trustees of the museum, which his friend Daniel Chester French commemorated with a plaque.

In 2012, the Metropolitan Museum of Art celebrated the centennial of the founding of its Armory collection, and organized the special exhibition Bashford Dean and the Creation of the Arms and Armor Department.
