= West 73rd–74th Street Historic District =

Historic district in Manhattan, New York

- U.S. National Register of Historic Places
- U.S. Historic district
- New York State Register of Historic Places
- New York City Landmark
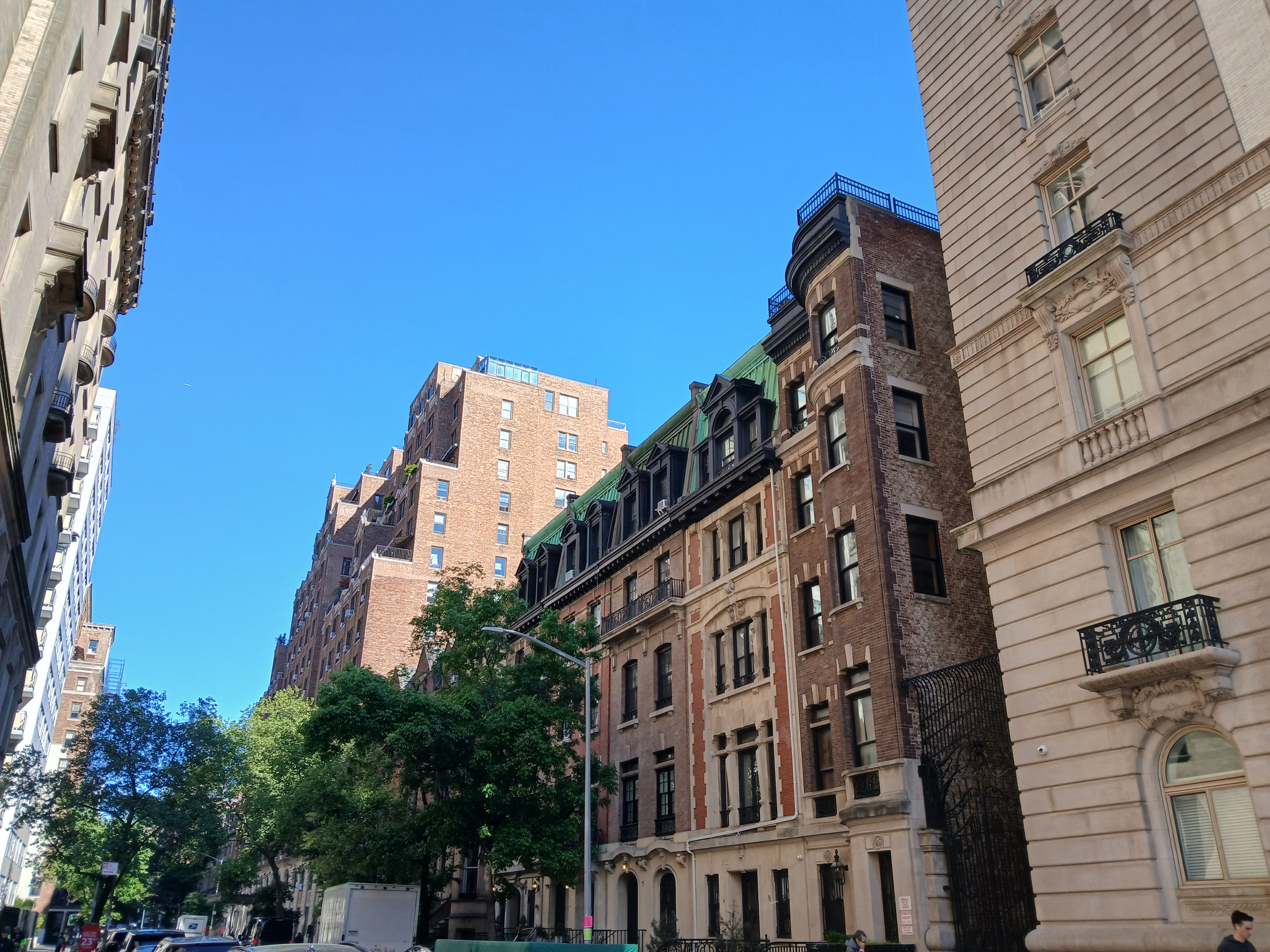

- Location within Manhattan Location within New York City Location within New York Location within the United States
- Location: Block roughly bounded by 73rd Street, 74th Street, Central Park West, and Columbus Avenue; Manhattan, New York, US
- Coordinates: 40°46′40″N 73°58′38″W
- Area: 3 acres (1.2 ha)
- Built: 1882–1907, 1926, 1941
- Architect: Multiple
- Architectural style: Late 19th And 20th Century Revivals, Renaissance, German Renaissance
- NRHP reference No.: 83001752
- NYCL No.: 0964

Significant dates
- Added to NRHP: September 8, 1983
- Designated NYSRHP: August 10, 1983
- Designated NYCL: July 12, 1977

The West 73rd–74th Street Historic District is a historic district on the Upper West Side of Manhattan in New York City, New York, US. The district comprises a series of rowhouses and buildings bounded by 73rd Street, 74th Street, Central Park West, and Columbus Avenue, mostly built between 1885 and 1904. It was listed on the National Register of Historic Places (NRHP) in 1983. The NRHP district overlaps with the Central Park West–West 73rd/74th Street Historic District, designated by the New York City Landmarks Preservation Commission (LPC) in 1977.

The original 28 houses on 73rd Street, built between 1882 and 1885, were designed in the German Renaissance style. Another 18 houses on 74th Street, built between 1902 and 1904, were designed in the Georgian Revival style. Some of the other buildings in the district were built in the mid-20th century; the neo-Gothic-style Park Royal apartment complex was constructed in 1926, and another building at 10 West 74th Street was built in 1941. All of the houses were originally subject to a covenant that restricted their height. The LPC district includes one additional structure, the Langham apartment building, which is part of the neighboring NRHP-listed Central Park West Historic District.

== Description ==
The West 73rd–74th Street Historic District consists of two overlapping historic districts on the Upper West Side of Manhattan in New York City, New York, US. The NRHP district consists of 45 buildings occupying much of a city block (Block 1126 under the Borough, Block and Lot system) bounded by Central Park West to the east, 73rd Street to the south, Columbus Avenue to the west, and 74th Street to the north. The city district includes all of these buildings, plus an adjacent property on Central Park West (The Langham at 135 Central Park West), the latter of which is part of another NRHP district, the Central Park West Historic District. The entire district is also overlaid by a second city district, the Upper West Side/Central Park West Historic District. The houses are designed in the Beaux-Arts, Georgian Revival, and German Renaissance styles. Multiple architects, including Henry J. Hardenbergh and Percy Griffin, designed the district's houses. Clinton & Russell designed the Langham.

Developers and architects
Address / Name	Location	Completed	Developer	Architect
3–11 West 73rd Street	North side of 73rd Street	1903	William W. and Thomas M. Hall	Welch, Smith & Provot
15A–19, 41–67 West 73rd Street (Note: Plus the demolished houses at 21–39 West 73rd Street. 15A West 73rd Street formerly had address number 13 West 73rd Street, while 67 West 73rd Street also has address number 281 Columbus Avenue.)	North side of 73rd Street	1884–1885	Edward Cabot Clark	Henry Janeway Hardenbergh
21–39 West 73rd Street / Park Royal	North side of 73rd Street	1926	23 West 73rd Street Corporation	George F. Pelham
6 West 74th Street (Note: Plus the demolished house at 8 West 73rd Street)	South side of 74th Street	1904	William W. and Thomas M. Hall	Welch, Smith & Provot
8–14 West 74th Street / 10 West 74th Street	South side of 74th Street	1941	10 West 74th Street	H. Herbert Lilien
16 West 74th Street (Note: Plus the demolished houses at 10–14 West 73rd Street)	South side of 74th Street	1891	Cornelius W. Luyster	John H. Duncan
18–52 West 74th Street	South side of 74th Street	1902	F. Ambrose Clark	Percy Griffin
289–295 Columbus Avenue / Art Studio Building	Southeast corner of 74th Street and Columbus Avenue	1903	F. Ambrose Clark	George Henry Griebel
The Langham	West side of Central Park West	1907	Abraham Boehm and Lewis Coon	Clinton & Russell

=== 73rd Street ===
==== Eastern houses and Park Royal ====
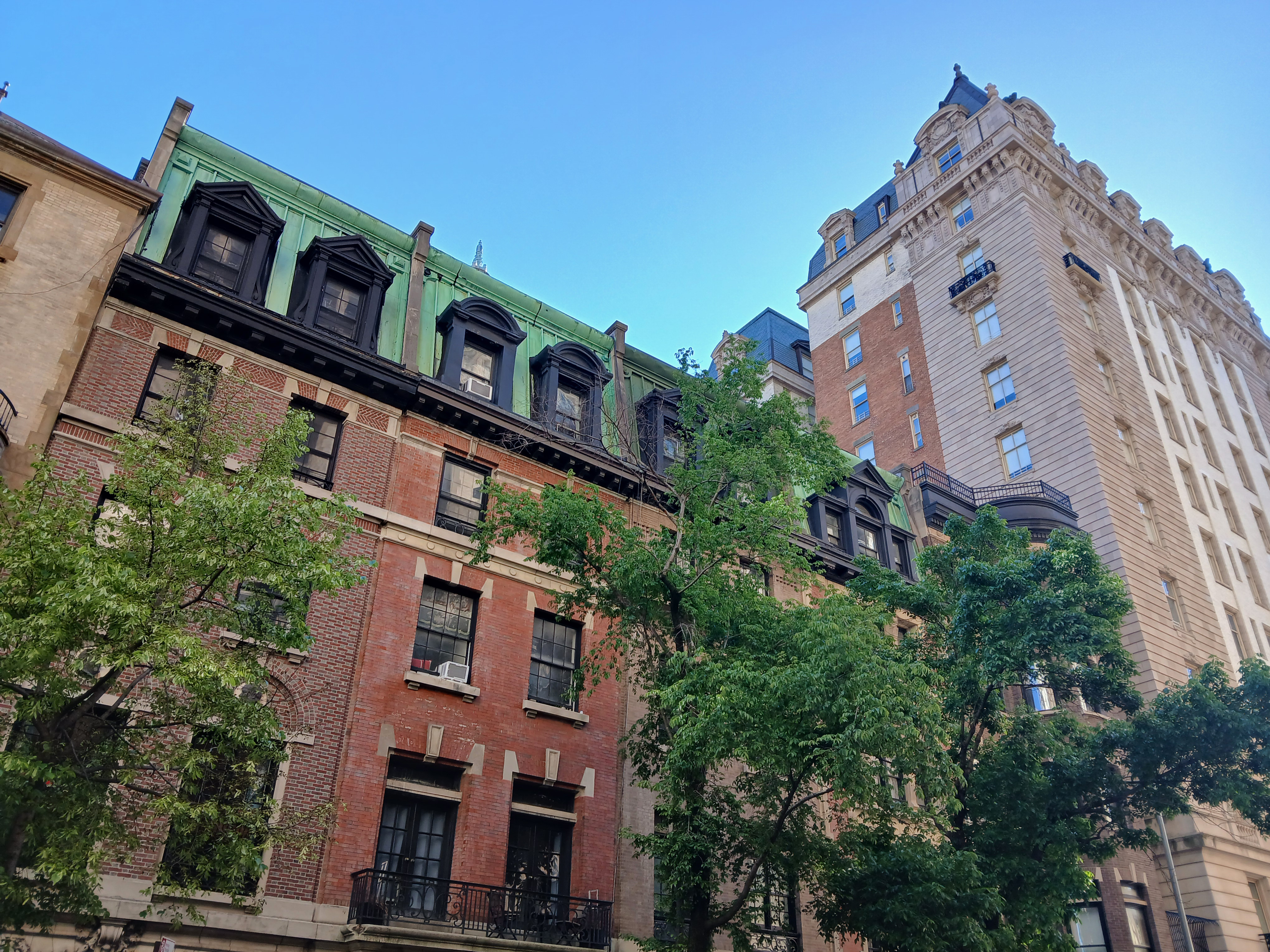
The houses at 3–11 West 73rd Street, with the Langham at right

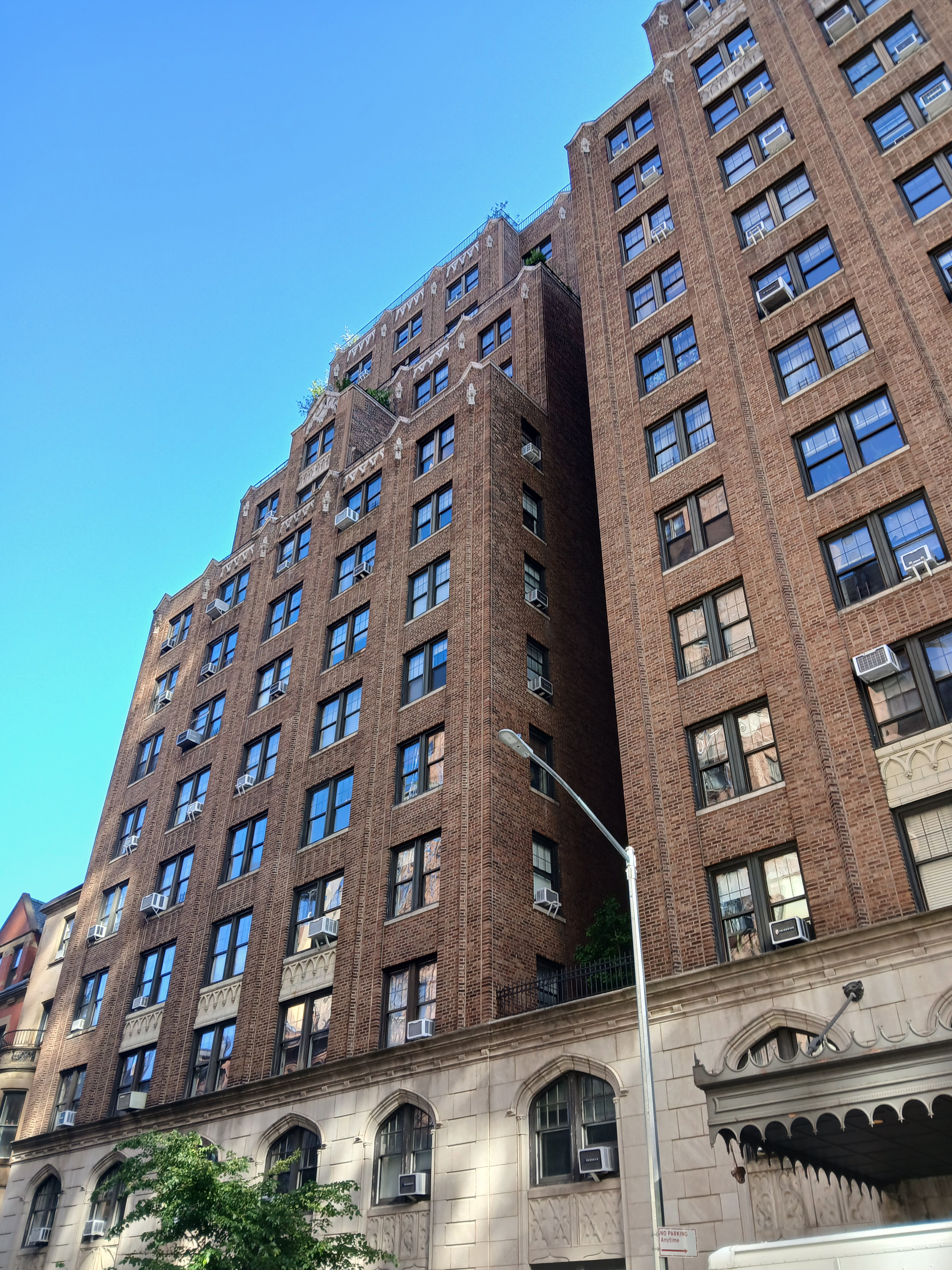
The Park Royal

The houses at 3–11 West 73rd Street, at the eastern end of the block, were designed by Welch, Smith & Provot. These buildings are all five stories tall, with Beaux-Arts details at their ground-level English basements, along with more classical details on their upper stories. The ground levels are clad in limestone and have railings surrounding recessed areaways. The upper stories of each house are level with each other and are decorated with brickwork. There are different decorations on each of the five houses. For example, number 3 uses brown brick instead of red; number 5 has central tripartite windows; and numbers 7, 9, and 11 have ground-level arches and a variety of upper-story motifs. Due to the terms of the site's restrictive covenant, the easternmost section of 3 West 73rd Street had to be set back a shallower distance from the rest of the facade; as a result, that building contains a curved bay.

At 21–39 West 73rd Street is the Park Royal, which was developed in 1926 and designed by George F. Pelham in the Gothic Revival style. The building is 15 stories high. The Park Royal's lowest two stories are clad in limestone and granite. The upper stories are clad in brick and have light courts, giving the floor plan an E shape. There are vertical brick buttresses, horizontal spandrel panels, and Gothic tracery on the upper levels, along with terracotta-trimmed setbacks.

==== Midblock and western houses ====
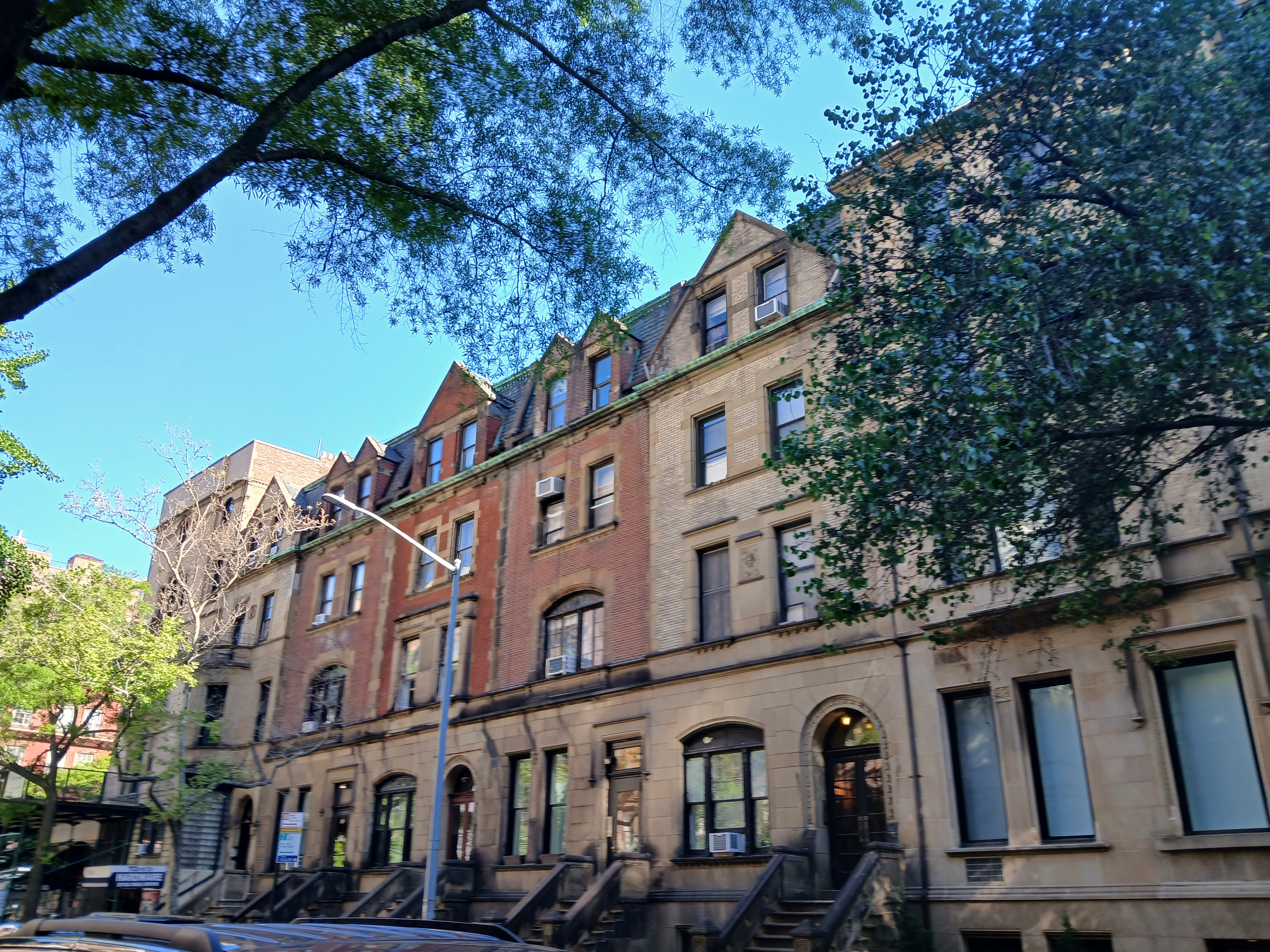
The westernmost houses on West 73rd Street

There were originally 28 buildings at 13–67 West 73rd Street, designed by Hardenbergh, extending from midblock toward the rest of the block. The Park Royal replaces ten of these houses. Built starting in 1882, the townhouses are variously described as being designed in the German Renaissance, medieval, or early Renaissance styles. The outermost private residences—number 15A (formerly number 13) and number 65—and the center residences at numbers 37–41 were also given distinctive treatments. The houses were built in two phases; the houses in the eastern phase, at 13–27 West 73rd Street, are slightly wider and older than those at 29–67 West 73rd Street.

The houses all have raised basements and four above-ground stories, although they all have distinct designs due to the mixing and matching of multiple elements; only six of the houses is stylistically paired with another. The houses are clad in sandstone up to the top of the first floor, where a stone band course runs horizontally across each facade. The houses are all built with stoops, many of which remain intact, and have arched or square-headed doorways. Except for the outermost and center houses, the houses mostly have red-brick facades and either of two types of mansard roof. Houses 15A, 37–41, and 65 were built with buff brick facades and quoins; all of these except number 39 had hip roofs, and number 65 and 15A have protruding bays. The fenestration, or window arrangement, varies from building to building. A combination of narrow windows or wider segmental arches is used on the first and second floors, while the third story generally contains two windows (which in some cases are separated by panels).

The westernmost building in the row, 67 West 73rd Street (a.k.a. 281 Columbus Avenue) at the northwest corner of 73rd and Columbus, was built as an apartment structure but shares some similarities with the houses in the row. It is clad with buff brick. The southern section of the building (facing 73rd Street) was originally topped by a hip roof and is higher than the northern section, with a protruding three-story bay. There is an entrance facing 73rd Street, and a combination of small windows, large tripartite windows, and bull's-eye windows on the upper stories.

=== 74th Street ===
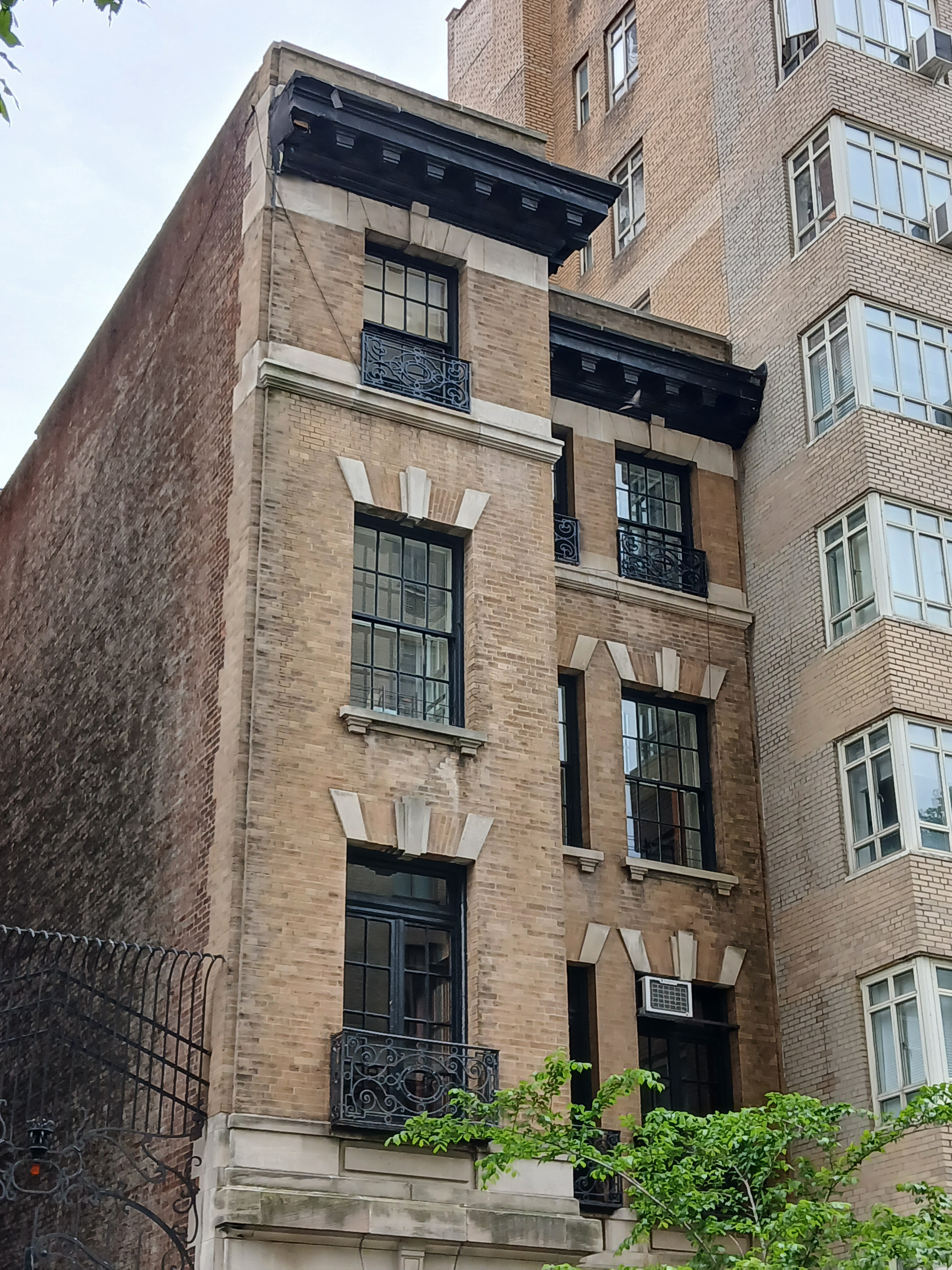
6 West 74th Street

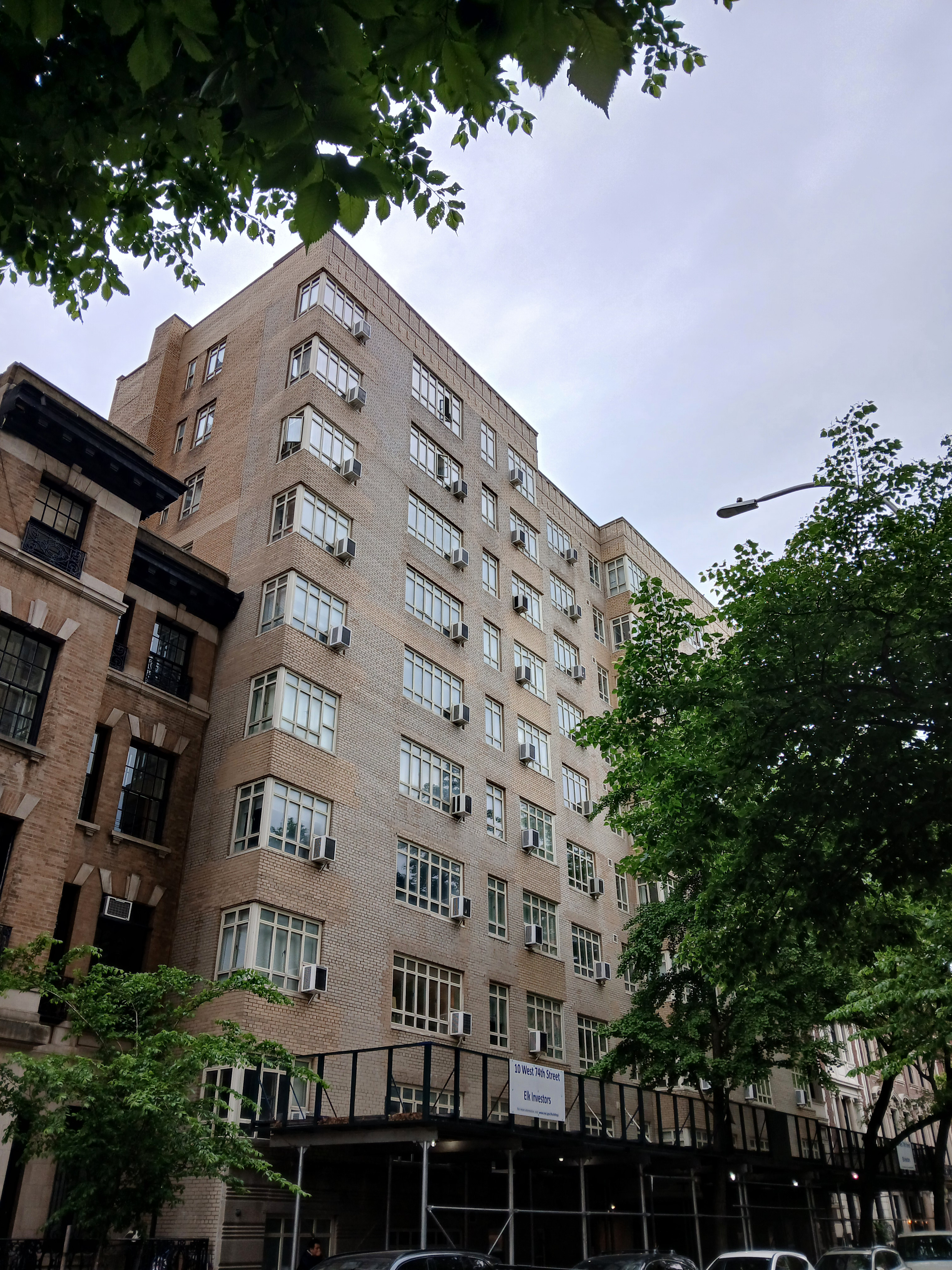
10 West 74th Street

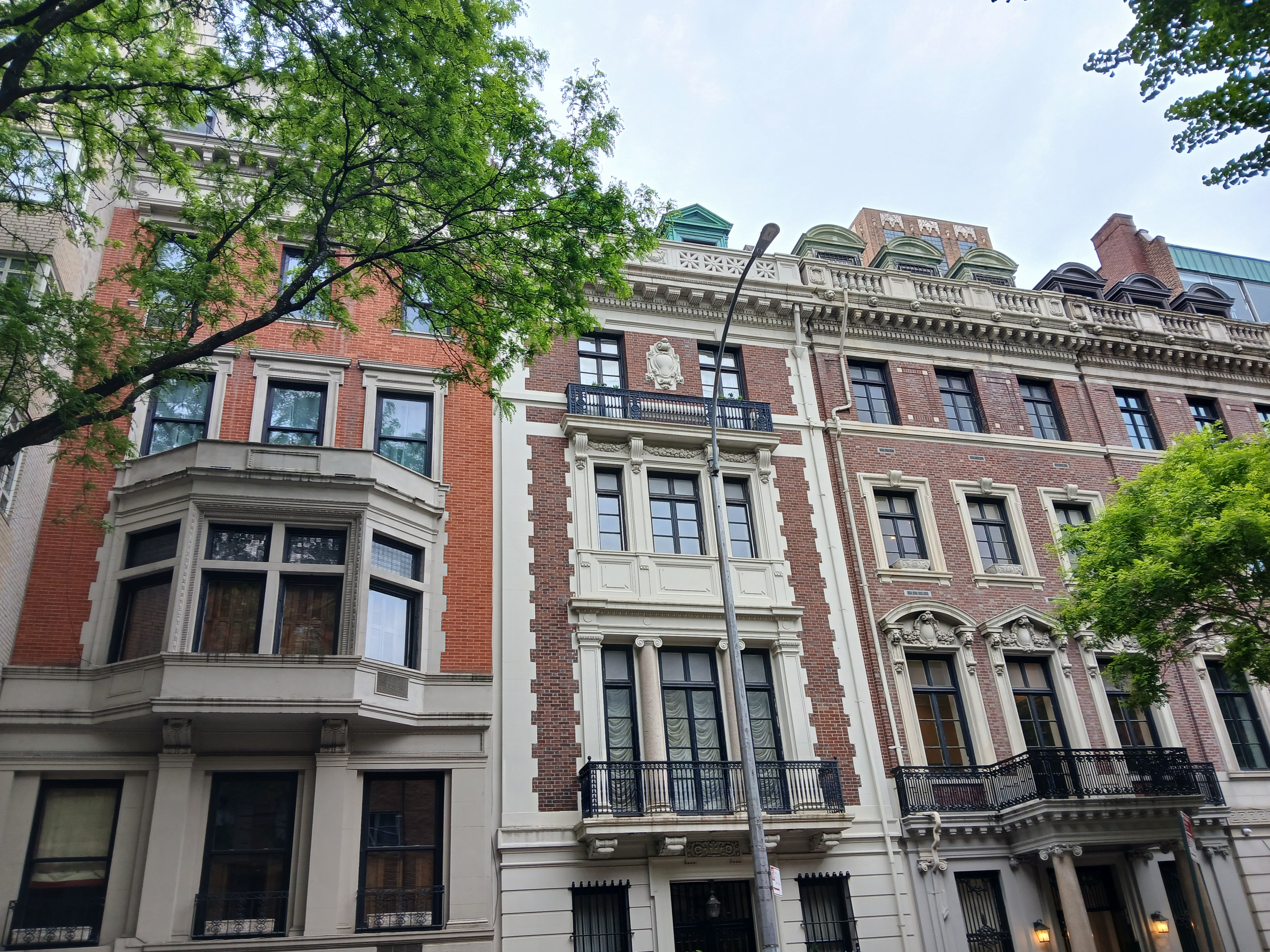
16 West 74th Street (left) and 18–22 West 74th Street (center to right)

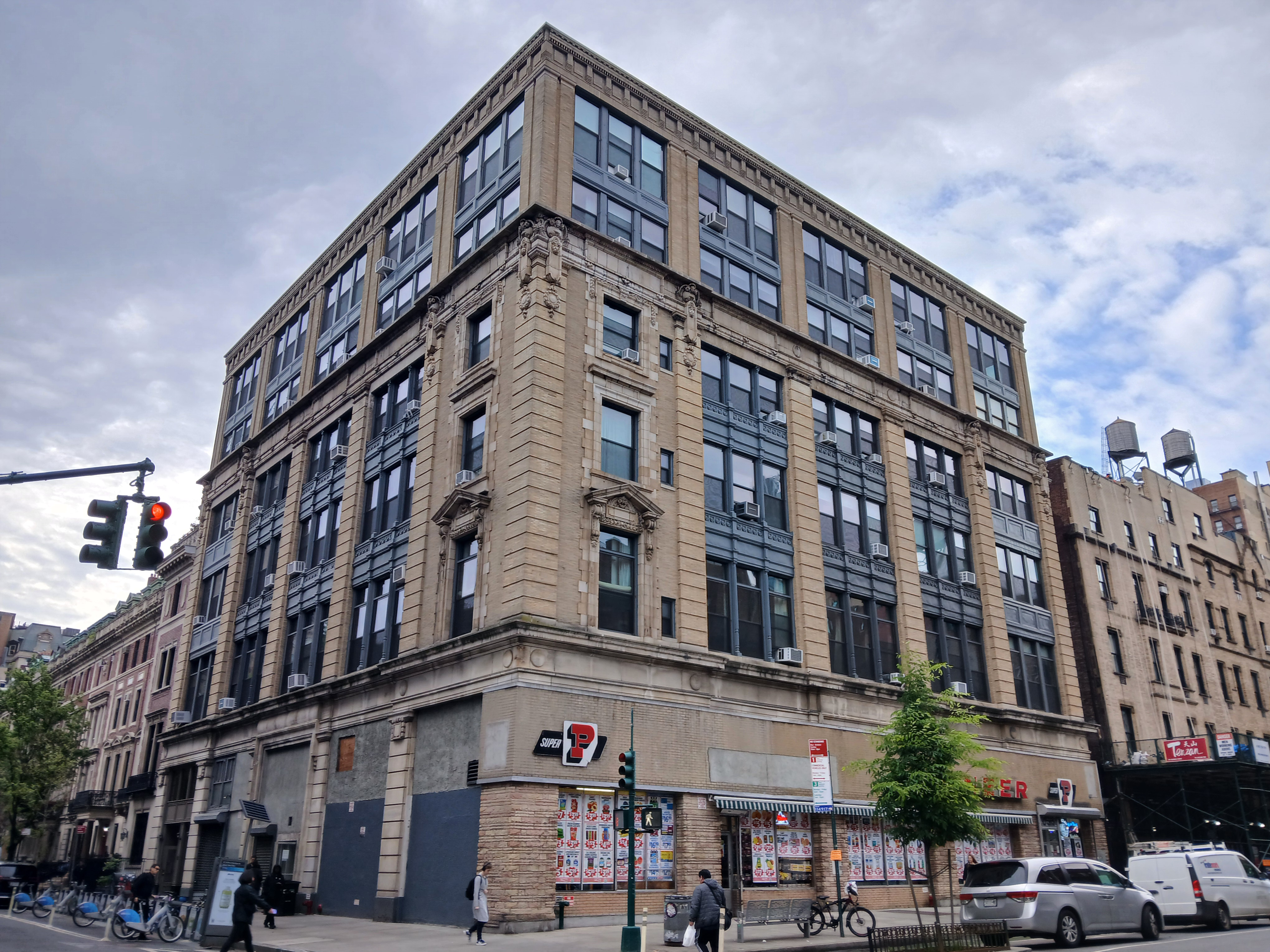
289–295 Columbus Avenue

6 West 74th Street, the lone survivor of a pair at numbers 6–8, was designed by Welch, Smith & Provot and is clad in yellow brick. It is stylistically similar to the firm's earlier work at 3 West 73rd Street, and is subject to a similar setback restriction; the eastern section has a protruding entrance bay. Number 6 has ashlar limestone ground-level cladding, decorative lintels, second-floor French windows with balconies, horizontal band courses. Slightly farther west is 16 West 74th Street, the lone survivor of four at numbers 10–16 designed by John Hemenway Duncan. The brick structure originally stood four stories high, with decorations such as first-story pilasters, a second-story oriel window with dentils, third-story windows with eared frames, and fourth-story windows with lintels and modillions. Atop the building is a frieze and a more modernistic fifth story. Between numbers 6 and 16 is the 10 West 74th Street apartment building, which replaced four rowhouses there. Designed in the Art Deco style by H. Herbert Lilien, it rises ten stories and has decorations such as striated stone, wrap-around windows, a recessed facade, and setbacks.

There are 18 houses at 18–52 West 74th Street. Built between 1902 and 1904, the townhouses were designed by Griffin in the Georgian Revival style, with a variety of ornamentation. The houses each occupy lots of about 25 by 85 feet (7.6 by 25.9 m) across. Each house rises five stories, its attic being recessed. They are mostly set back a similar distance from the street, with areaways in front. The exception is number 52 (the westernmost house), which is L-shaped because of a protruding western portion; this is due to a restrictive covenant, which allowed the western portion of number 52 to be recessed a smaller distance from the other houses. The house designs are of two general types: a first type with a single, wide window on the second and third stories, and a second type with three windows on these stories (and optionally a portico at the entrance). The first and second types of facade designs alternate with each other and generally share similar features, such as stone cornices and protruding dormer windows. Each house was split into 17 to 19 rooms; the interiors had marble-and-wrought-iron vestibules, wood-paneled rooms, and large kitchens.

The building at 289–295 Columbus Avenue (the Art Studio Building), at the southwest corner with 74th Street, was designed by George Henry Griebel as a six-story storage structure; it has since been converted into apartments. It has a brick and limestone facade. 289–295 Columbus Avenue is divided into three horizontal layers. The first story is higher than the others and has rusticated limestone piers decorated with medallions and garlands. The second through fourth stories retain these rusticated piers, with tripartite windows between them. The fifth and sixth stories, set off by a terracotta cornice above the fourth story, have pilasters and a brick cornice.

=== Central Park West ===
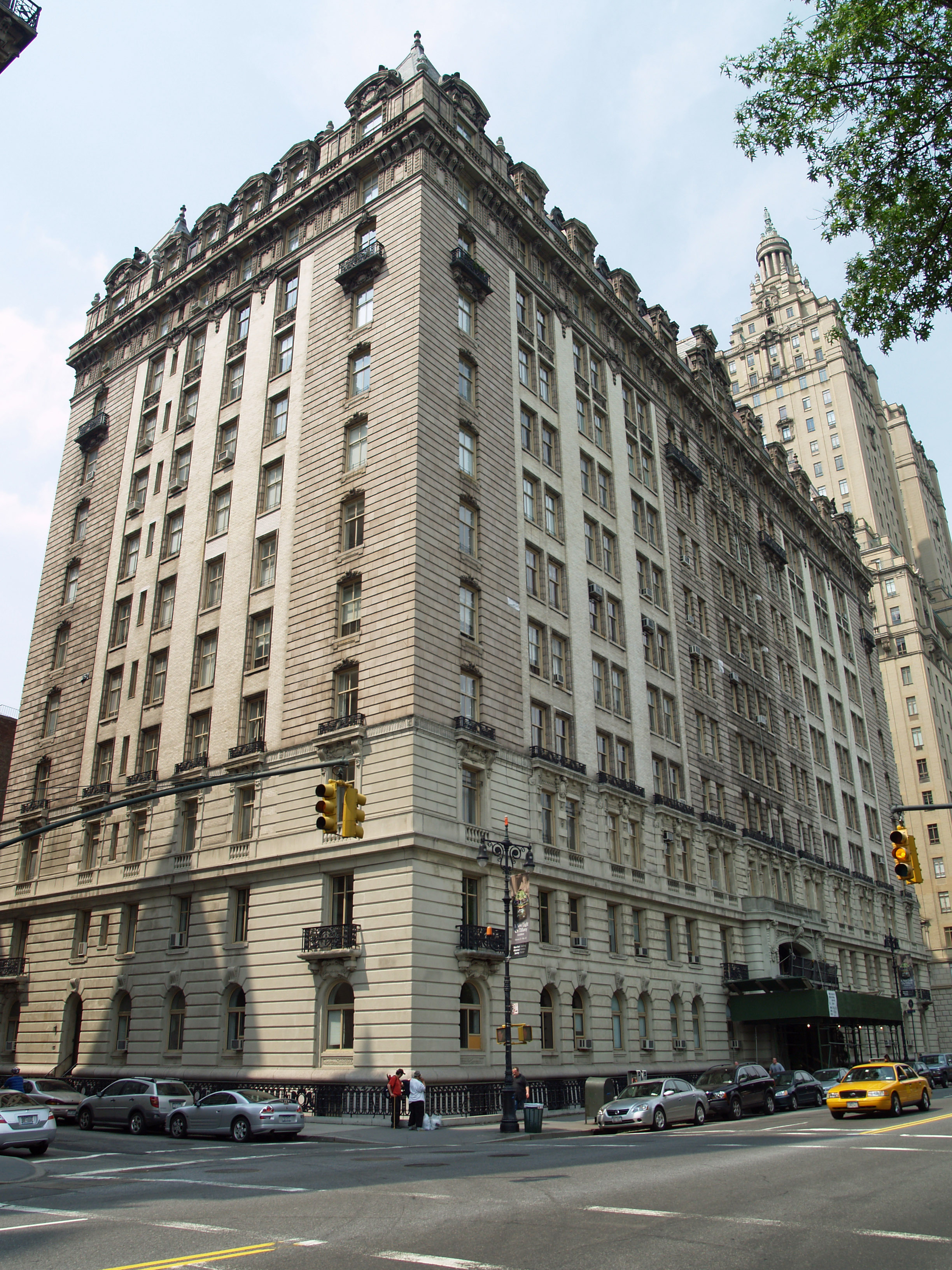
The Langham

The Langham, occupying the entire western side of Central Park West between 73rd and 74th streets, was designed by architects Clinton & Russell. It is variously cited as being in the Beaux-Arts or French Second Empire style. The lowest two stories are clad in rusticated blocks of limestone, and there is an ornate segmental arch and a glass-and-iron canopy at the Central Park West entrance. The third floor has brick-and-limestone panels and stone balustrades, while the fourth story has iron balconies. The fourth through eleventh floors have limited ornamentation, divided into seven sections clad in either terracotta, limestone, or brick. There are decorative terracotta windows beneath the cornice. The mansard roof has terracotta dormers and four smaller hip roofs. The Langham has U-shaped floors surrounding interior light courts. Each floor originally had four apartments, which were later subdivided further.

== History ==
Before European colonization of modern-day New York City, the site was inhabited by the Lenape people. After the British established the Province of New York, the area became part of the "Thousand Acre Tract", owned by several English and Dutch settlers, in 1667. The tract was later subdivided; by 1745, the area had become part of the farm of Teunis Somarindyck (also spelled Somerindyke), running between 73rd and 77th streets. The land was further subdivided and resold in the 19th century. The construction of Central Park in the 1860s spurred construction on the Upper East Side of Manhattan, but similar development on the Upper West Side was slower to come. This was in part because of the West Side's steep topography and its dearth of attractions compared with the East Side. Major developments on the West Side were erected after the Ninth Avenue elevated line opened in 1879, providing direct access to Lower Manhattan, and after the American Museum of Natural History and the Dakota apartment building were constructed nearby in the 1870s and 1880s.

=== Initial development ===
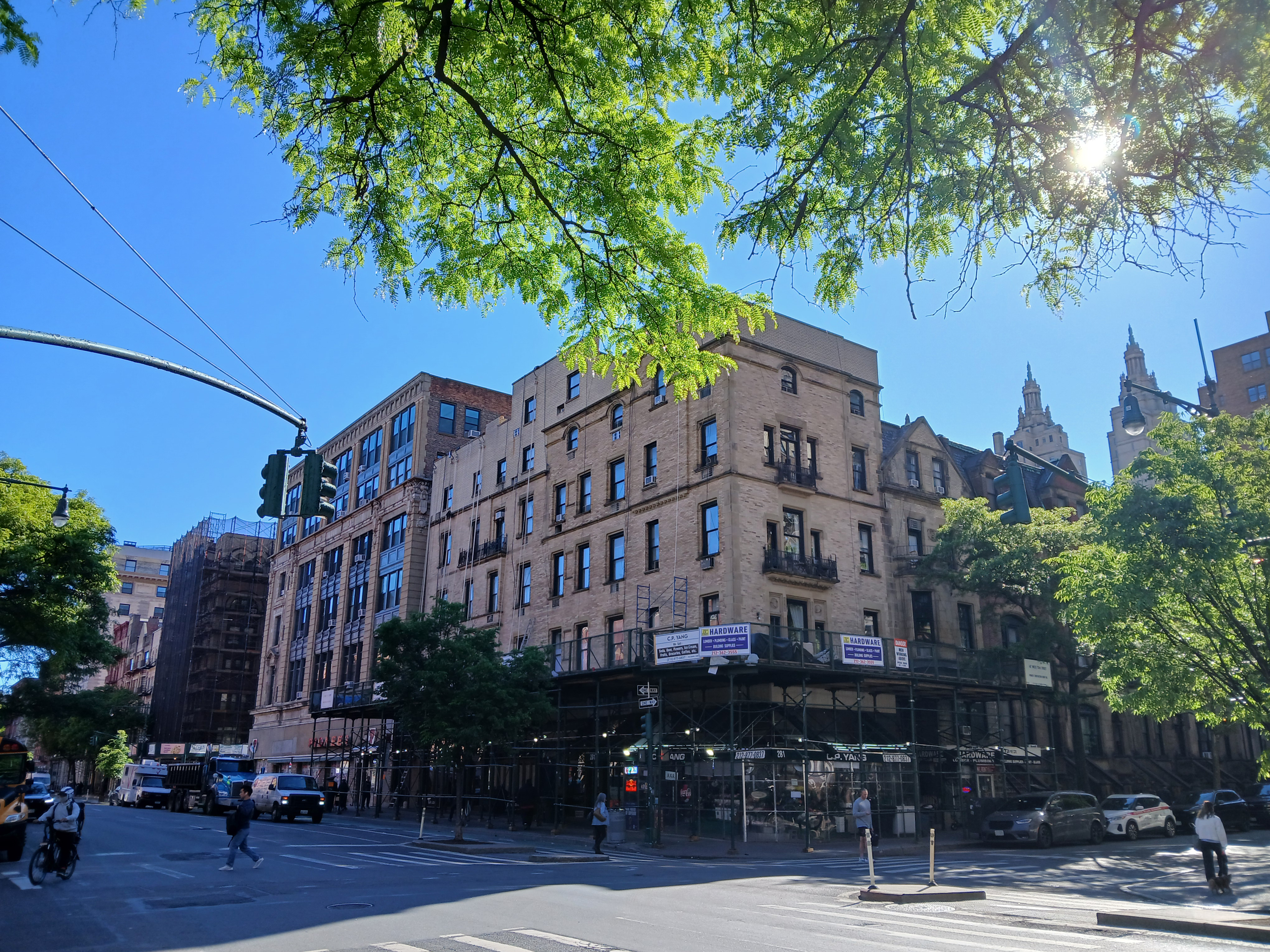
The commercial building at 73rd Street and Columbus Avenue, which was part of the initial development

The first houses in the district, on 73rd Street, were designed by Henry J. Hardenbergh and built for Edward Cabot Clark, developer of the Dakota, which was located immediately south of the 73rd Street houses. Clark believed that the presence of the Ninth Avenue elevated would encourage the growth of a middle-class neighborhood on the West Side. He had bought the site of the Dakota in 1877, consisting of 30 lots south of 73rd Street, extending south to 72nd Street. The next year, Clark assembled two additional plots of land on 73rd Street, extending east and west of Columbus (then Ninth) Avenue. One of these assemblages was a set of 28 lots on the northern sidewalk extending east toward Central Park West (then Eighth Avenue). Another site extended west toward Amsterdam (Tenth) Avenue. These were all intended as part of a single development project.

Clark announced plans in 1879 for the Dakota, for which Hardenbergh drew up designs the next year. Afterward, Hardenbergh designed the houses on 73rd Street. By 1881, Clark had acquired most of the land on Block 1126, except for five parcels. Work on Clark's row houses began in 1882, the year he died. Two building permits were obtained: one for the eastern houses at 13–27 West 73rd Street and another for the western houses at numbers 29–67. The eastern houses were finished first, in 1884, the same year the Dakota was finished. The western houses were completed the next year. Initially, these houses spanned the entire blockfront from 15A to 65 West 73rd Street; these houses cost $15,000 each or about $500,000 total. Both the row houses and the Dakota were served by a mechanical plant below a garden to the west of the Dakota. The local trade journal Real Estate Record and Guide praised the row houses' designs, saying "the detail is generally more fortunate than that of the Dakota" and criticizing the apartment building's facade as overly detailed. The historian Christopher Gray retrospectively wrote that the detailed brick designs were "the antithesis of the typical lugubrious brownstone row and also of the jazzy asymmetrical facades that were gaining a brief moment of fashion". After Edward C. Clark's death, Hardenbergh never designed another building for the Clark family.

=== Further rowhouses ===
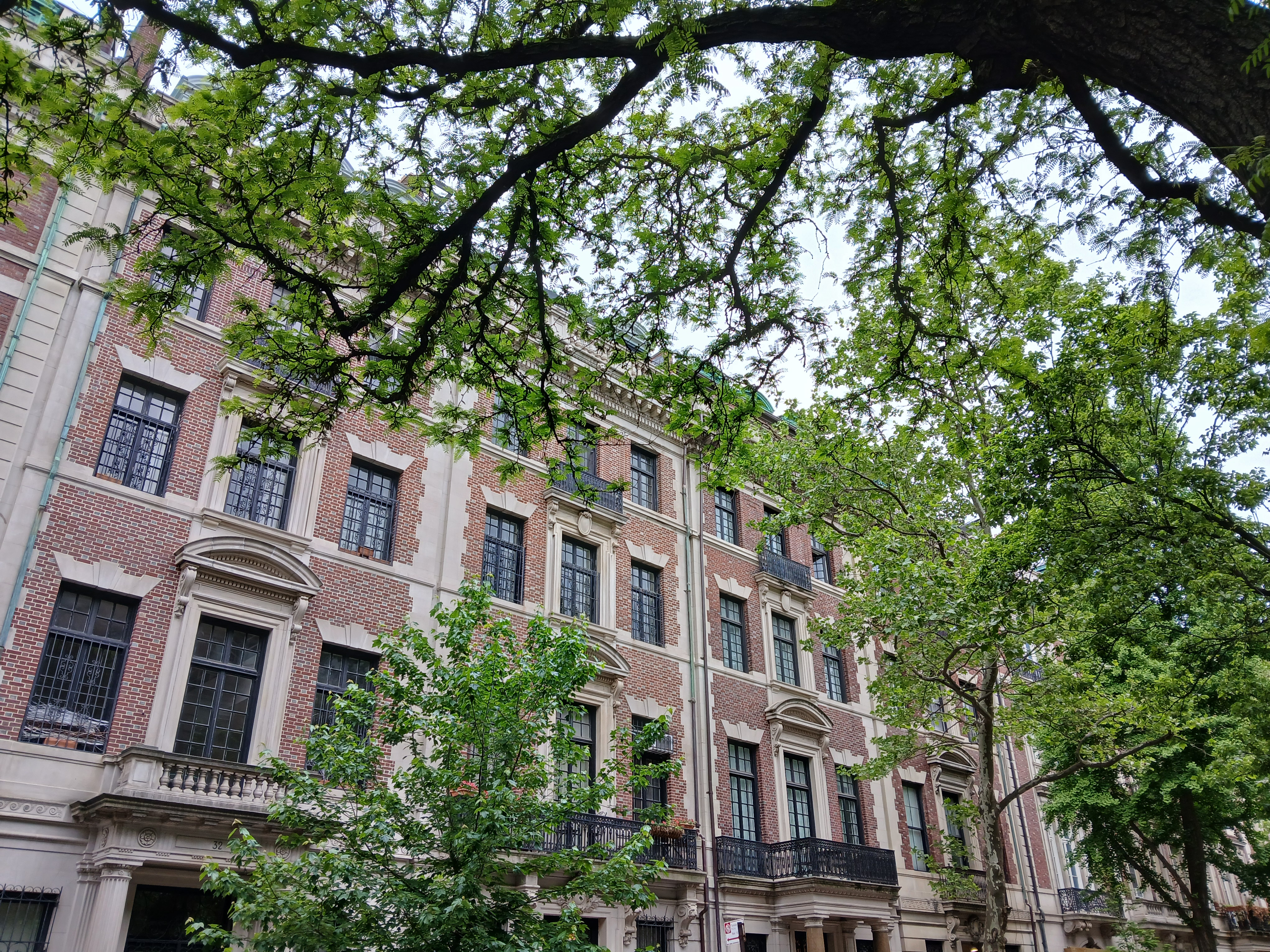
The houses on 74th Street, part of the early-1900s wave of development

By 1889, the Clark estate had applied for judicial permission to place a restrictive covenant on the 74th Street sites (at the northern end of Block 1126), similar to a covenant that already covered the 73rd Street lots. Cornelius W. Luyster bought the four lots at 10–16 West 74th Street in 1891, while Clark's grandson Frederick Ambrose Clark obtained the remaining lots. Luyster and Frederick Clark agreed on a covenant that limited the height and density of buildings on that block. Luyster built his four houses the same year, hiring John H. Duncan to design them. The Clark estate continued to own the remaining lots on the south side of 74th Street.

The Clark estate hired Percy Griffin to design eighteen residences on their 74th Street property in 1901, and these houses were built at 18–52 West 74th Street between 1902 and 1904. The Clark family rented the houses to tenants, rather than selling them, as was the practice for conventional houses. The Real Estate Record and Guide wrote that "it may be confidently assumed that they will be rented only to a very desirable class of tenants, thus making a choice neighborhood". Clark hired George Henry Griebel to design the six-story Art Studio Building at 289–295 Columbus Avenue, at the southeast corner with 74th Street, which was completed in 1903. Thomas M. and William W. Hall built five additional houses at 3–11 West 73rd Street between 1902 and 1903, and two houses were built at 6–8 West 74th Street between 1904 and 1906. Clark also sold the Langham site to Abraham Boehm and Lewis Coon, who built the Langham there in 1907.

=== New apartments and later years ===
The Clark family rented their 74th Street houses out until the 1920s. Their first sale of a house on 74th Street took place in December 1919, when a merchant bought 32 West 74th Street. In the 1920s, an apartment building was constructed at 21–39 West 73rd Street, separating the original 73rd Street houses into two groupings of addresses: 15A–19 to the east, and 41–65 to the west. Known as the Park Royal and completed in 1926, it was developed by the 23 West 73rd Street Corporation, which lost it to foreclosure just two years later.

By the mid-20th century, the once-upscale houses on the block had been subdivided after their previous upper-income residents had moved to other parts of the city, such as the East Side. In May 1940, a developer acquired the houses at 8–12 West 74th Street; the site was later expanded to encompass number 14 as well. The four sites were replaced with the 10 West 74th Street apartment house. By then, all of the rowhouses were occupied by a minimum of two families each; the house at 15A (formerly 13) West 73rd Street had 29 occupants, more than any other on the block.

The New York City Landmarks Preservation Commission (LPC) designated all of the properties bounded by 73rd Street, Central Park West, 74th Street, and Columbus Avenue as part of the Central Park West-73rd–74th Streets Historic District in 1977. These properties, except for the Langham, were listed on the National Register of Historic Places (NRHP) in 1983. The entire district was also nominated as part of the LPC's Upper West Side–Central Park West Historic District in the late 1980s; this larger district was designated in 1990. Most of the original interiors had been severely altered by the early 21st century, and relatively few high-income buyers were willing to acquire and restore the buildings.

== See also ==
- List of New York City Designated Landmarks in Manhattan from 59th to 110th Streets
- National Register of Historic Places listings in Manhattan from 59th to 110th Streets
- West 76th Street Historic District, two blocks north, also overlaid by the Upper West Side/Central Park West Historic District
- West 67th Street Artists' Colony, to the south, also overlaid by the Upper West Side/Central Park West Historic District

== Sources ==
- Alpern, Andrew (2015). The Dakota: A History of the World's Best-Known Apartment Building. Princeton Architectural Press. ISBN 978-1-61689-437-5. OCLC 915135755.
- Central Park West - West 73rd/74th Street Historic District (PDF) (Report). New York City Landmarks Preservation Commission. April 19, 1973.
- Central Park West – 76th Street Historic District (PDF) (Report). New York City Landmarks Preservation Commission. April 19, 1973.
- Diamonstein-Spielvogel, Barbaralee (2011). The Landmarks of New York (5th ed.). Albany, New York: State University of New York Press. ISBN 978-1-4384-3769-9.
- National Register of Historic Places Inventory/Nomination: West 73rd–74th Street Historic District (PDF) (Report). National Park Service. 1983.
