= George Henry Griebel =

Berlin-born American architect

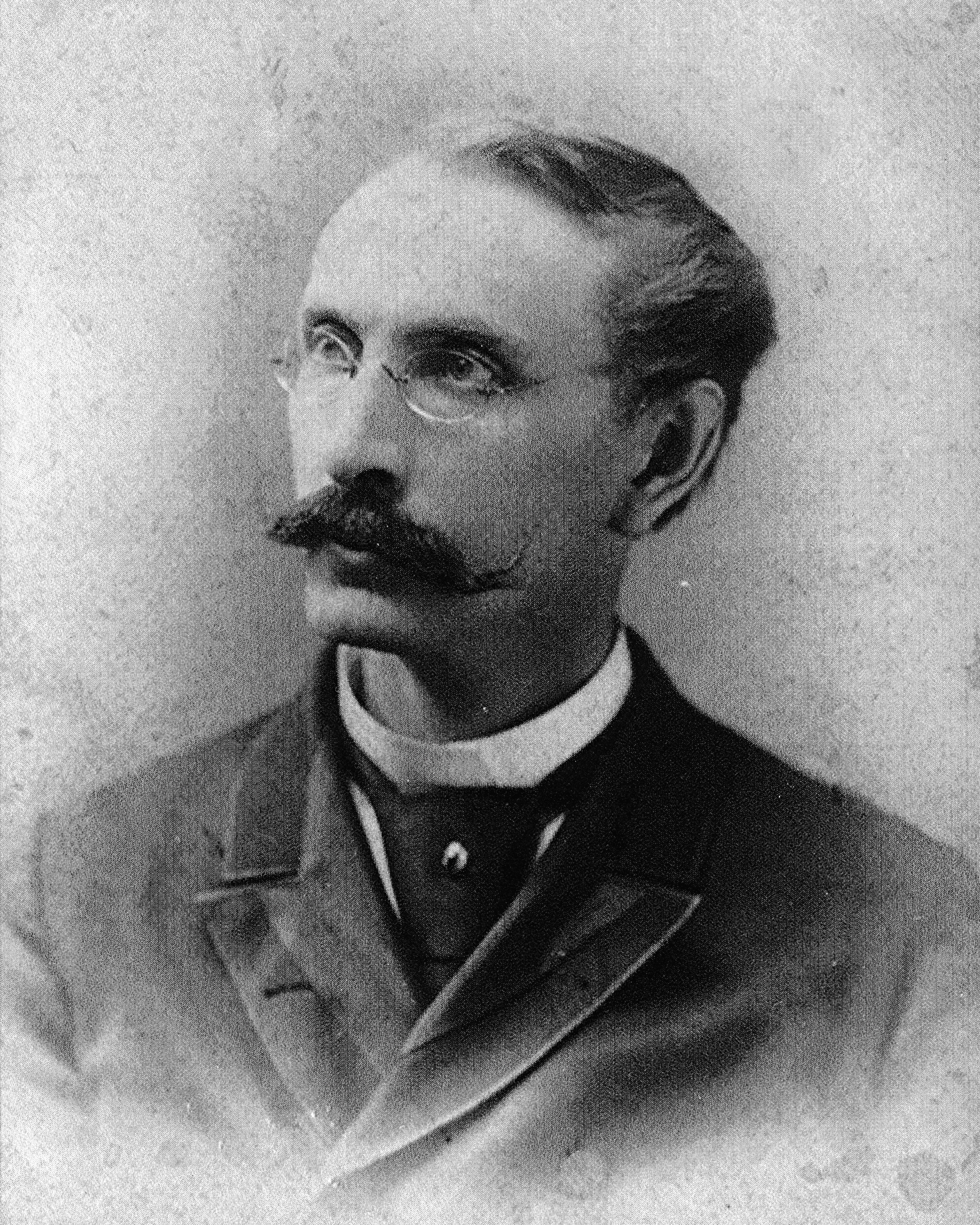
George H Griebel, architect

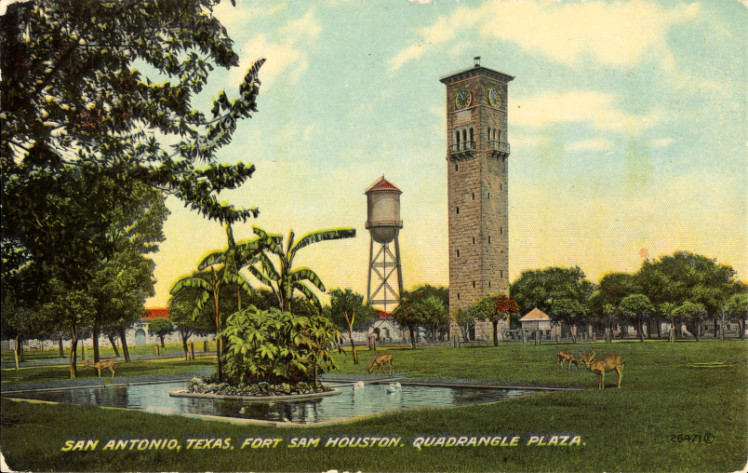
Quadrangle, Fort Sam Houston

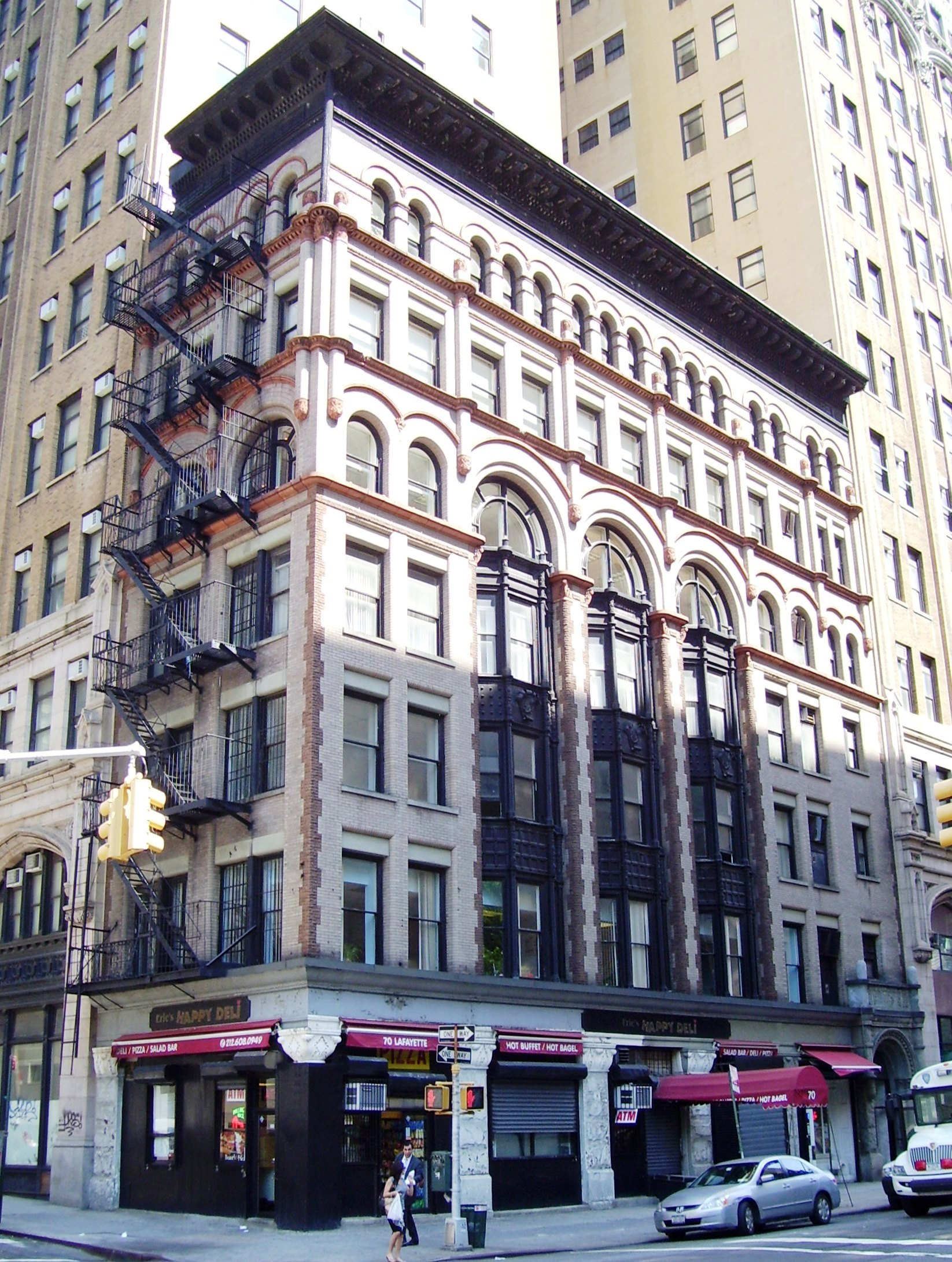
Ahrens Building 70 Lafayette Street

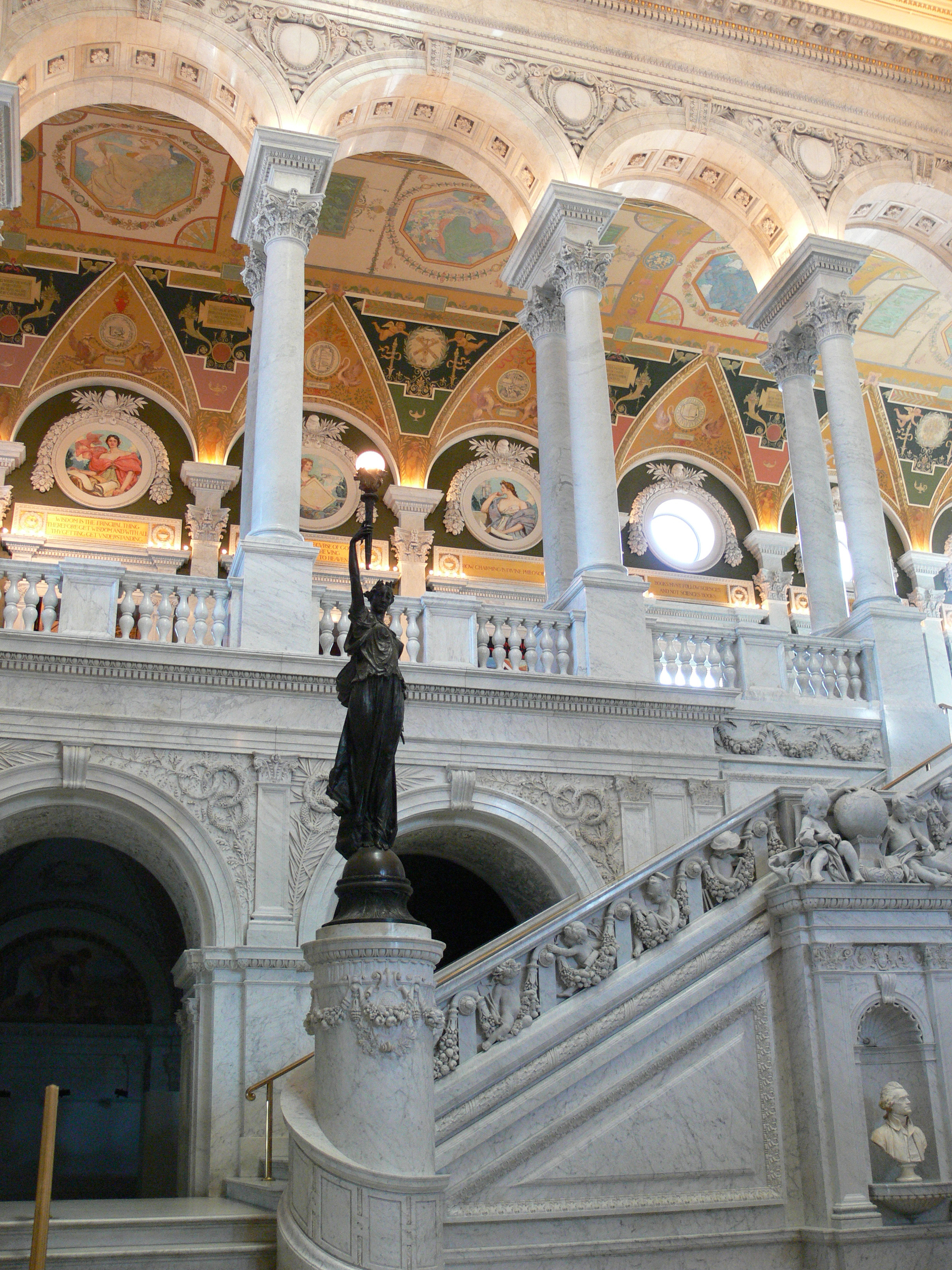
Staircase in the Great Hall in the Library of Congress

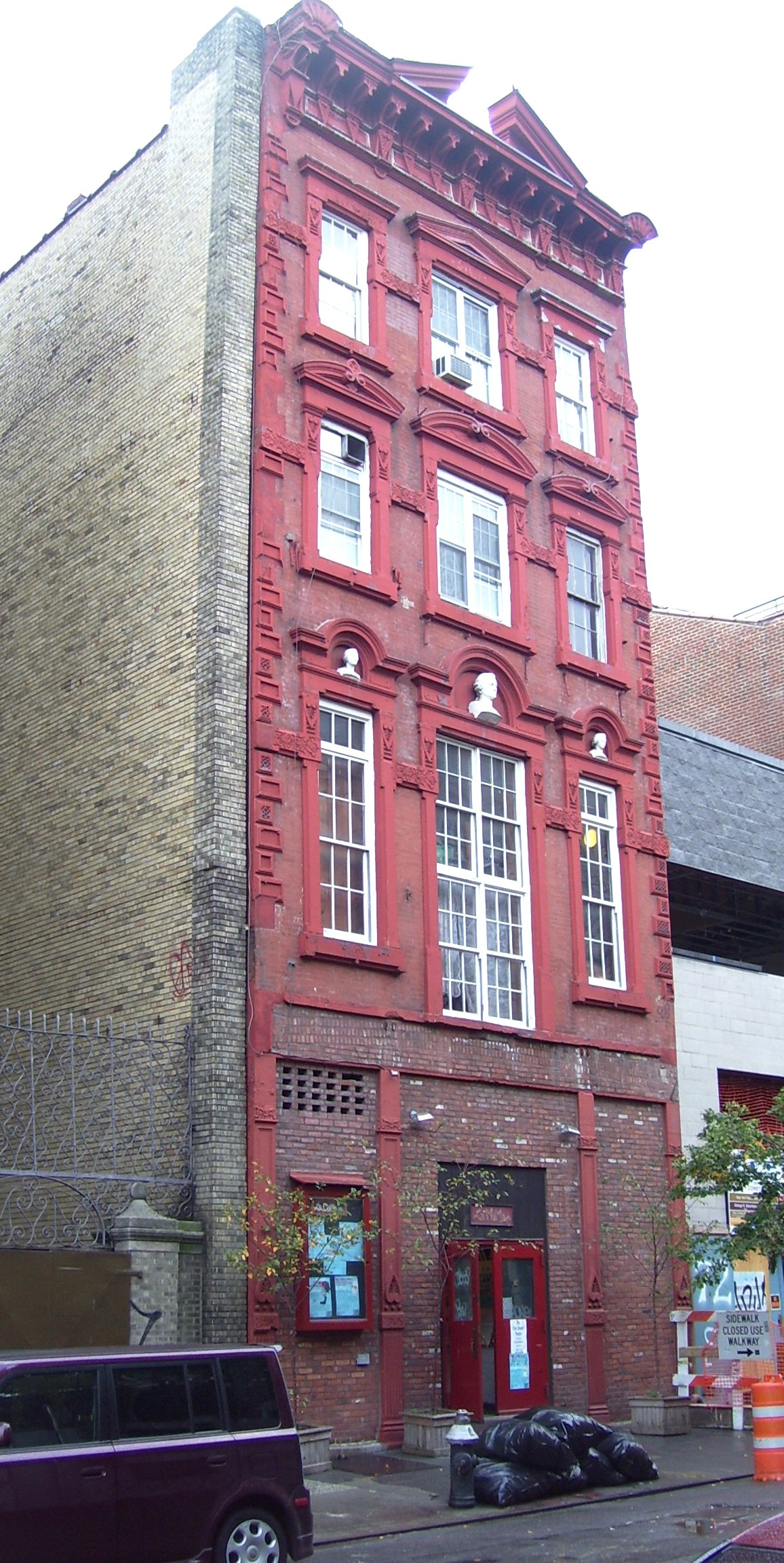
Aschbroedel Clubhouse at 74A East 4th Street, Manhattan

George Henry Griebel (13 August 1846 – March 1933) was a prominent Berlin-born and trained architect who resided in New York City. He designed numerous public and private buildings, many of which are still standing in New York City, Philadelphia, and Washington DC. However, because at the time an architect did not receive credit for his work unless he owned his own firm, Griebel is largely uncredited for buildings such as the Dakota and other luxury apartment buildings in New York City, a staircase in the Library of Congress, the design for Grant's Row, planned as the home of embassies in Washington, DC, and many other buildings. The original architectural drawings of the Dakota and the Singer Building are in the private collection of the Griebel family.

== Early Prussian life ==
The Griebels were a wealthy and influential family from Berlin, Brandenburg, Prussia. George came from a musical family whose rank belongs to the royal orchestras of King Frederick II of Prussia. His father, Julius Heinrich Griebel (1809–1865), was a cellist and music master of the Royal Prussian Court Orchestra (königlich preußische Hofkapelle) and also conductor of the Soirren Quartet which gave concerts in many countries. His grandfather, Johann Heinrich Griebel, first teacher of the composer Albert Lortzing, and his great uncle, George Ritter, were bassoonists with the Imperial Chapel. His uncles, Heinrich Franz Griebel (oboe) and Ferdinand Griebel (violin), were also members of the Imperial Royal Chamber Music Orchestra. Since three generations of Griebels were employed by three generations of the House of Hohenzollern, Griebel had ample exposure to and training in the North German Renaissance style.

== Training ==
George was educated at a military academy for the Engineer Corps of the Prussian Army. In 1865 he left the army and migrated to New York City with his brother, Maximilliam, a violinist. He continued his studies at Georgetown University in Washington DC.

== Career from 1865 to 1880 ==
He moved to Washington, DC, in 1865 and opened an office. In 1869, he accepted employment in the War Department and for some years held the position of architect and engineer to the Quartermaster-General's Office, War Department. He was sent West to San Antonio, Texas, and built the quadrangle at Fort Sam Houston in 1871.

In Washington, DC, he designed the staircase in the Great Hall of the Library of Congress. Next to the Library of Congress he designed residences for embassies in the land on which the Folger Shakespeare Library now stands. "Back in the early 70s, when old Washington was expected to grow to the east from the face of the Capital, Grant row was built in elaborate style after designs by a German architect named Griebel, in the belief that embassies and legations would be attracted to Capital Hill and that the section would become the most attractive residential section of the city....Failing in the original plan of becoming a focal point of the elite of Washington society, these houses, nevertheless, held a place of their own in Washington realty...Many members of the Congress occupied these houses after their completion but for some reason the embassies did not spread in that direction." "The residents of Capitol Hill welcome this new structure in their neighborhood but they will not soon forget old Grant Row, a line of well built red brick houses set far back from the street on the site now occupied by the Folger Library."

== Later career in New York City ==
In 1880 Griebel established himself in New York City. He married Frances Bourne of the John Geib family of piano makers and the Bourne family known for arts; "Views of New York" NYHS, and anti-slavery work. He was almost fifty when his wife died and left him with three small children. In honor of his first daughter, Alma, he put a design of her on one of his buildings.

He designed with Karl Jacobsen and "superintended the construction of the Dakota Apartment Hotel for the Clark Estate, while for the same estate, during a period of eighteen years, he erected several fine structures and rows of building, such as the Singer Manufacturing Company's Office Building, Third Avenue and 16th Street; fourteen houses on West Eighty-fifth Street, with a row on West Seventy-third Street, both rows being near Columbus Avenue; the Barnett Store, Seventy-fourth Street and Columbus Avenue, and many others." Karl Jacobsen married Daisy, a friend of his daughter, Edna B. Griebel, who was a composer of classical music. He and the children lived most of their lives in an apartment that had been converted from a chapel. He was a gentle and amiable man, thin of frame, and possessing a strong Prussian accent.

In 1903 he designed the Art Studio Building in Manhattan. Other buildings erected by him include the Aschenbroedel Clubhouse, on East Eighty-sixth Street, of which he was made a life member in recognition of his efficient services; the Unger Storage and Power Building, 46 Huston Street; the Ahrens Building, corner of Elm and Franklin streets; the Majestic Apartment House, corner of St Nicholas and One Hundred and Forty-fifth Street, and many other buildings, equally prominent, including clubhouses, apartment hotels, and business buildings."

He died at 93 years of age.
