= Ahrens Building =

Commercial building in Manhattan, New York

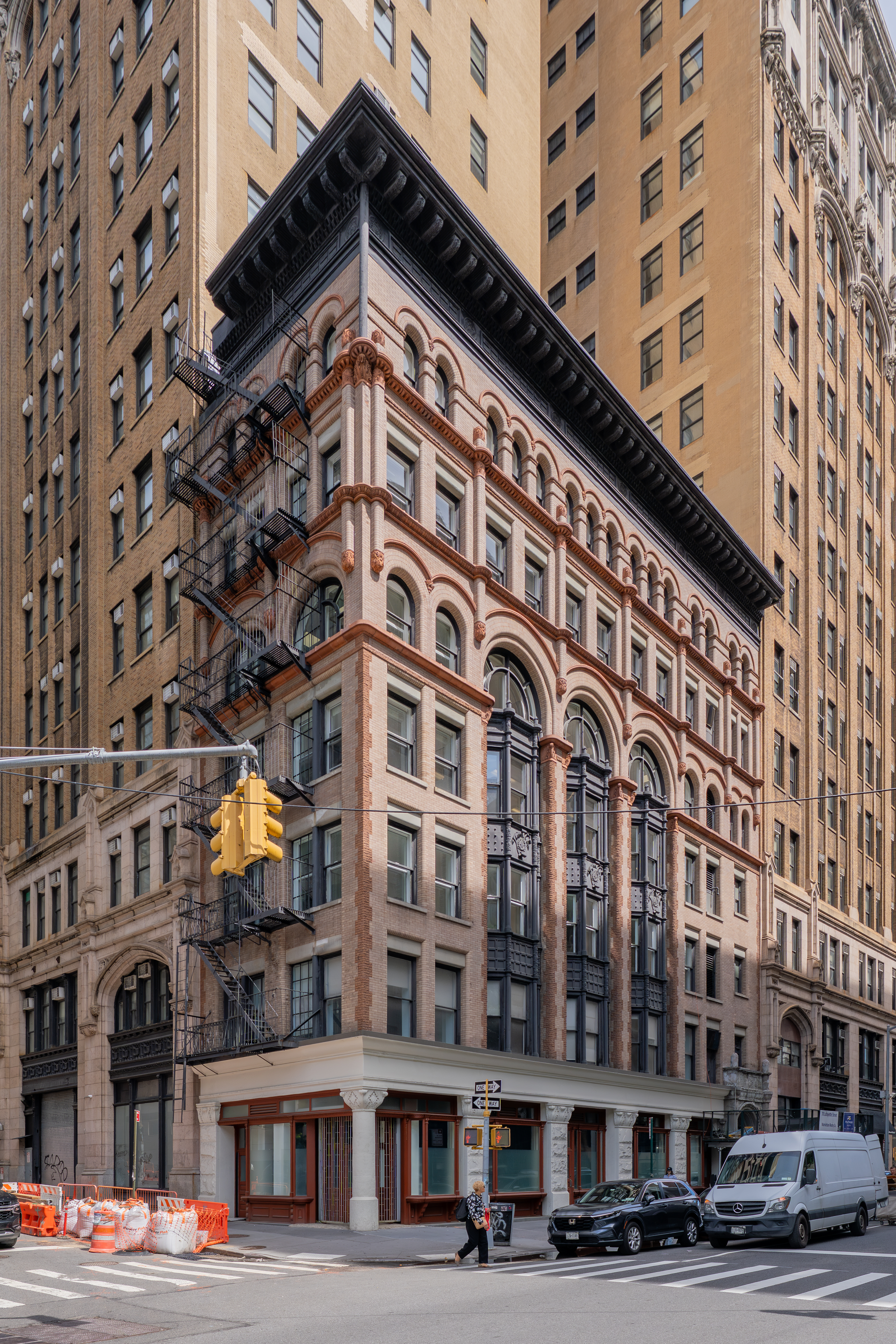
- (2026)
- Interactive map of the Ahrens Building area

General information
- Type: Commercial
- Location: 70 Lafayette Street on corner of Franklin Street, Civic Center, Manhattan, New York City
- Coordinates: 40°43′01″N 74°00′08″W
- Construction started: 1894
- Completed: 1895

Technical details
- Floor count: 7

Design and construction
- Architect: George Henry Griebel

New York City Landmark
- Designated: January 14, 1992
- Reference no.: 1759

The Ahrens Building is a seven-story Romanesque Revival / Richardsonian Romanesque building in the Civic Center neighborhood of Manhattan, New York City. The building's design, by architect George Henry Griebel, blends polychrome brickwork, terra cotta and metal over a limestone base. The building was designated a New York City Landmark in 1992.

== History ==
In 1879, liquor store owner Herman F. Ahrens purchased two properties at the corner of Elm and Franklin Streets from the William Briggs estate. The property contained two frame structures, a larger one at the corner (40 Franklin Street) and a smaller one facing Elm Street, where Ahrens moved his liquor store. In 1881, a municipal project to widen Elm Street would have forced the demolition of Ahrens' properties, leading him to develop the present-day Ahrens Building as a speculative development.

Construction was briefly halted, after union workers walked off the job after learning of non-union steamfitter workers were involved in construction of the building. The Sprague Electric company installed six elevators for the building on February 16, 1895.

The Ahrens Building remained in the Ahrens family until 1968, when Morris and Herbert Moskowitz acquired the property. After the sale of the building, the upper floors (which were used as storage space since the 1940s) were renovated back to office space. The ground floor has housed several bars and restaurant since the 1960s.

== See also ==
- List of New York City Designated Landmarks in Manhattan below 14th Street
