= St. Stephen's Methodist Church =

- U.S. National Register of Historic Places
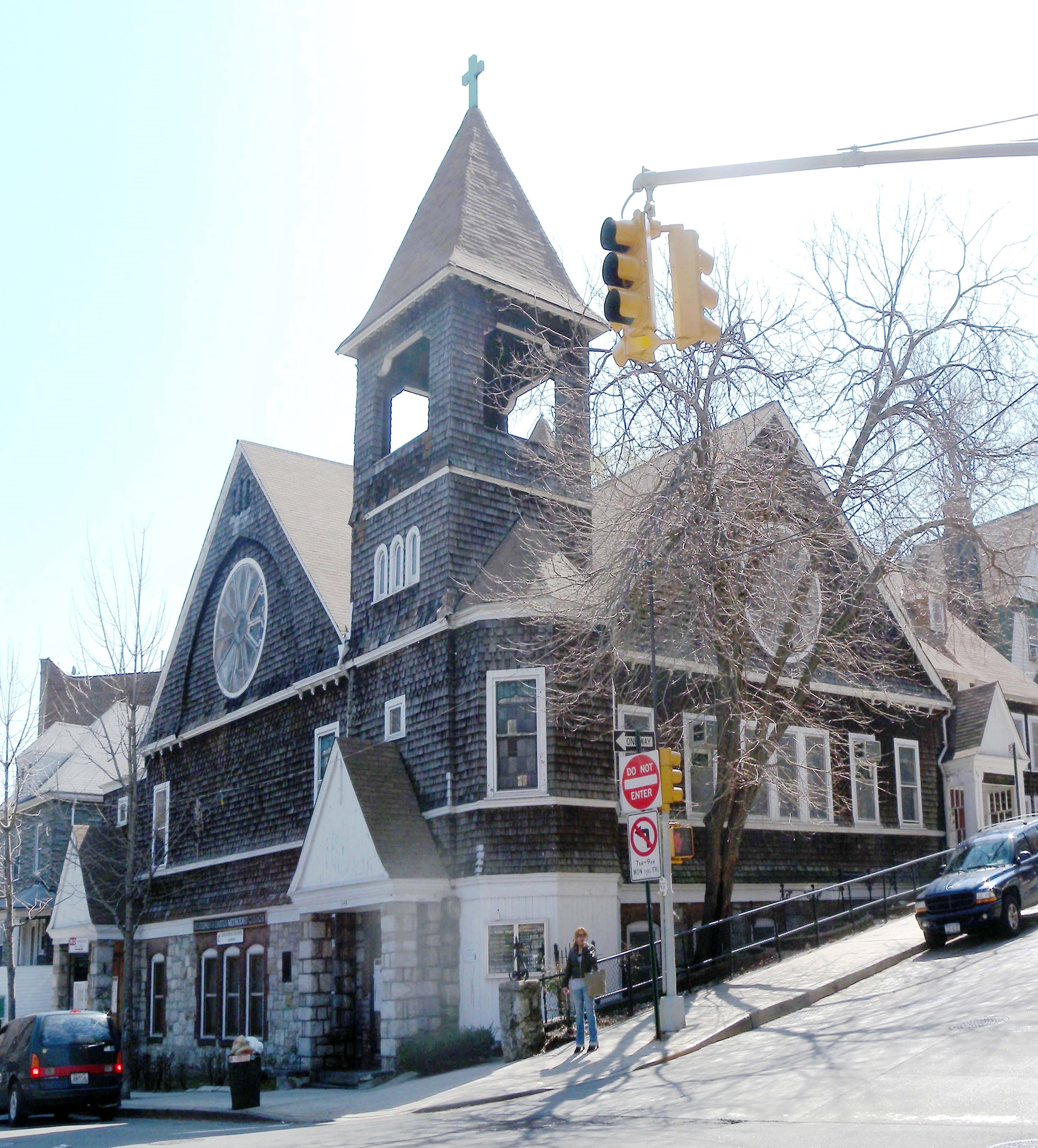
- St. Stephen's Methodist Church, April 2009

- Location within New York City Location within New York Location within the United States
- Location: 146 W. 228th St., Bronx, New York
- Coordinates: 40°52′37″N 73°54′33″W
- Area: 0.16 acres (0.065 ha)
- Built: 1897-1898
- Architect: Alexander McMillan Welch
- Architectural style: Shingle style, Queen Anne
- NRHP reference No.: 12000008
- Added to NRHP: February 8, 2012

St. Stephen's Methodist Church is a historic Methodist church located in the Marble Hill neighborhood of Bronx, New York City. The church was designed by architect Alexander McMillan Welch and built in 1897. It is a two-story, Shingle style church on a raised basement. It has a cross-gable roof topped by a small cupola, a rose window on the front facade, and features a pronounced bell tower with an open belfry and balconies. The interior is based on the Akron Plan. The church has an attached Sunday School wing with a hipped roof. Also on the property is the contributing two-story, Queen Anne style frame parsonage.

It was added to the National Register of Historic Places in 2012.
