= Alexander McMillan Welch =

American architect

- Born: 1869
- Died: 1943 (aged 73–74)
- Occupation: Architect

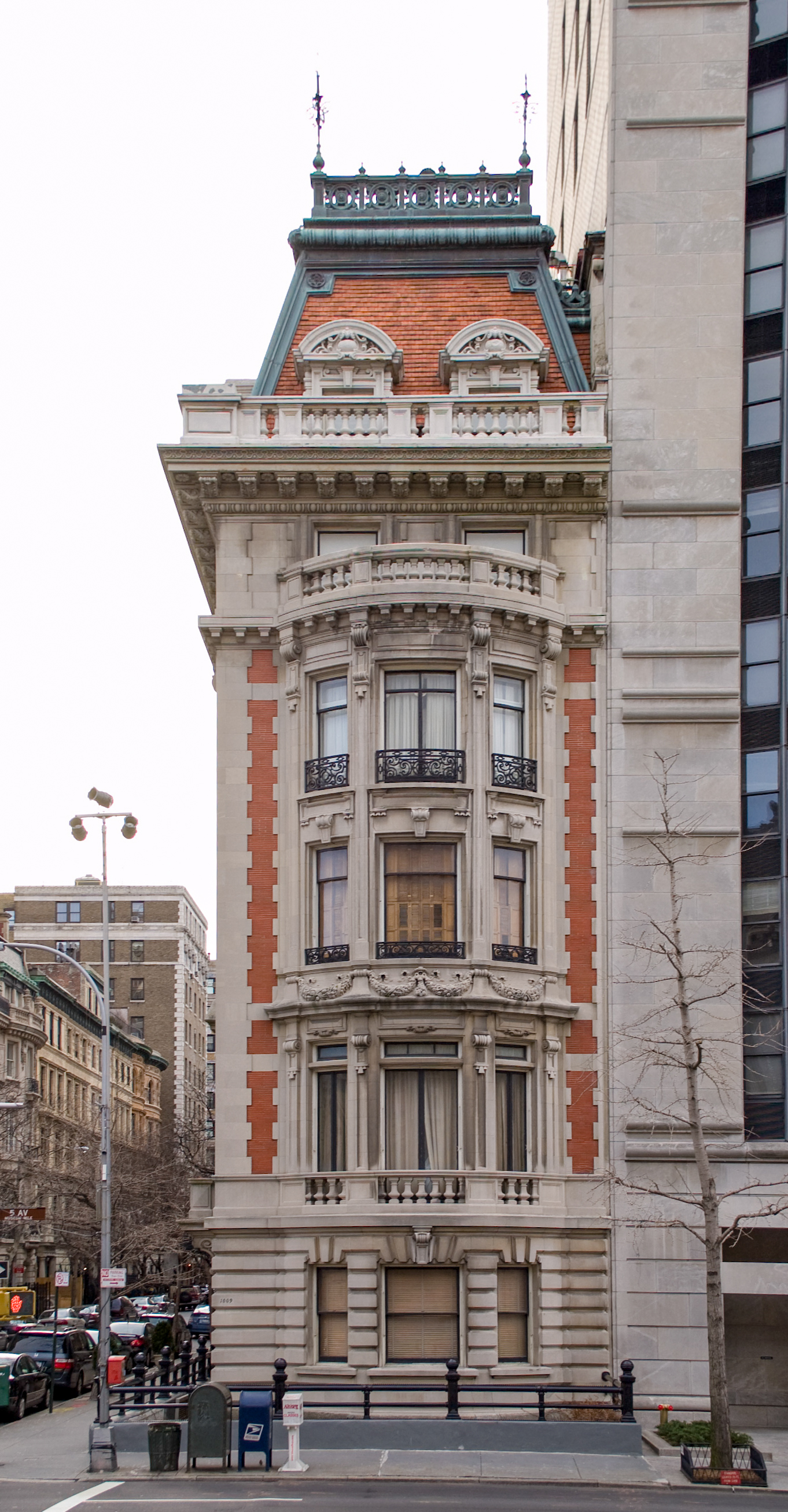
The Benjamin N. Duke House at 1009 Fifth Avenue, 1899-1901

Alexander McMillan Welch (1869–1943) was an American architect trained in the Beaux-Arts tradition, who led the New York City firm of Welch, Smith & Provot, in partnership with Bowen B. Smith and George Provot.

== Life and career ==
Welch, a descendant of Philip Welch, who emigrated to Ipswich, Massachusetts in 1654, graduated from Columbia University and the École des Beaux-Arts in Paris. Under the influence of his brother-in-law, Bashford Dean, Welch collected some antique swords.

The firm's trademark style of discreet brick and limestone townhouses in neo-Georgian style is embodied in the Benjamin N. Duke House at 1009 Fifth Avenue, one of a row of four houses built in 1899-1901 for the speculative builders William and Thomas Hall. Number 1009 was purchased by the tobacco magnate Benjamin Newton Duke. Similar rowhouses by Welch, Smith & Provot are 28 through 38 West 86th Street (1906–1908), 5 and 7 East 75th Street (1901), 3–11 West 73rd Street, and 6–8 West 74th Street (1903–1904).

Welch was the consulting architect in restorations made to a number of designated historical landmarks, including Alexander Hamilton's Hamilton Grange in the Hamilton Heights neighborhood of Upper Manhattan, George Washington's Headquarters in White Plains, New York, and the Dutch Colonial Dyckman House in Inwood, Manhattan. Welch married Fannie Fredericka Dyckman on June 2, 1896. She and her sister, Mrs Bashford Dean presented the Dyckman house to New York City in 1916.

== Selected commissions ==
- The New French Hospital, 450-58 West 34th Street, New York (1905), for the French Benevolent Society, as the result of a competition supervised by A.D.F. Hamlin, Columbia University. Isolated sunrooms at the rear south-facing facade were provided for each floor. The tuberculosis ward on the top floor was isolated from the others.
- The St. Stephen's Methodist Church (1897-1898) was added to the National Register of Historic Places in 2012.
