= Dyckman House =

Historic house in Manhattan, New York

- U.S. National Register of Historic Places
- U.S. National Historic Landmark
- New York State Register of Historic Places
- New York City Landmark
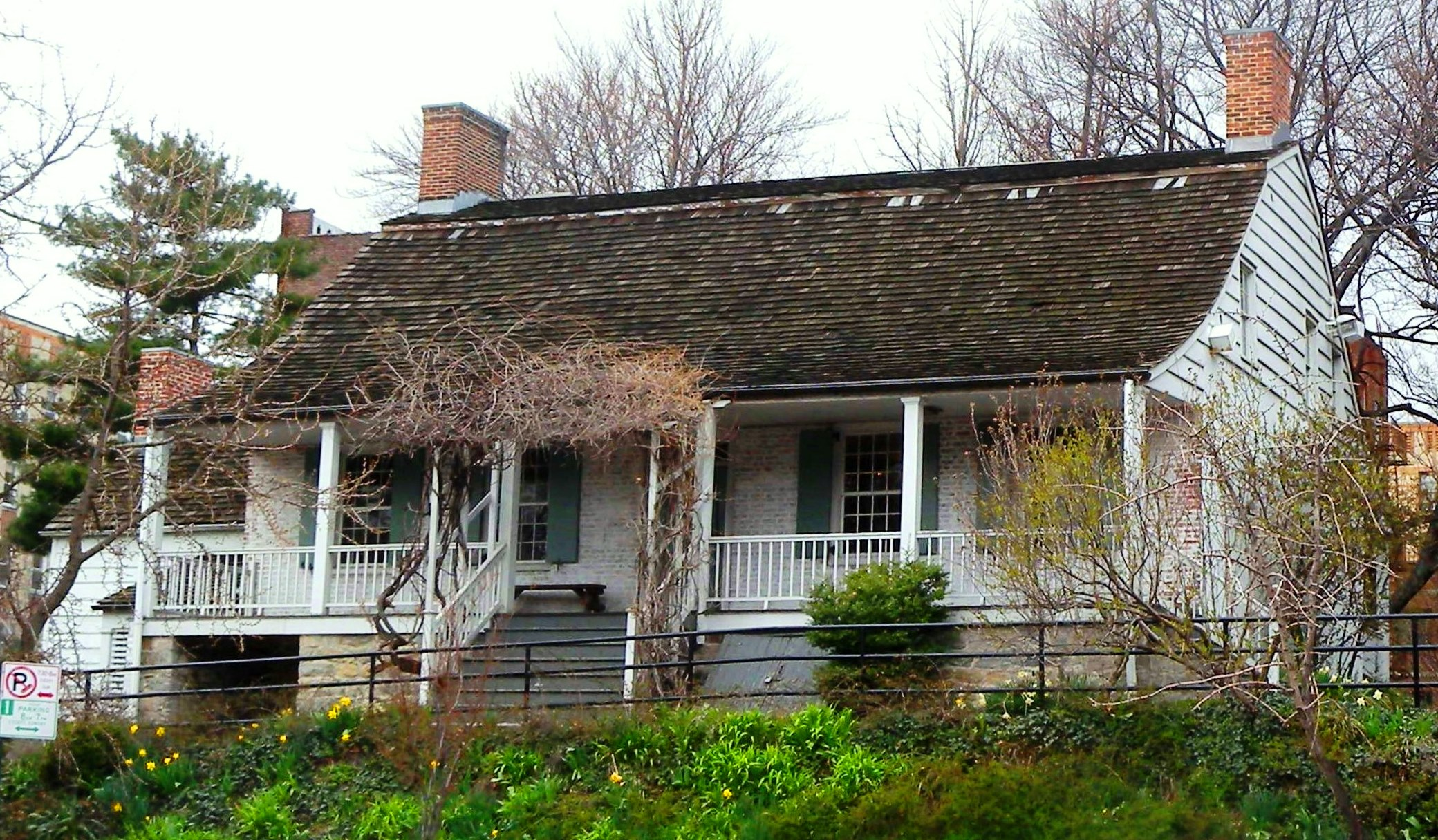
- (2011)

- Location within New York City Location within New York Location within the United States
- Interactive map of Dyckman House
- Location: 4881 Broadway; Manhattan, New York, US
- Coordinates: 40°52′02″N 73°55′23″W
- Built: c. 1783–1785
- Architectural style: Dutch Colonial
- NRHP reference No.: 67000014
- NYSRHP No.: 06101.001689
- NYCL No.: 0309

Significant dates
- Added to NRHP: December 24, 1967
- Designated NHL: December 24, 1967
- Designated NYSRHP: June 23, 1980
- Designated NYCL: July 12, 1967

The Dyckman House, now the Dyckman Farmhouse Museum, is a Dutch Colonial-style farmhouse at Broadway and 204th Street in the Inwood neighborhood of Manhattan, New York City, United States. Operated as a historic house museum, the house was the third built by William Dyckman, c. 1783–1785, and was originally part of over 250 acres (100 ha) of farmland owned by the family. It is the oldest remaining farmhouse on Manhattan island, a vestige of New York City's rural past. The house is a New York City designated landmark and a National Historic Landmark.

William Dyckman's family were among the first settlers of what is now Inwood, and Dyckman initially built two houses in the area. After the second house was destroyed in the American Revolutionary War, the third house was constructed. The house stayed in the family for several generations until 1868, and ownership was transferred several times in the late 19th and early 20th centuries. By the 1910s, the house was in disrepair and in danger of being demolished. The Dyckman family transferred ownership of the house to the government of New York City in 1916. Since then, the house has operated as a museum.

The house is placed atop a hillock, which rises above Broadway. The Dyckman House is an early example of a gambrel-roofed house in New York City, with a two-story facade of fieldstone, brick, and white clapboard. There are 14 rooms within the Dyckman House. When the house opened as a museum, it displayed Revolutionary and Native American artifacts and the Dyckman family's possessions, though the collection has expanded over the years. The house has been praised for its architecture and collections and has been depicted in exhibits and print publications.

== Site ==
The Dyckman House is located at 4881 Broadway, at the corner with 204th Street, in the Inwood neighborhood of Manhattan, New York City, United States. The house is placed atop a hillock, which rises about 15 feet (4.6 m) above the adjacent segment of Broadway. The property is surrounded by a fieldstone retaining wall. The surrounding sites consist of apartment buildings, and there is an exposed outcropping of Manhattan schist around the corner on Cooper Street.

== History ==
=== Residential use ===
==== Context and development ====
The Dyckman family were among the first settlers of what is now Inwood. William Dyckman (1725–1787) was the grandson of Jan Dyckman, who came to the area from Westphalia in 1660 or 1661. William had built a family house located on the Harlem River near the present 210th Street in 1748. The family house stood on a farm spanning 300 acres (120 ha), which once extended between Fort George to the south and 230th Street to the north. This farm contained a cemetery until the early 20th century, when the bodies there were removed to make way for the New York City Subway's IRT Broadway–Seventh Avenue Line and later the 207th Street Yard.

The first house was replaced by a larger structure. Although William was not his family's firstborn son, he inherited the estate in 1773 because he had the "most family traits". During the American Revolutionary War, the Continental Army stayed on the Dyckmans' land from September to November 1776, when British troops defeated the Continental Army in the Battle of White Plains. One of the family's sons pledged support to the British Loyalists, but later switched to supporting the American Patriots. Possibly as retaliation, the British destroyed the second house. During the war, British troops erected huts on the Dyckman estate, including the site of the Dyckman House. The British and the Hessians occupied the Dyckman site until Evacuation Day in 1783.

William decided to rebuild the house elsewhere. He chose to construct a new house along the Albany Post Road (now Broadway), which ran along the middle of Manhattan Island and was on higher ground. His oldest son Jacobus Dyckman built the current farmhouse. There is disagreement over when exactly the Dyckman Farmhouse was built. An American Architect article and a book about the house, both written in the 1910s, described the house as having been built in 1783. Different dates of 1784 and 1785 are given in other sources discussing the house. The Dyckmans constructed their new house using bricks, bolts, nails, hinges, locks, and latches that had been salvaged from Hessian soldiers' huts in the neighborhood. Materials from the old house may have been reused in the new farmhouse.

==== 19th century ====
William deeded the house to his mother because he had assumed that his mother would outlive him. After William Dyckman died in 1787, there was a dispute over who owned the house, as William's mother was also dead; it was not until 1795 that his son Jacobus took title to the house. In its early years, the Dyckman family used slaves; sources disagree on whether there were six or seven slaves at the house. The first slaves on the farm were Black Americans and Native Americans. Some of the first slaves intermarried, and their children worked on the farm until slavery in New York was abolished. Jacobus owned the house until his death in 1832, upon which the house passed to his sons Isaac and Michael. The farmhouse was used as an overnight shelter for cattle herds that the family took to the market, prompting their brothers to move out. Upon Michael's death in 1854, Isaac took over his brother's share in the house. Before taking over the farm, Isaac changed his last name from Smith to Dyckman. Isaac later moved to 15 East 71st Street on the Upper East Side.

The house stayed in the family for several generations until 1868, when Isaac died. The estate was sold off because Isaac had no sons. The Dyckmans owned most of the land in Inwood until the late 19th century, when it was auctioned off. John H. Judge and his family bought the house at an auction. Ownership of the site is known to have been transferred several times in the late 19th and early 20th centuries. The house was renovated c. 1880 when the roof tiles were replaced, the porch was rebuilt, and the woodwork was restored. Around the same time, the Dyckmans restored the stonework of their house's well, and they built an imitation of the farm's original smokehouse.

=== Museum use ===
==== Establishment ====
The opening of the New York City Subway's first line in the 1900s had spurred development in the area, which had become known as the "Dyckman district" by the early 1910s. The house was in disrepair and in danger of being demolished. Furthermore, the old farm had been parceled off, and the boundaries of the land lots on the block had been finalized by 1913. The Dyckman family's remains had been relocated from a nearby private burial ground due to concerns over neglect. When Isham Park opened two blocks away in 1912, preservationists suggested moving the house to the park, protecting it from being replaced by an apartment building. The Judge family offered in late 1913 to give the house to the city if the New York City Department of Parks and Recreation found an appropriate location for it. The Daughters of the American Revolution would have operated the farmhouse as a museum, but nothing came of this proposal.

Two of Isaac's daughters, Mary Alice Dyckman Dean and Fannie Fredericka Dyckman Welch, agreed in September 1915 to give the house to the city and restore the house. The Department of Parks acquired five lots and converted them into Dyckman House Park. Mary and Fannie officially acquired the site from the Judge family on October 6, 1915. The house was restored under the supervision of Fannie's husband, the architect Alexander M. Welch. The work involved salvaging materials from two houses in New Jersey that were about to be demolished. Mary's husband Bashford Dean was involved in collecting memorabilia for the interior. Welch and Dean wished to restore the house's pre-1800 appearance. As such, a rear porch and stone smokehouse were rebuilt, and parts of the original landscaping were reconstructed, including brick walkways, stone steps, and a parterre garden. The north wing of the house was demolished. A group of archeologists and researchers, including Reginald Pelham Bolton, also found artifacts such as old military huts while excavating the old farm. Bolton's team ultimately excavated parts of 45 huts; he reconstructed one such hut using brick and stone from his excavations.

The Dyckman sisters transferred ownership of the house to the government of New York City on July 11, 1916. The transfer included about 0.25 acres (1,000 m^{2}) of land around the house. The city government then opened it as a museum of Dutch and Colonial life, featuring the original Dyckman family furnishings. The Dyckman House was the only remaining farmhouse in Upper Manhattan following the 1914 demolition of the Schermerhorn family's home on 64th Street.

==== Late 1910s to 1970s ====
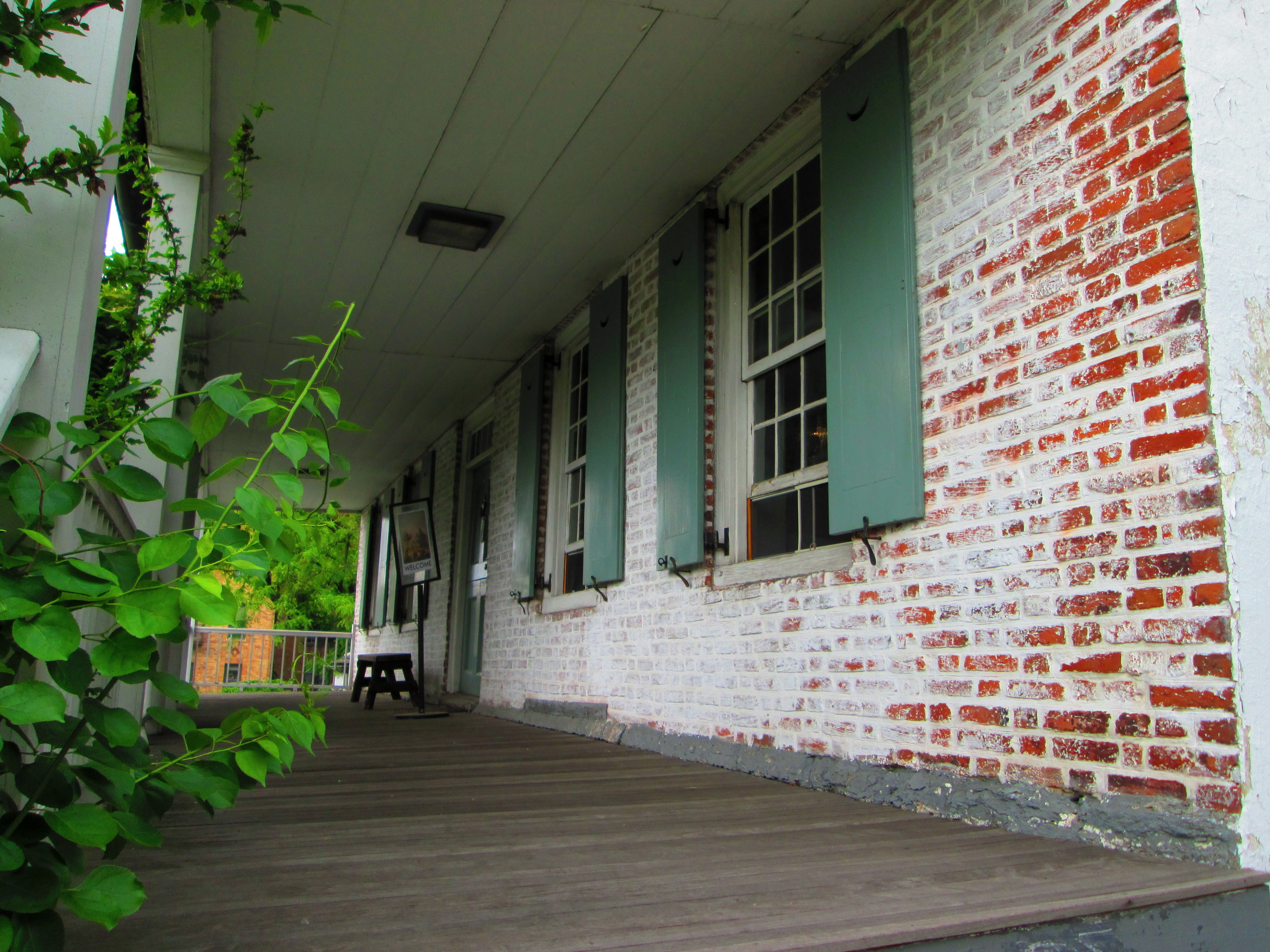
Front porch

In February 1917, the Dyckman sisters gave the city another plot measuring 50 by 150 feet (15 by 46 m), which was used to expand the house's garden and abutted the north side of the house. At the time, the Dyckman House was one of several historical houses in the city that were being preserved, along with structures such as the Lefferts Historic House and Schenck House. The museum's original curator, Charles F. Flitner, and another employee, Martha Rush, had been appointed at the Dyckmans' request. Flitner and Rush were fired in 1918 and replaced with Frederick and Margaret Hensler, two friends of the Manhattan park commissioner, prompting objections from members of the public. Frederick Hensler ultimately served as curator for two years.

After the museum opened, further artifacts such as a Hessian soldier's belt buckle were found on the site. By the early 1920s, many visitors came to get inspiration for furniture and furnishings in their own houses. The Dyckman House and Isham Park were the only remnants of the area's once-rural character, and one lecturer stated in 1934 that the house was arranged "exactly as it was during [the original Mrs. Dyckman's] lifetime". Between 1935 and 1936, the grounds were re-landscaped. The grounds were further expanded in 1944 with the acquisition of another plot to the southwest.

The house was temporarily closed during mid-1953 for a minor renovation, which included repainting and refurbishment. An entrance to the northeast was sealed the same year. The house remained relatively unknown even to those who lived in the neighborhood; a passerby interviewed in 1953 said he assumed that the house was an antique shop. The Times nonetheless wrote that the house was in "excellent condition" during the 1950s. The house was open six days a week in the 1960s, and it charged no admission, a policy that was still in place in the 1970s. By that time, Mrs. Richard P. Dyckman oversaw repairs and expansions to the collection. Over the years, the surrounding neighborhood was filled with apartment buildings and stores that became rundown.

==== 1980s to present ====
By the early 1980s, the house's live-in caretaker, police officer James Henry, recalled that children were "playing tag on the roof". The Metropolitan Historic Structures Association, a group of organizations that maintained the Dyckman House and the city's other historic house museums, was raising funds to maintain the house by 1985. At the time, the rooms were dusty, and the furniture was in shabby condition, though the house was free to visit. The house's interior was renovated two years later, at which point it charged an admission fee. The Dyckman House was one of the founding members of the Historic House Trust, established in 1989. The trust issued booklets with stamps to encourage visitation to these houses; for the Dyckman House, the trust created a stamp depicting one of the house's pots. Starting the same year, the house was included in Historic House Festivals of the city's historic house museums.

Henry continued to care for the house through the 1990s. The house closed in 2003 for a major restoration involving Preservation Volunteers, a cultural exchange program where French and American volunteers restored buildings in each other's countries. The Dyckman House reopened to the public two years later. The restoration, costing $1 million, included repainting, upgrades to mechanical systems, new lighting, and restoration of both the facade and the interior. Work on the house was completed by December 2006, followed the next year by restoration of the grounds. By then, the parlor, the dining room, and the Dyckman office on the first floor were open to the public. The house was closed for another renovation in 2015, reopening that June after six months. By then, the house had switched to pay what you wish admission.

During the COVID-19 pandemic in 2020, the museum hosted virtual programs; it closed in March and reopened that October. In late 2021, the Dyckman Farmhouse Museum Alliance announced another renovation; the project included wheelchair-accessible features, such as ramps, to bring the house into compliance with the Americans with Disabilities Act of 1990. John G. Waite Associates was hired to design the renovation, which also included the restoration of a two-story annex demolished in the 1920s.

== Architecture ==
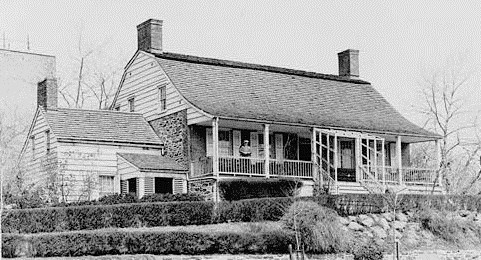
Historic American Buildings Survey photo from 1934. The original, gable-roofed main house is visible at left. The addition is seen at right.

The house is not only the oldest remaining farmhouse in Manhattan but also the only one in the Dutch Colonial style and the oldest remaining 18th-century farmhouse in the borough. The Dyckman House, along with Hamilton Grange National Memorial and the Morris–Jumel Mansion, is among several houses in Upper Manhattan that remain from the United States' early history.

The entrance is accessed by a brick path, while boxwood hedges and gravel walkways are placed across the rest of the site. The grounds around the house contain numerous plantings, including a beech tree in the backyard. The back of the house contains a preserved hut once used by Hessian soldiers. This hut measured about 10 feet (3.0 m) tall and 12 feet (3.7 m) long, with a low front door, small windows, and a chimney. When the house was converted to a museum, there was a fieldstone smokehouse on the grounds. There was also a surviving cherry tree from the original estate.

=== Exterior ===
The Dyckman House is an early example of a gambrel-roofed house in New York City. The current two-story house has a facade of fieldstone, brick, and white clapboard. The front (south) wall is made of brick, while the remaining walls are made of fieldstone. The rear (north) wall is covered with stucco and sits atop a fieldstone ledge. On the second story, the west and east walls are covered with clapboard panels. The eaves of the Dyckman House's gambrel roof are supported by narrow columns. The roof itself is curved, in contrast to the straight roofs of other homes. In addition, there are doorways of different heights, off-center windows, and clapboard panels with exposed edges. The dormer windows on the second floor were added some time after the house was completed.

There are porches along the front and rear of the main building, with square columns and wooden floors. The porches are typical of the Dutch Colonial style but were added in 1825. There are entrances on both the front and rear elevations of the house. Both entrances retain double doors topped by transom windows. The main entrance is through a short staircase to the front porch. At the south end of the site is a smaller wing which predates the main structure. The structure is covered by a gable roof (which slopes down on one side). There is a shed roof above the wing's entrance, next to the main building. A National Park Service report indicates that the wing was either part of the original main house or was part of a freestanding servant's quarters or kitchen.

=== Interior ===
There are 14 rooms within the Dyckman House. In general, the rooms have low ceilings to retain heat, and they were designed in a simple manner. The rooms have floors of varying-width chestnut wood. In the basement is an indoor winter kitchen. The winter kitchen has a fireplace, heat from which was used to heat the first floor during the Dyckman family's occupancy. The basement contains a dining area. This level is accessed by a narrow stairway at the rear of the first-floor living room, which is built into part of a preexisting Inwood granite outcropping. Under the stairway is a granite outcropping, into which is carved a game board for nine men's morris, a colonial American board game.

The main house's first story, known as the parlor floor, has a hall and four rooms. Fireplaces are located at either end of the house, and a hallway cuts through the house from the front to the rear. The main entrance leads to a parlor. To the right or north of the parlor is the former office of William Dyckman, as well as an adjacent bedroom. A central stairway at the rear of the hall leads up to the second story. There is a dining room on the left (south) wall and a sitting room behind the dining room. A hallway on the first floor, covered with louvers, leads to the smaller wing, which contains an outdoor smokehouse and summer kitchen. By the 1980s, the summer kitchen abutted a one-bedroom apartment used by the house's caretaker. At some point in the house's history, the summer kitchen was downsized, and a breakfast alcove was built within that space.

The second story is known as the bedroom floor. The main house's second story has a hall leading to two servants' bedrooms, as well as five additional rooms. The wing's second story, accessed by a smaller stairway, has two rooms and was originally used as a loft. By the late 20th century, the second floor was divided into a parlor, a storage room, and two bedrooms. A garret, or attic, provides additional storage and could be accessed by a ladder from the first floor.

== Operation ==
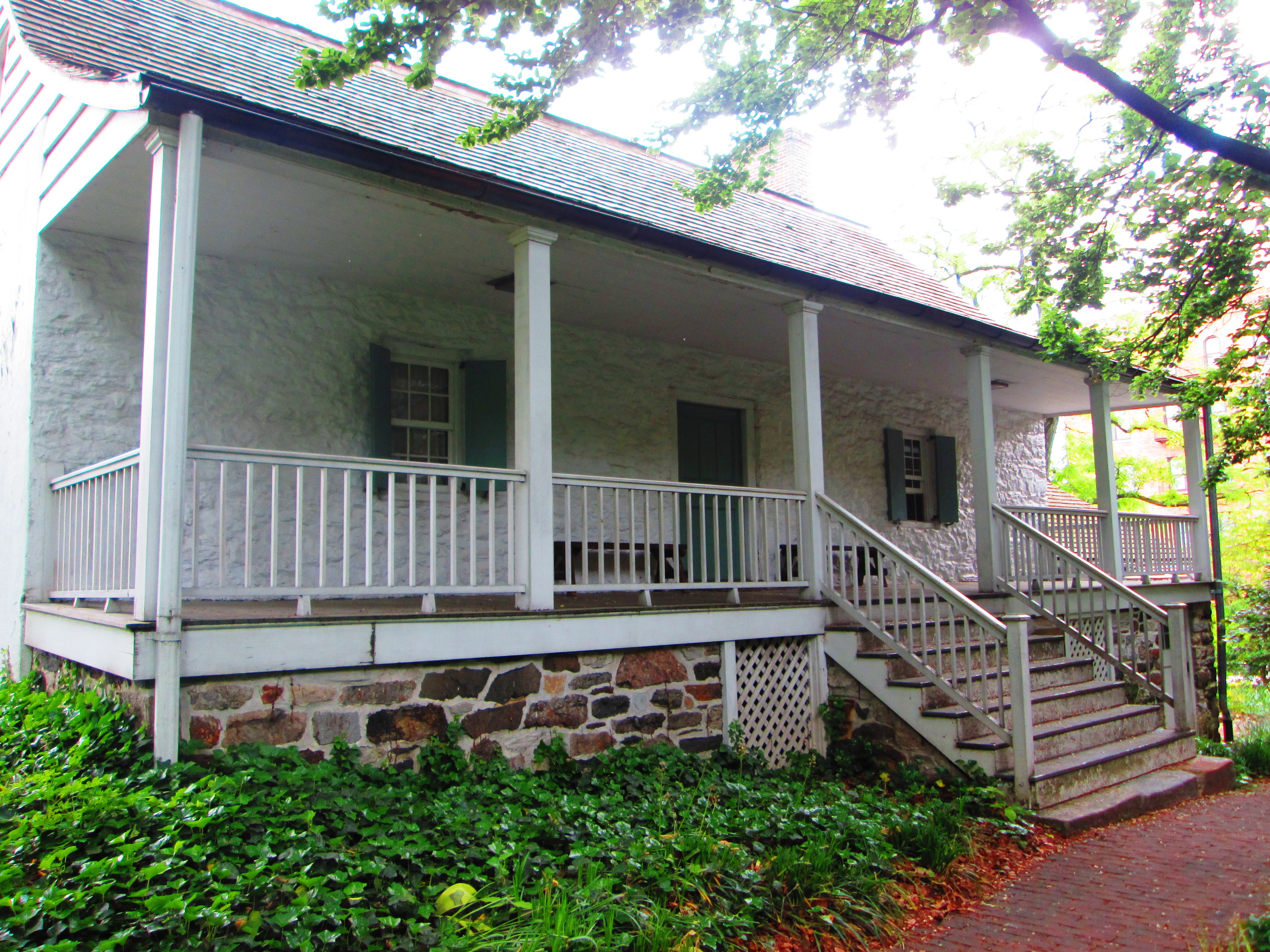
Rear porch

As of 2026, the museum is led by Melissa Kiewiet. When the museum opened in 1916, some Revolutionary and Native American artifacts were displayed in one room of the house, while a military hut was displayed in the backyard. Pieces of Dyckman family furniture were exhibited in other rooms, in addition to silverware, objects for fireplaces, and clothing. The house also displayed objects such as the family's Dutch Bible, a cradle, and a pair of glasses, all accompanied by typewritten labels. By the 1960s and 1970s, the kitchen displayed utensils such as frying pans, coffee roasters, waffle irons, and a central table with plates. One of the rooms had Revolutionary-era artifacts including pottery, utensils, bottles, shoe spurs and buckles, buttons, silverware, cannonballs, and fragments of pottery. The furniture on display was designed in both the English and Dutch colonial styles. Other exhibits included a piece of the original lath wall, a photograph of the house, and an ice skate made of iron and wood.

The house's collection was expanded in the 1970s. The objects included a round "rent table" marked with former tenants' initials; a "state table" from Bashford Dean, which was used during family funerals as a coffin base; a set of Chippendale chairs donated by Samuel Morse's father; and high beds in the bedrooms. The hut remained on the grounds, as did a well and smokehouse. A 1987 account of the house described the kitchen, bedrooms, and living room as displaying artifacts and that there was still a room dedicated to Revolutionary artifacts. The author Donald Reynolds wrote in 1994 that the house displayed "rush-bottom armchairs"; a desk with a foldable front section; wing chairs around hearths; canopied beds; and rugs on the wooden floors. Some of the furniture on display, such as the rugs and wing chairs, had been used by the Dyckman family to regulate temperature prior to the advent of mechanical heating.

The house also hosts various temporary exhibits. For example, in 2020, the museum hosted an exhibition on the house's history and connections with slavery. Over the years, it has hosted events such as Christmas carols, virtual history tours, and fairy-tale readings.

== Impact and legacy ==
=== Reception ===
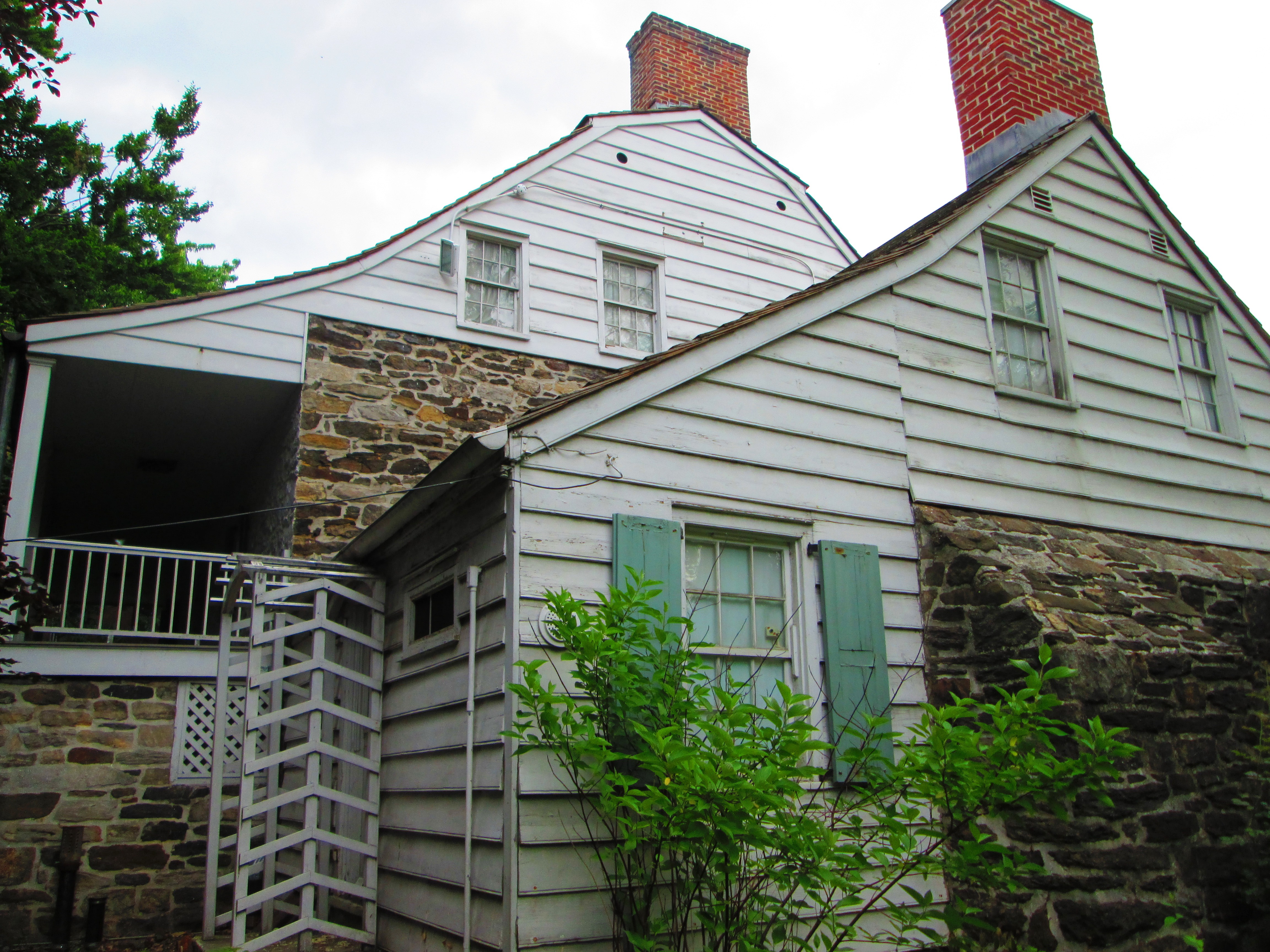
West end of the house, seen from the rear

When the house was being converted to a museum, the New-York Tribune wrote that, despite its long history, "its oak floors show little trace of wear and the old oak hand-hewn beams are as solid as ever". The Times wrote that the house's history as a Dutch homestead was "visibly exemplified in its architecture and in its suggestiveness of homely, simple hospitality and family comforts". After the museum opened, a writer for The American Architect called the structure "a good example of the type of house that the early Dutch settler on Manhattan Island and across the Hudson in New Jersey so much affected". Women's Wear called the museum "a splendid historic memorial of a life that has unhappily passed away", and a Times writer from 1935 considered the house a relic of the neighborhood's Revolutionary days. Yet another critic, writing in 1930, said the use of plaster, brick, clapboard, and stone added "interest to the whole without intruding too far into the limelight".

In the 1950s, a writer for the Oneonta Star said that the house was overshadowed by a neighboring apartment house, "but in no way does it seem to awe the little colonial". The Globe and Mail wrote in 1968 that the house's Dutch colonial style contrasted with "the elegance of Jumel Mansion". One reporter for The New York Times said in 1977 that the house "approaches its 200th year with rare grace", even though apartment buildings covered the remaining farmland, while another writer for the same paper described the Dyckman House as "more homey" compared with the Jumel Mansion, which had been intended for a wealthier family. The Daily Telegraph wrote in 1998 that the house was a quaint building "wedged inconspicuously between modern apartment blocks".

During the 1980s, Good Housekeeping magazine called the house "the sole remembrance of Manhattan's bucolic past", and The News-Times of Danbury, Connecticut, wrote that the house's existence "represent[ed] the struggles that its inhabitants had to undergo for mere existence". The Washington Post, writing in 1992, called the house "a little world of small, simple rooms furnished with 18th- and 19th-century pieces". The Times wrote in 2018 that the house was "a magical stop on Broadway's least-discovered northern stretch", and KABC-TV said in 2026 that the house "remains an unexpected reminder of Manhattan's rural roots and Revolutionary War history".

=== Preservation and media ===
The Dyckman House's historical importance had been recognized as early as 1914, when the New York City Art Commission took pictures of the house and other notable sites across the city; at the time, cameras were still relatively uncommon. The Municipal Art Society and the Society of Architects' New York chapter described the house in 1952 as one of 20 buildings in the city that should "be preserved at all costs". The New York Community Trust installed a plaque on the building in 1959, acknowledging its architectural and historical significance. The New York City Landmarks Preservation Commission (LPC) designated the house as a city landmark in July 1967, a status that was finalized the next month. The house was designated as a National Historic Landmark (NHL) that December. In granting the NHL designation, the National Park Service described the house as "an example of the final refinements of the Flemish Colonial style during the late 18th century".

The Dyckman House was depicted in a book of sketches that was gifted to the Museum of the City of New York in 1932, and an exhibit of the house was displayed at that museum the next year. The house's design also inspired that of a mid-1930s house in New Jersey. In the 1950s, Dorothy and Richard Platt included images of the Dyckman House in a guidebook of historical structures in New York City. The Dyckman House was featured in Bob Vila's A&E Network production Guide to Historic Homes of America. The house's Dutch Colonial architecture—particularly its facade materials, gambrel roof, porches, and chimneys—specifically inspired a similar house near Nashville, Tennessee.

== See also ==
- List of National Historic Landmarks in New York City
- List of New York City Designated Landmarks in Manhattan above 110th Street
- National Register of Historic Places listings in Manhattan above 110th Street
