= Theatrical Musical Club =

Trade union in New York City

The Theatrical Musical Club (Yiddish: טעאַטער מיוזיקאַל קלוב) was a musicians' trade union in New York City with a membership consisting mainly of Jewish musicians from the Yiddish theatre. Organized under the United Hebrew Trades in 1897, the union affiliated with the American Federation of Musicians local 310 during the 1910s and then with local 802 in 1922. During the late 1920s, the Club was involved in a corruption scandal, with accusations of kickbacks and monopolization of jobs in Lower East Side Yiddish theaters.

== History ==
The Theatrical Musical Club was founded in Manhattan in November 1897 under the umbrella of the United Hebrew Trades, as a reorganization of an previous Jewish musicians' union called the American Progressive Musical Union. By the turn of the century, the Club affiliated with the Musical Mutual Protective Union, a large musicians' union in New York City, although it kept its independence. The existence of a separate Jewish musicians' union was a source of difficulty for the A.F.M. local in New York, who attempted at various times to reduce the recognition of what they saw as a "dual union" in competition with theirs. During the 1910s, the Club members joined A.F.M. local 310, although they also kept their own organization and attempted to monopolize jobs in the Yiddish Theatre to its members. During this period, a local 310 notable Edward Canavan, who was not Jewish, acted as protector for the Club within the local. When A.F.M. local 310 was reorganized as local 802 in New York in 1922, the Club members were again allowed to join the new local as members.

=== Corruption scandal ===
Alleged corruption perpetrated by members of the Club took place between 1926 and 1928, and were brought before the executive board of the United Hebrew Trades in April 1929 and of the American Federation of Musicians in November 1930. Whistleblowers alleged that the Club was demanding kickbacks from musicians playing jobs in certain Yiddish theaters, and that it had been mainly orchestrated by Edward Canavan, who was by then chairperson of local 802. Canavan's scheme was alleged to have extorted more than $3,500 from theater musicians and paid it out to himself and agents running the theaters, which included notables like Alexander Olshanetsky, Sholom Secunda and Joseph Rumshinsky. He was accused of canceling legitimate contracts between local 802 musicians and Yiddish theaters, and having new contacts made with local 802 members who were also members of the Theatrical Musical Club, who would in turn pay kickbacks to people involved in the scheme.

The UHT's executive committee had local 802 put the Club under outside administration and barred the ringleaders from having dealing with theatres for life. The theater leaders Rumshinsky, Olshanetsky and Secunda were portrayed as unwilling accomplices in this scheme. When it came to local 802's board, it also disciplined members who were found to have been involved, although the local cleared Canavan and said he had been subjected to a "frame-up".

In January 1934, it eventually made its way to a session of the Subcommittee Investigating Racketeering in the United States Senate, where some of the key figures were interviewed on the record. The leadership of local 802 was very hostile to what they saw as an unfair portrayal in the senate hearings; Edward Canavan's career was not harmed by it, and he remained head of the local until 1937. It is unclear how long the Theatrical Musical Club persisted as a distinct group in local 802.
