= Rossleigh Court =

Apartment building in Manhattan, New York

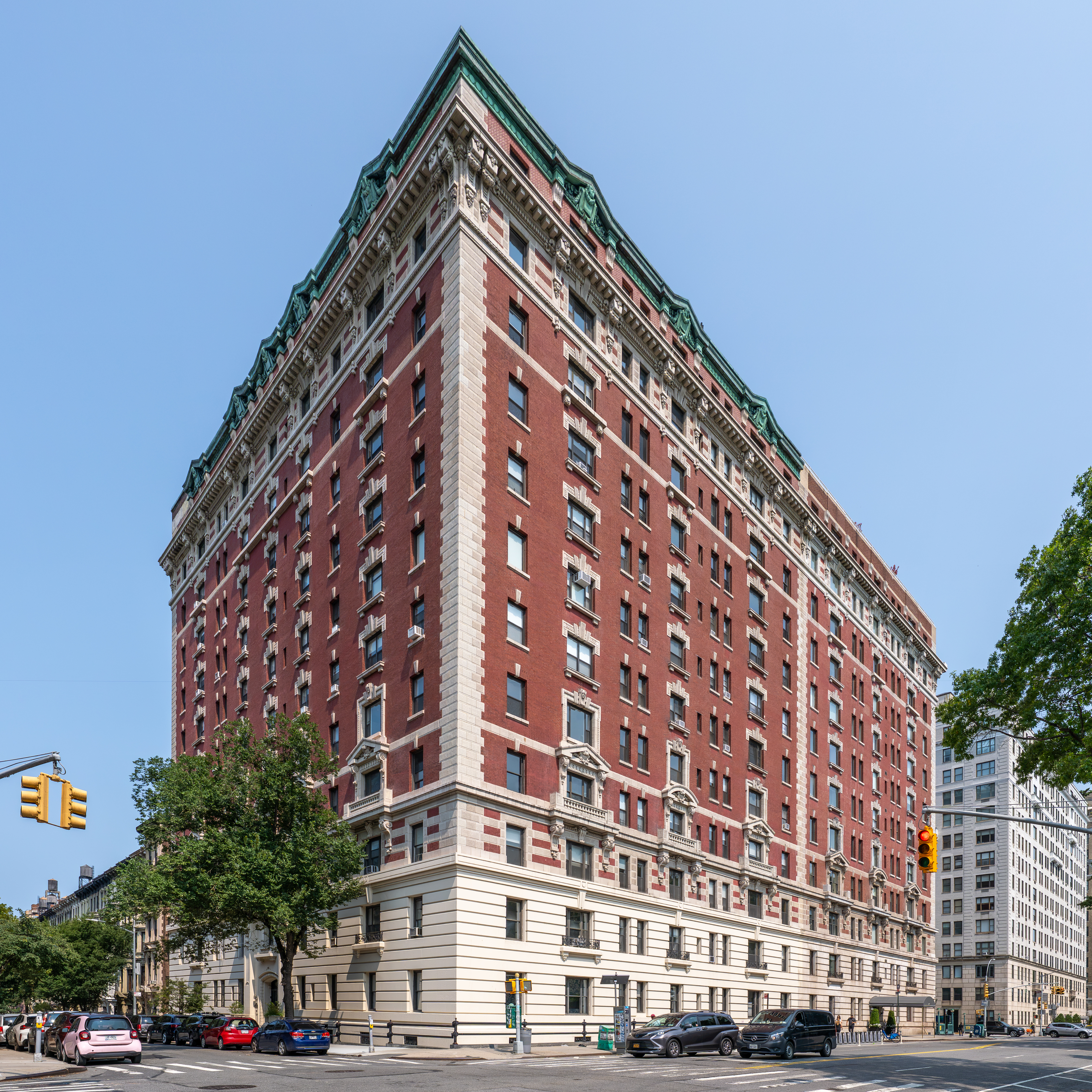
- (2026)

- Location within New York City
- Alternative names: 251 Central Park West; 1 West 85th Street

General information
- Architectural style: Beaux Arts
- Location: Manhattan, New York, United States of America
- Coordinates: 40°47′05″N 73°58′12″W
- Completed: 1907
- Owner: Private

Design and construction
- Architecture firm: Mulliken and Moeller
- Main contractor: Gotham Building & Construction
- Designations: Upper West Side-Central Park West Historic District

Rossleigh Court is a rental apartment building located on the northwest corner of 85th Street and Central Park West on the Upper West Side of Manhattan in New York City.

Like the similarly designed and adjoining building to its north, 257 Central Park West, Rossleigh Court was designed by Mulliken and Moeller and built by Gotham Building and Construction between 1906 and 1907. Opening one year after its "twin" to the north, both buildings followed the popular "French Flat" model in a Beaux-Arts style.
