= 85th Street (Manhattan) =

West-east street in Manhattan, New York

- 85th Street Transverse
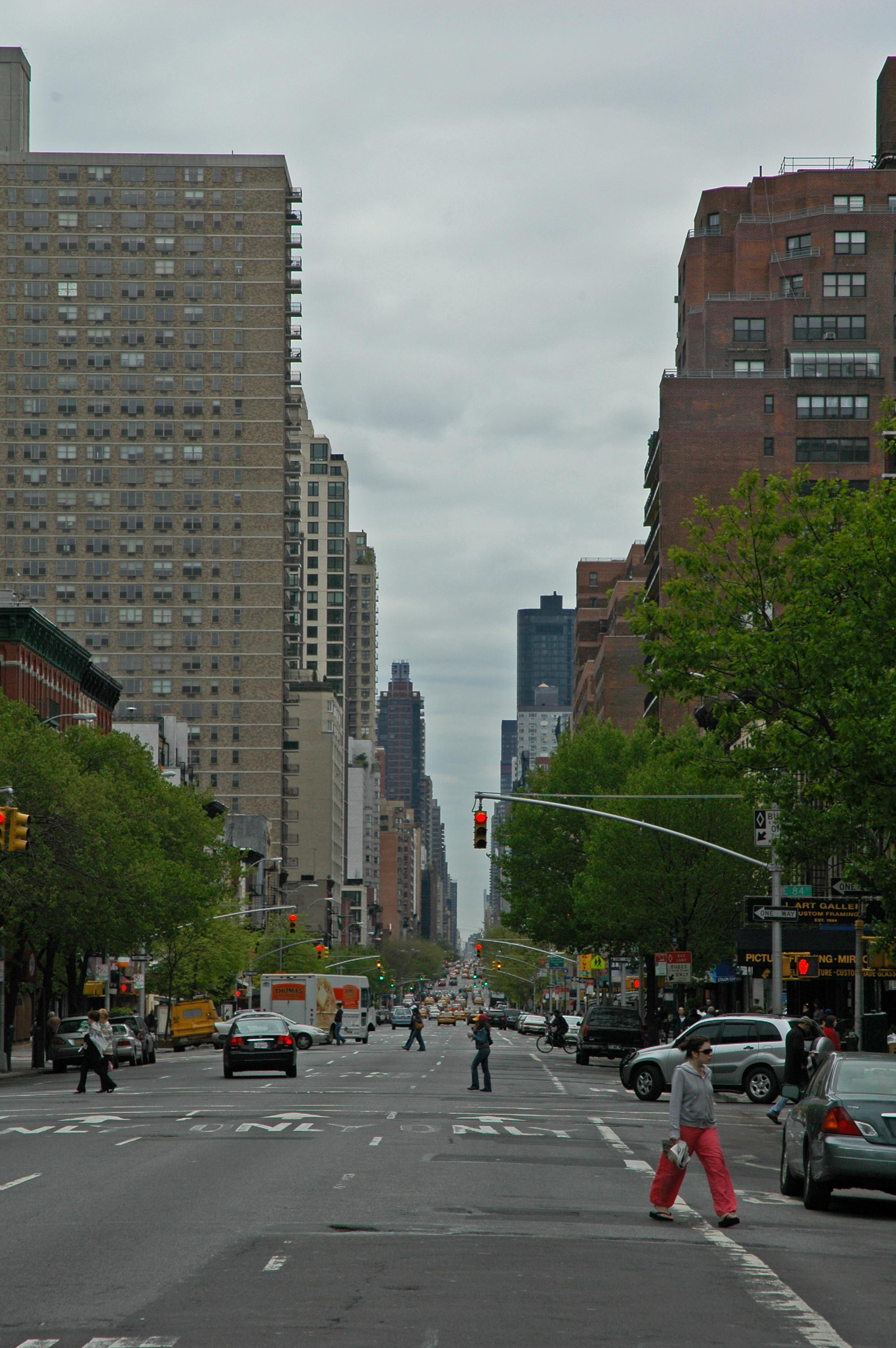
- Looking south on Second Avenue from East 85th Street in 2005
- Maintained by: NYCDOT
- Length: 2.2 mi (3.5 km)
- Width: 60 feet (18.29 m) (west of Central Park West and east of Madison Avenue)
- Location: Manhattan
- Postal code: 10024 (west), 10028 (east)
- Coordinates: 40.7806°N 73.9604°W
- West end: Riverside Drive in Upper West Side
- East end: East End Avenue in Yorkville
- North: 86th Street
- South: 84th Street

Construction
- Commissioned: 1811
- Construction start: 1837

85th Street is a westbound-running street, running from East End Avenue to Riverside Drive in the borough of Manhattan in New York City, United States.

At Fifth Avenue, the street feeds into the 86th Street transverse, which runs east–west through Central Park and heads from the Upper East Side (where it is known as East 85th Street) to West 86th Street on the Upper West Side. West 85th Street resumes one block south of the transverse's western end. It includes landmarks such as the Lewis Gouverneur and Nathalie Bailey Morris House at 100 East 85th Street, the sidewalk clock at East 85th Street and Third Avenue, the Yorkville Bank Building at 201–203 East 85th Street, Red House at 350 West 85th Street, and Regis High School.

== History ==
In 1837, the Board of Aldermen of New York City initially voted not to approve, but subsequently approved, the opening of East 85th Street between Third Avenue and Fifth Avenue, which the Committee on Roads and Canals had offered up as a resolution on the petition of owners of property on the street. In 1839, the Board of Aldermen approved the opening of West 85th Street between Fifth Avenue and Ninth Avenue.

By the 1840s, a short length designated as West 85th Street had been created as a narrow lane east of Eighth Avenue. Most of West 85th Street was laid out following the American Civil War. However, until the 1880s the rate of development on the street was slow. At that time, following an improvement in public transportation, people began to speculate on the property on the street.

In 1971, John Corry of the Times wrote a series of stories about life on West 85th Street between Central Park and Columbus Avenue.

== Transportation ==
No New York City Subway stations are located on the street itself. Several are on nearby 86th Street, however:

- 86th Street on the N, Q, and R trains at Second Avenue
- 86th Street on the 4, 5, 6, and <6> trains at Lexington Avenue
- 86th Street on the 1 and 2 trains at Broadway
- 86th Street on the A, B, and C trains at Central Park West

== Notable places and residents ==
There are several significant landmarks on 85th Street.

=== East Side ===
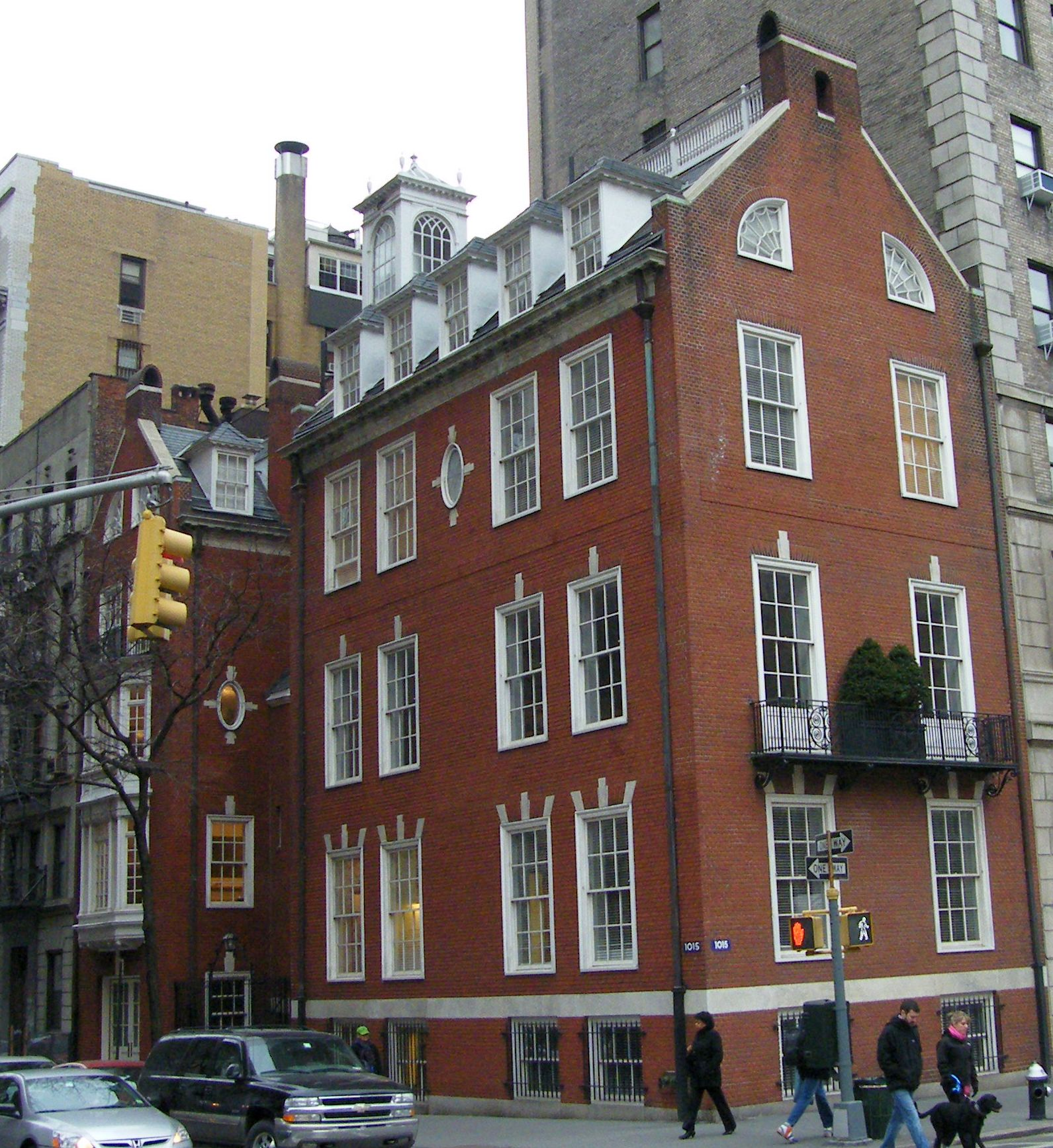
Lewis Gouverneur and Nathalie Bailey Morris House

The building at 100 East 85th Street, originally known as Lewis Gouverneur and Nathalie Bailey Morris House, is a large brick red townhouse that was built in 1913–14 in a neo-Federal style. Its architect was Ernest Flagg. It was designated a landmark by the New York City Landmarks Preservation Commission in 1973, and added to the National Register of Historic Places in 1977.

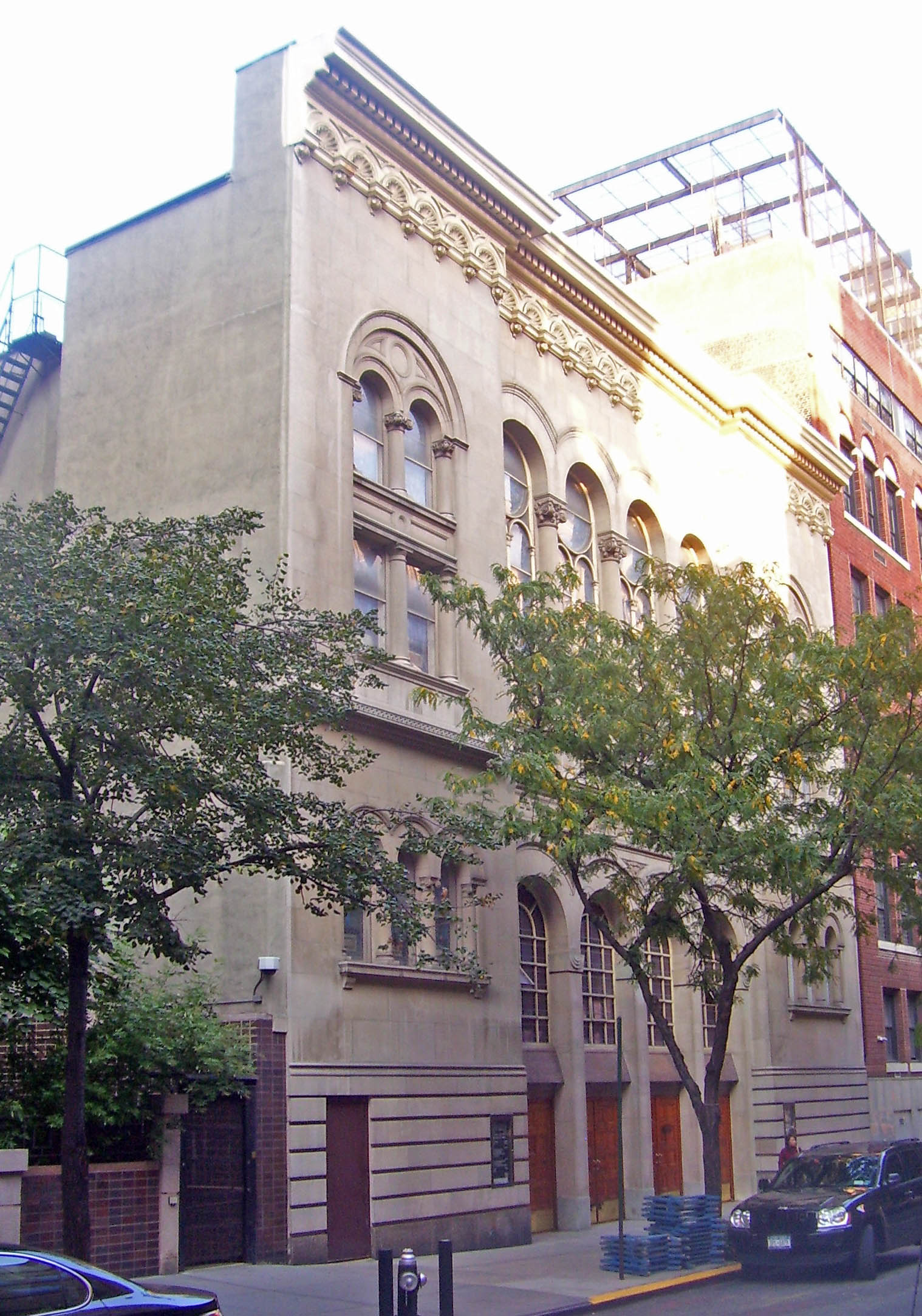
Congregation Kehilath Jeshurun

Congregation Kehilath Jeshurun (originally "Anshe Jeshurun"), a Modern Orthodox synagogue founded by Russian Jewish immigrants in 1872, is located at 125 East 85th Street, between Park Avenue and Lexington Avenue, in a building built in 1902. The lower division of the Ramaz School, a coeducational, private Modern Orthodox Jewish prep school, shares a building with the congregation.

The German American Bund, an American Nazi organization, had its national headquarters at 178 East 85th Street from 1936 through the early 1940s, and occasionally paraded in the neighborhood in Nazi uniforms.

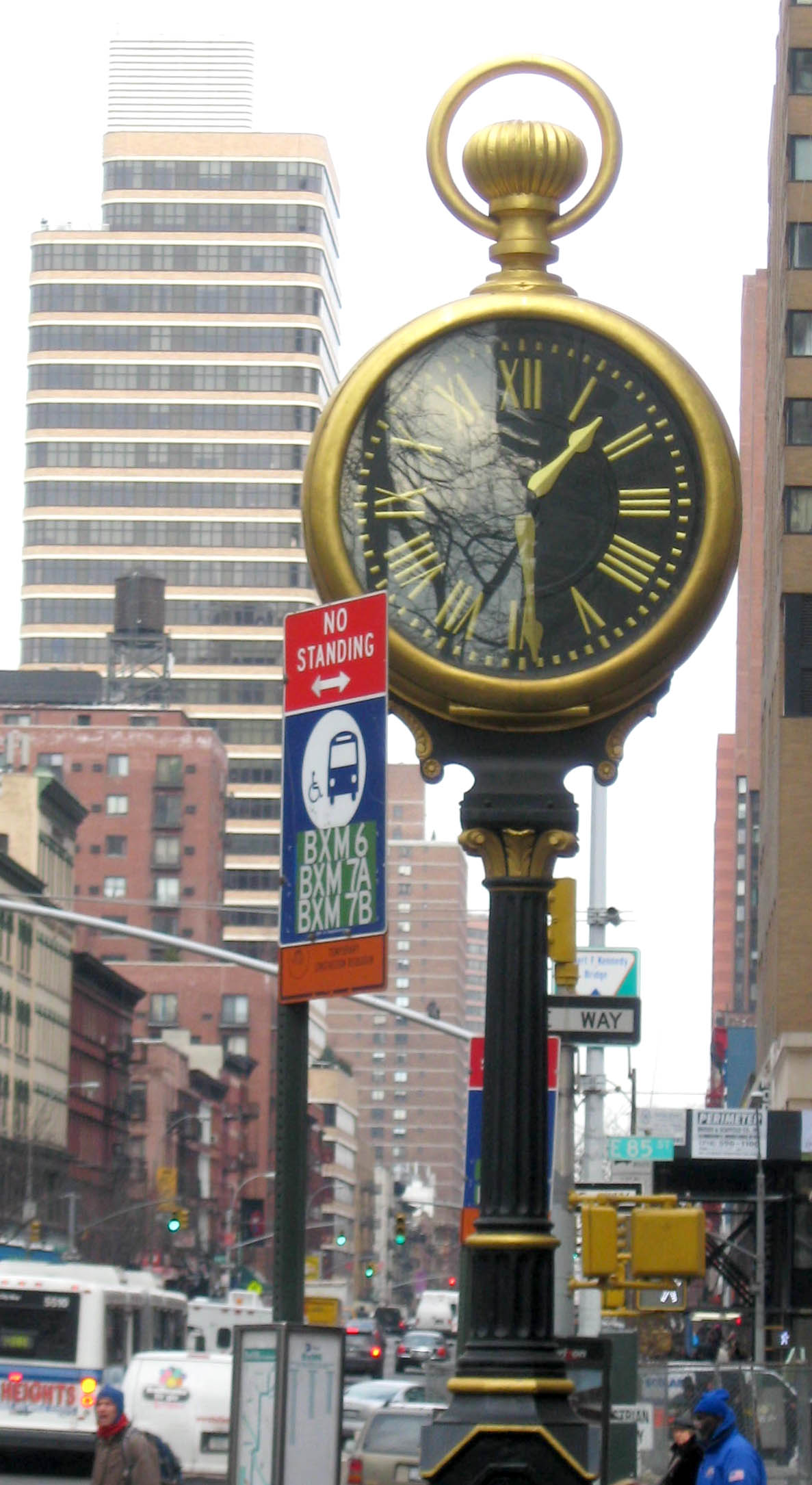
Sidewalk clock at East 85th Street and Third Avenue

Park Lane Tower, the 35-story L-shaped high-rise apartment building shown in the opening credits of the television show The Jeffersons (1975-1985), is located at 185 East 85th Street and Third Avenue. Designed by architect Hyman Isaac Feldman and completed in 1967, the beige-brick structure features distinctive rounded balconies at its corners and angled balconies on its sides.

The sidewalk clock at East 85th Street and Third Avenue, dating from the late 1800s and likely produced by E. Howard & Co., was designated a landmark in 1981. Constructed to resemble a pocket watch, it is 15 feet (4.6 m) high including its base.

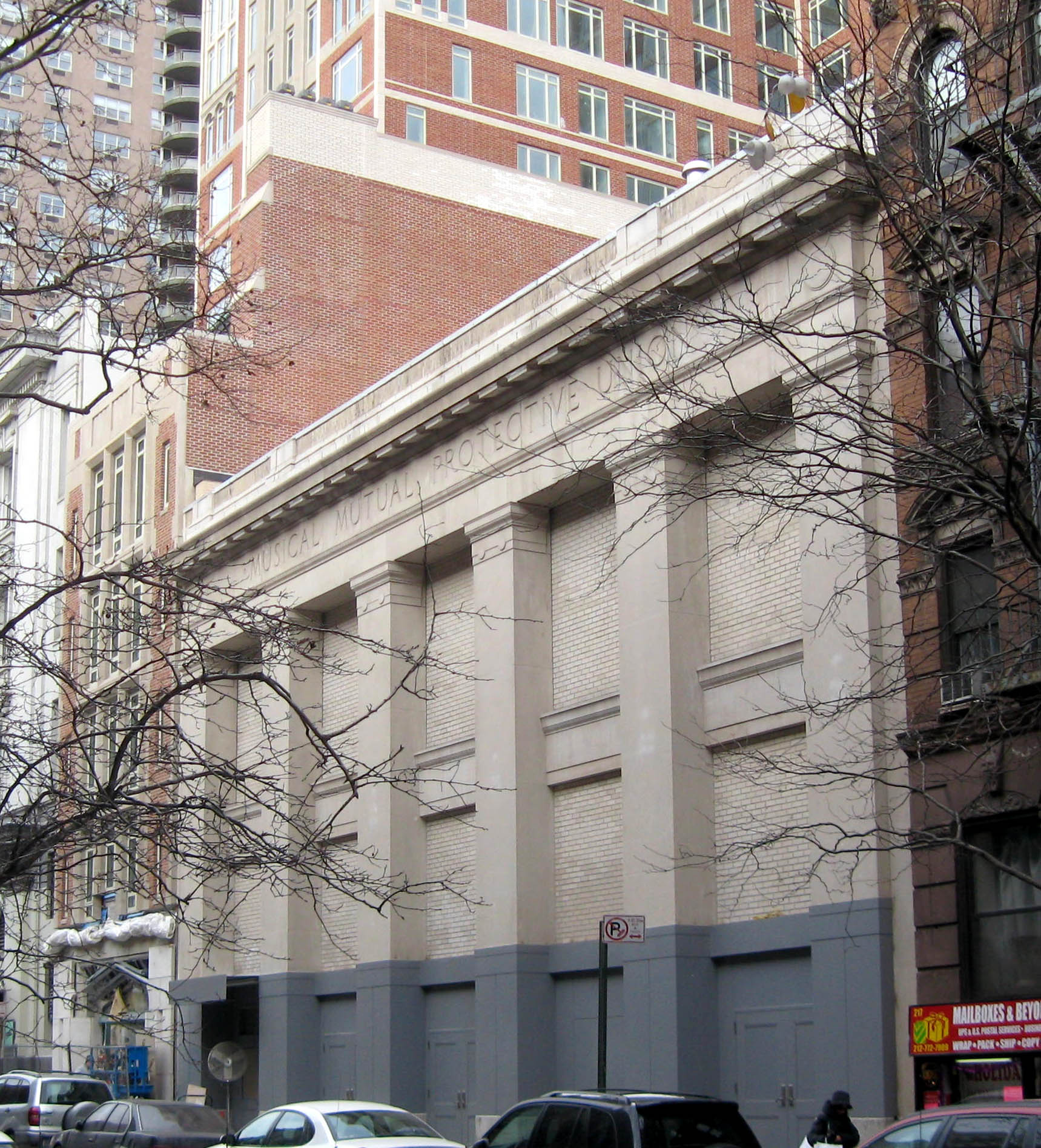
The Musical Mutual Protective Union

At 201–203 East 85th Street, the Yorkville Bank Building (1905), a four-story building designed by Robert Maynicke, was designated a landmark in 2012.

Instrument maker Vincent Bach manufactured trumpets and trumpet mouthpieces at 204 East 85th Street in the early 20th century.

The building at 209 East 85th Street was constructed in 1919 aS the union hall of the Musical Mutual Protective Union.

Minnie Marx and Sam Marx, the parents and manager of the Marx Brothers, lived at 330 East 85th Street.

The clapboard shingle house at 412 East 85th Street was built around 1855. It was restored in 1988 by architect Alfredo De Vido.

Author Henry Miller, who wrote Tropic of Cancer, was born in 1891 on the top floor of and lived at 450 East 85th Street.

Author Louise Fitzhugh lived at 524 East 85th Street, between East End and York Avenues, and her heroine "Harriet" in Harriet the Spy lived in the area.

The glassy Modernist building at 525 East 85th Street was built in 1958. Its architect was Paul Mitarachi.

=== Central Park ===
The 86th Street transverse cuts through Central Park, and is directly below the Jacqueline Kennedy Onassis Reservoir. In the early 1880s, most of the cross-town traffic in the area traveled on it. In 1917, New York Railways ran across the traverse road 0.652 miles (1.049 km) on 85th Street, from Eighth Avenue through Central Park to Madison Avenue.

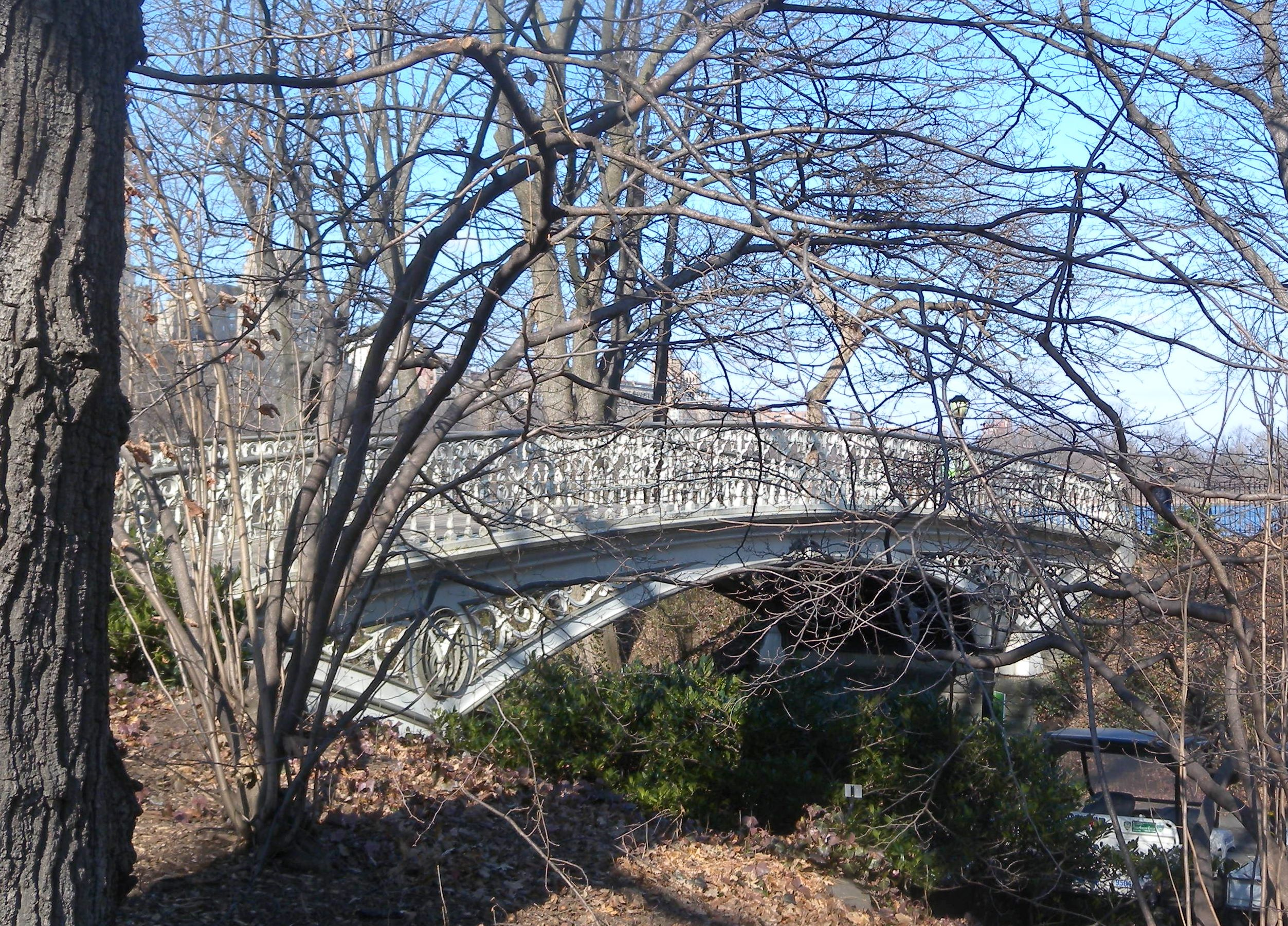
Southwest Reservoir Bridge

Southwest Reservoir Bridge, at 85th Street in Central Park, was designed by Calvert Vaux and is decorated with elegant iron floral scroll ornamentation along its 38 feet (12 m) of railings and spandrels.

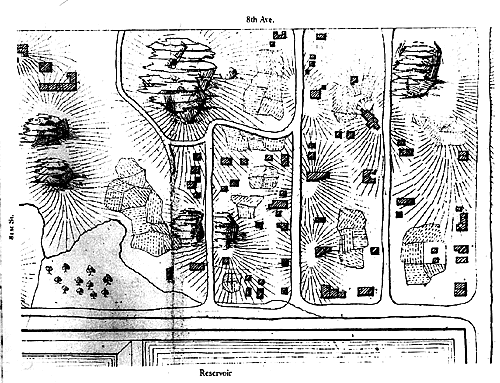
Map of Seneca Village (Egbert Viele, circa 1857)

The site of Seneca Village is in Central Park near West 85th Street. The three lots on which the village was established were purchased in 1825 by Andrew Williams for $125 ($3,600 in current dollar terms), and sold by him to the City of New York three decades later for $2,335 ($80,700 in current dollar terms). In the mid-19th century it was a shanty-town, and it may have been populated by free blacks in the early 1800s. The African Methodist Episcopal Zion Church was at this location.

The Spector Playground is located in Central Park near West 85th Street.

Mariners' Gate is at Central Park and West 85th Street, at an entrance to the park. The name for the gate was chosen as reflecting one of the types of people it was expected would be enjoying the park, at the time the park was built.

=== West Side ===
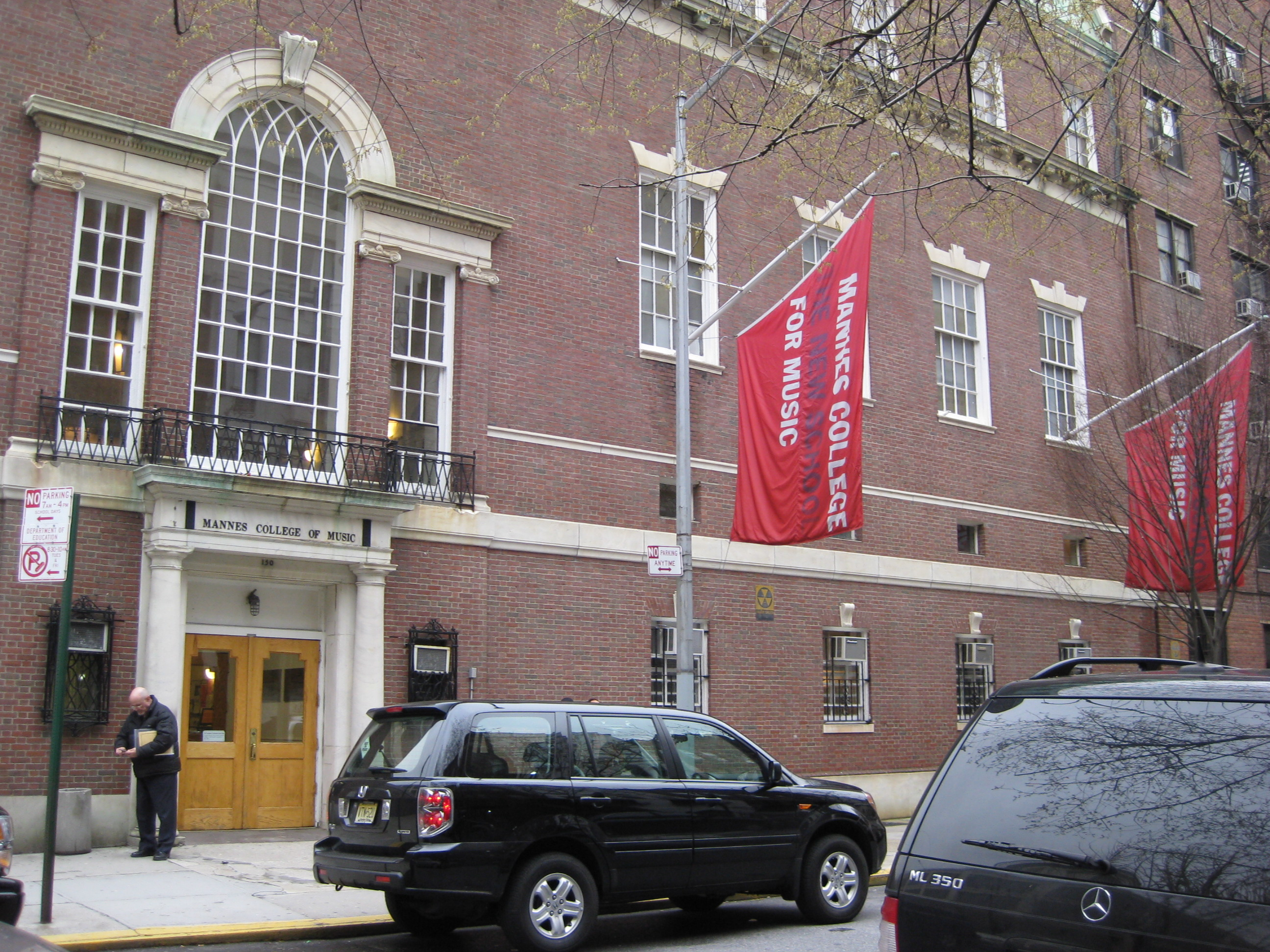
Mannes College of Music

Rossleigh Court at 1 West 85th Street, constructed between 1906 and 1907, was designed by Mulliken and Moeller and built by Gotham Building and Construction. It followed the popular "French Flat" model in a Beaux-Arts style. Novelist Ellen Glasgow lived in the building for a few months every year in the early 20th century.

44 West 85th Street was the location of the Nippon Club of New York City, a private social club founded in 1905 by Jōkichi Takamine for Japanese Americans and Japanese nationals, in the early 20th century.

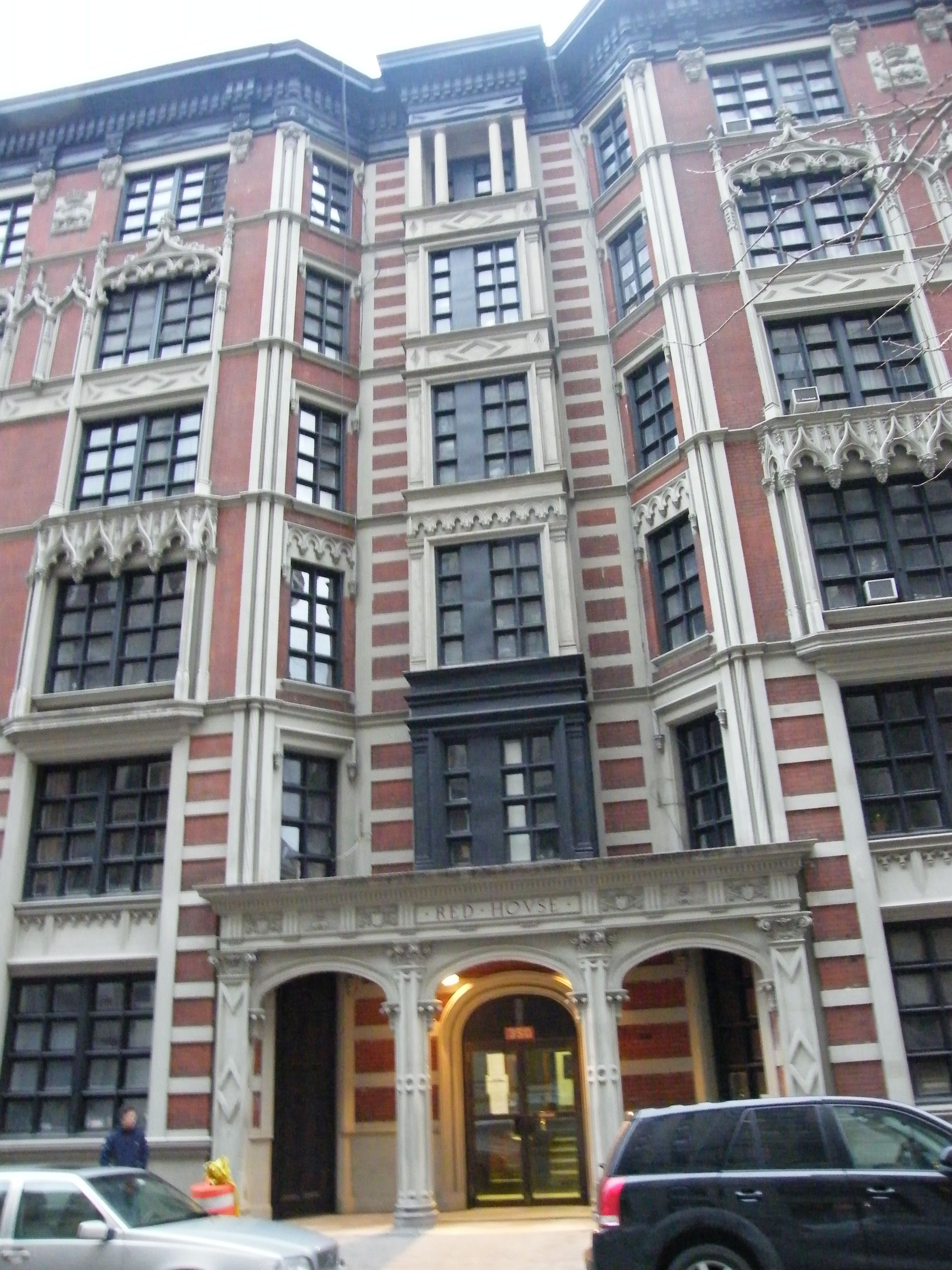
Red House

At 140 West 85th Street, a Dawn Redwood (metasequoia glyptostroboides) endangered coniferous tree can be seen.

Mannes College of Music is a music school located at 150 West 85th Street, which moved there in 1984 seeking larger quarters.

329, 331, 333, 335, and 337 West 85th Street were built in 1890–91. They are brownstone and brick Queen Anne-Romanesque Revival architecture. Journalist Heywood Broun and feminist Ruth Hale lived at 333 West 85th Street.

On the corner of West 85th Street and West End Avenue, a Japanese Maple (acer palmatum) species of woody plant can be seen.

Red House at 350 West 85th Street, between West End Avenue and Riverside Drive, was built in 1903–04, and the six-story French Renaissance/Gothic building was designated a landmark in 1982. It was one of the first apartment buildings in the area, supplanting the earlier row houses. Writer Dorothy Parker lived here at one time.
