= Yorkville Bank Building =

Bank building in Manhattan, New York

Coordinates: 40.7781°N 73.9540°W

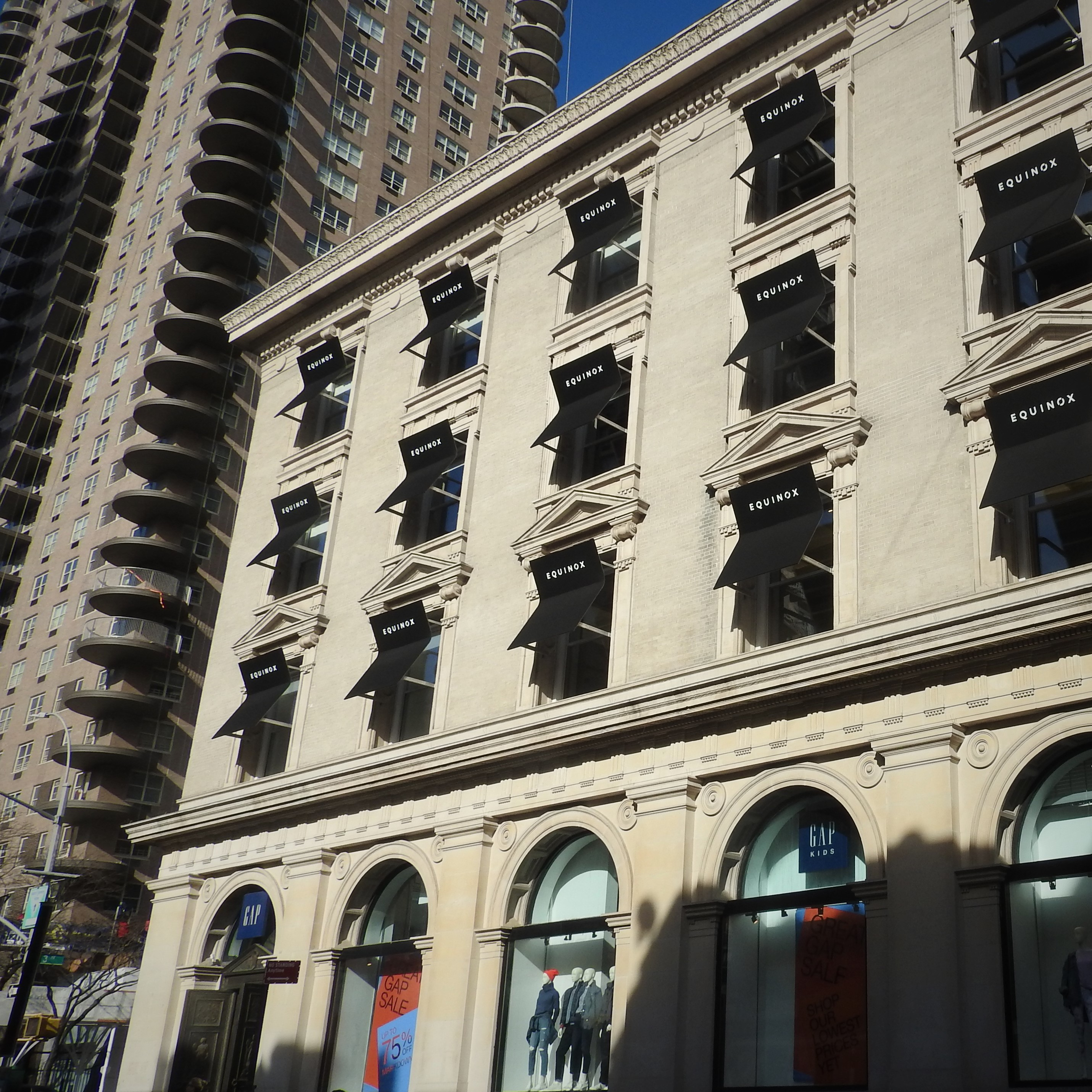
The Yorkville Bank Building's facade

The Yorkville Bank Building is a structure at 201–203 East 85th Street, 1511–1515 Third Avenue on the Upper East Side of Manhattan in New York City. Designed by Robert Maynicke in the Renaissance Revival style, it was built for the Yorkville Bank in 1905 and was designated a landmark by the New York City Landmarks Preservation Commission in 2012.

The building was operated as a bank until 1991, when it was converted to retail space on its ground floor and a fitness center on its upper floors.

== See also ==
- List of New York City Designated Landmarks in Manhattan from 59th to 110th Streets
- National Register of Historic Places listings in Manhattan from 59th to 110th Streets
