= Edgar J. Moeller =

American architect

- Born: Edgar Joachim Moeller; November 7, 1873; New York City
- Died: May 26, 1954 (aged 80); New York City
- Education: Columbia University
- Occupation: Architect
- Buildings: Bretton Hall; 257 Central Park West; Rossleigh Court; The Hotel Lucerne; The Woodstock Hotel; The Jermyn Hotel; The Carlyle and Sterling Apartments; The Van Dyck and Severn Apartments; Schwarzenbach buildings The Runoia

Edgar Joachim Moeller (November 7, 1873 – May 26, 1954) was an early twentieth-century American architect who partnered with Harry Mulliken to build several apartment hotels in New York City. The partnership's Beaux-Arts style is distinguishable and makes a similarly broad use of architectural terra cotta set around flat (and often red) brick.

Born in New York in 1874, Moeller graduated from Columbia University's School of Arts with a Bachelor of Philosophy, course in Architecture, in 1895. Although two years younger, Moeller graduated in the same class as his future partner with whom he joined around 1902. Moeller later was elected head of the Columbia Alumni Federation in 1921 and re-elected in the following year. He was also a member of the Board of Governors of the Columbia University Club, the Real Estate Board of New York, the New York Athletic Club, the Norwalk Yacht Club, and the St. George's Snowshoe Club of Montreal.

His parents were of German ancestry and both the 1900 and 1930 census revealed he was unmarried but living in Manhattan with his two younger and also unmarried sisters, Hildegard and Selma. His profession was listed already as architect in 1900. Although he moved to East 84th Street by the 1930 census, his 1917 draft registration card shows him living at 319 West 75th Street, very near to the location where his and his partner's projects were concentrated.

Moeller's professional career began its notoriety with the formation of his partnership with his Columbia classmate, Harry B. Mulliken. The partnership, known as Mulliken and Moeller, was very active in the first decade and then is mentioned far less in historical sources.

Moeller however practiced his profession in New York City for over fifty years, with an office on Madison Avenue during the 1940s. He died in 1954 in his home at the age of 80 and is buried in Greenwood Cemetery, Brooklyn.

== Selected works ==
- Bretton Hall Hotel (1903) - Mulliken and Moeller as architect. 2350 Broadway, from 85th to 86th Streets.
- Hotel Lucerne (1903–04), - designated as either Mulliken independently or Mulliken and Moeller as architect by different sources. Amsterdam Avenue and 79th Street.
- The Woodstock (1903–06, renovated and expanded in 1912) – Mulliken and Mueller as architect. 127 West 43rd Street.
- The Jermyn Hotel (1904, razed in 1964) – Mulliken and Mueller as architect. Broadway at 61st Street. Also known as the Pasadena and later as the Midtown Hotel.
- Spencer Arms Hotel (1904–05) - Mulliken and Moeller as architect, 2020-2026 Broadway, a.k.a. 147-149 West 69th Street.
- The Carlyle And Sterling Apartments (1905–06) - Mulliken and Moeller as architect, 521-527 Columbus Avenue and 529-535 Columbus Avenue.
- The Van Dyck and Severn Apartments (1905–07 and 1905–06) - Mulliken and Moeller as architect, 269-275 Amsterdam Avenue.
- The Central Park View (1905–06) – Mulliken and Moeller as architect, currently 257 Central Park West or 2 West 86th Street.
- Rossleigh Court (1906–07) - Mulliken and Moeller as architect, currently 251 Central Park West or 1 West 85thStreet.
- The Chepstow (1907) - Mulliken and Moeller as architect, 2660 Broadway.
- The Sexton (1911–12) - Mulliken and Moeller as architect, 530 West End Avenue, the corner of West End Avenue and 86thStreet.
- Schwarzenbach buildings (1912) – Mulliken and Moeller as architect, 470 Park Avenue South (from 31st Street to 32nd Street).
- The Runoia (1915) - Mulliken and Moeller as architect, 267 West 89th Street.
