= Harry B. Mulliken =

American architect (1872–1952)

- Born: Harry Burritt Mulliken; June 10, 1872; Sterling, Illinois, US
- Died: June 20, 1952 (aged 80); Pelham, New York, US
- Education: Columbia University
- Occupation: Architect
- Buildings: Madison Court Apartments; The Aberdeen Hotel; Bretton Hall; 257 Central Park West; Rossleigh Court; The Iroquois Hotel; The Hotel Lucerne; Hotel Cumberland; The Jermyn Hotel; The Hotel St. James; The Carlyle and Sterling Apartments; The Van Dyck and Severn Apartments; Schwarzenbach buildings The Runoia; Ameritania Hotel

Harry B. Mulliken (June 10, 1872 – June 20, 1952) was an early twentieth-century American architect and developer who built many of his works in New York City. Mulliken's apartment and hotel buildings are remarkable for their Beaux-Arts-style and broad use of architectural terra cotta set around flat, and often red, brick.

== Biography ==
Born in Sterling, Illinois in 1872, Mulliken graduated from Columbia University's School of Arts with a Bachelor of Philosophy, course in Architecture, in 1895. He graduated with his future partner, Edgar J. Moeller, although their formal partnership did not begin for another seven years.

In a passport application submitted in 1894 as a student from New York City, Mulliken listed his permanent residence as Detroit, Michigan and his attributes as 6’1” in height, blue eyes, brown hair, a high forehead, a straight nose, a small mouth, heavy chin, and fair complexion.

In another passport application submitted in 1896, Mulliken listed his new permanent residence as Chicago, Illinois and he had recently married Ellen C. Emerson (née December 23, 1872) of Stillwater, Minnesota in January 1896. He also records his new occupation as architect.

Mulliken professionally began his working career in the employment of the Chicago architect Daniel H. Burnham (1895–1896) and later the New York architect Ernest Flagg (1897).

Mulliken opened an office with Edwin E. Pruitt in July 1899 at 289 Fourth Avenue.

Mulliken appears as a Lead Architect in 1900, designing properties under his name alone. Then, Mulliken and Edgar J. Moeller created the partnership for which each is better known, Mulliken & Moeller, in 1902.

After their return to New York, Mulliken, his wife, and four children eventually moved to Pelham, New York where he and his wife would remain throughout his known life. He died in his home in Pelham at the age of 80, three years after his retirement.

== Selected works ==
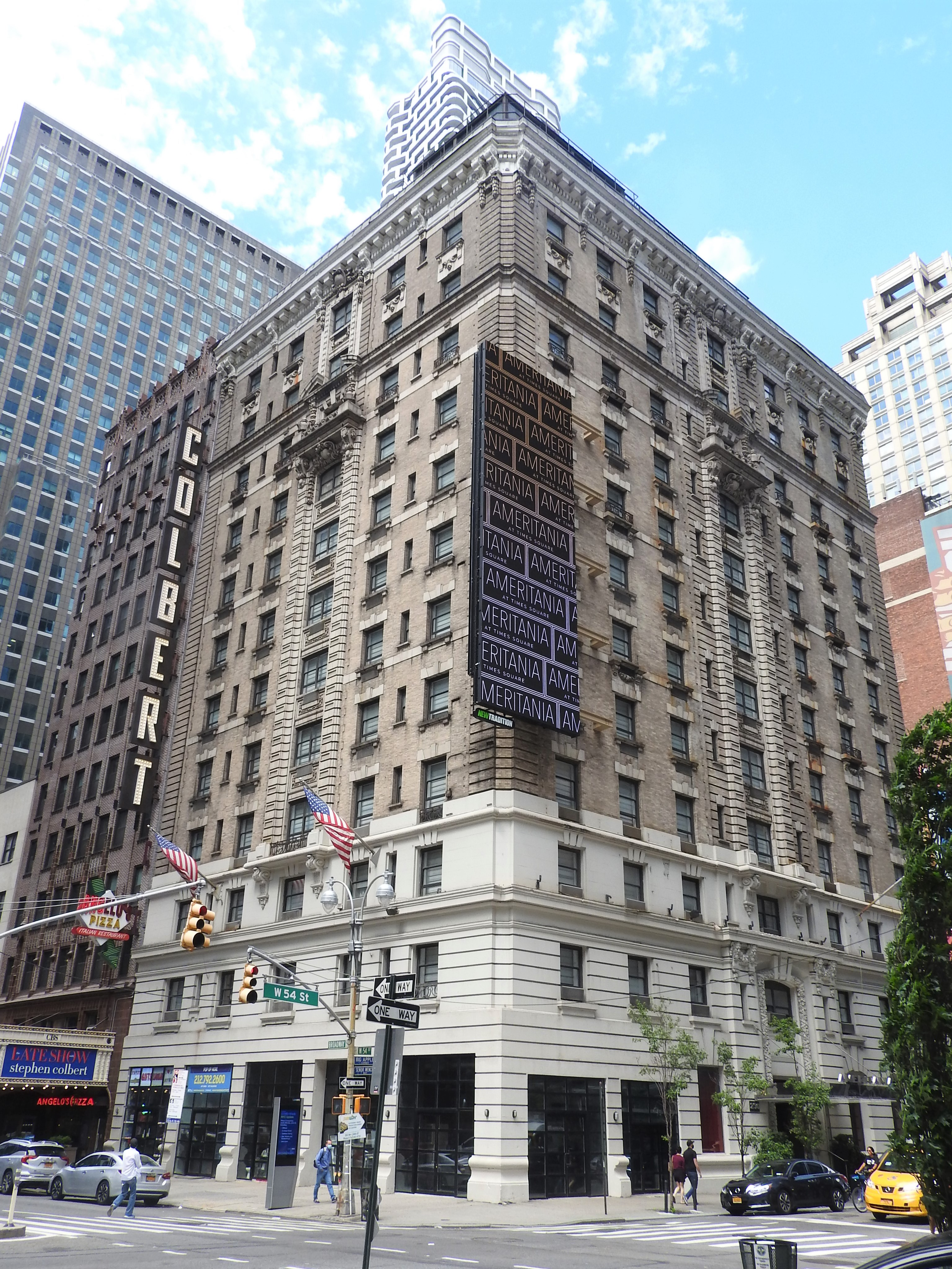
Ameritania Hotel

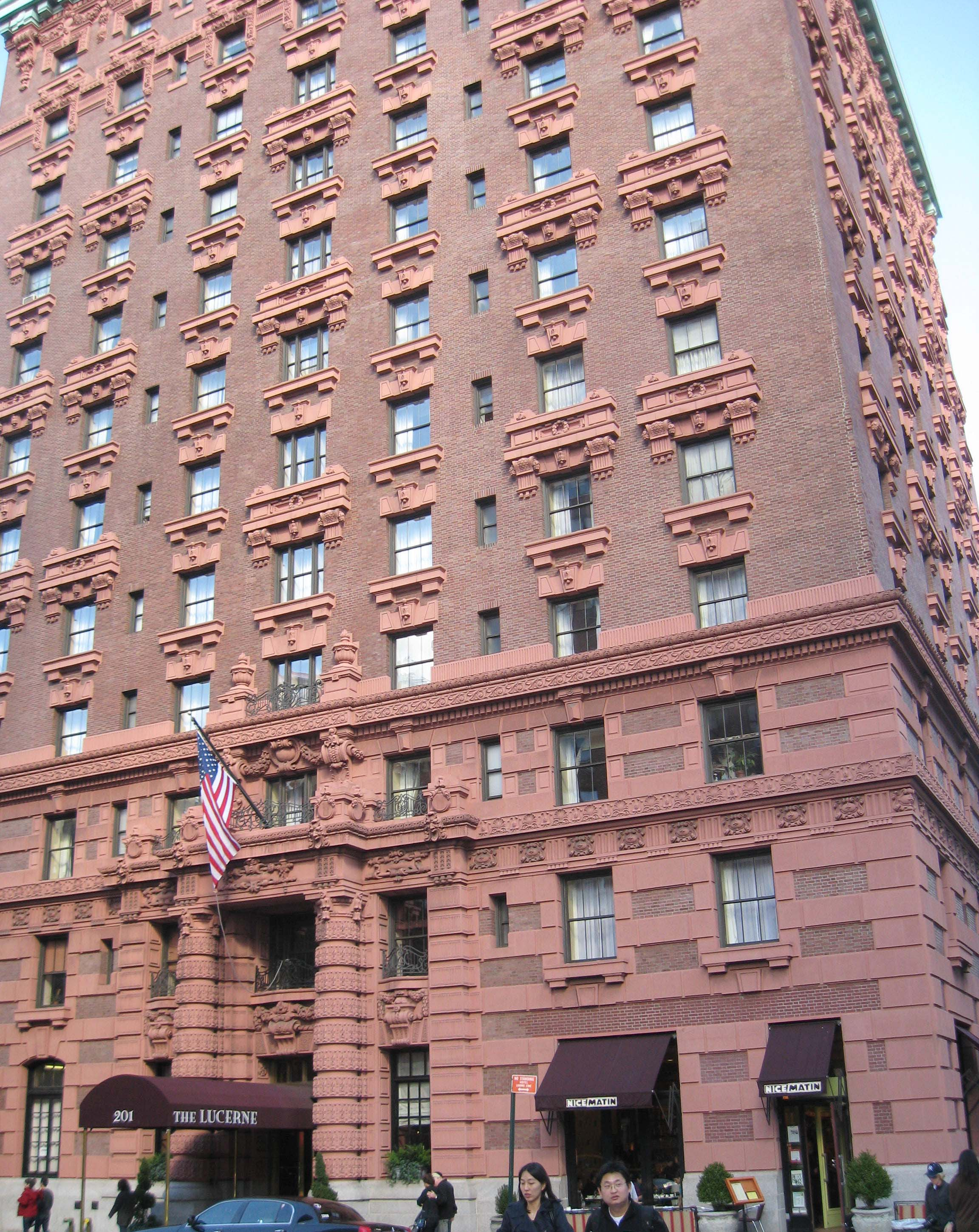
Lucerne Hotel, later Lucerne Apartments

- Madison Court Apartments (1900–1901): Mulliken as architect. 1361 Madison Avenue, aka 51 East 95th Street. Carnegie Hill landmark designation.40.78668°N 73.95425°W
- The Saint Hubert Apartments (1900–02, razed in 2009): Mulliken as architect. 120 West 57th Street.
- The Iroquois New York (1901): Mulliken as architect. 49 West 44th Street.
- The Hotel St. James (1901): Mulliken and Moeller as architects. 109 West 45th Street.
- The Hotel York (1902–03): Mulliken as architect. 488 Seventh Avenue, northwest corner of 7th Avenue and 36th Street.40.7526°N 73.99°W
- The Hotel Regent Sherman Square (1902–03, razed in 1969): Mulliken as architect. Combination of the existing Regent Hotel and the existing Sherman Square Hotel. Broadway, 70th to 71stStreet on Sherman Square.
- The Aberdeen Hotel (1902–04): Mulliken as architect. 17-19 West 32nd Street.40°44′53″N 73°59′11″W
- Hotel Cumberland (1902–04): Mulliken as architect. 1706 Broadway or 230 West 54th Street. Now known as the Ameritania Hotel.40.764°N 73.9827°W
- Bretton Hall Hotel (1903): Mulliken and Moeller as architects. 2350 Broadway, from 85th to 86th Streets.
- The Lucerne hotel (1903–04): designated as either Mulliken independently or Mulliken and Moeller as architects by different sources. Later also the Lucerne apartments. Amsterdam Avenue and 79th Street.
- The Woodstock (1903–06, renovated and expanded in 1912): Mulliken and Mueller as architects for the expansion. The expansion included space for a cafe, a Dutch room, and a grill room. 127 West 43rd Street.
- The Jermyn Hotel (1904, razed in 1964): Mulliken and Mueller as architects. Broadway at 61st Street. Also known as the Pasadena and later as the Midtown Hotel.
- Spencer Arms Hotel (1904–05): Mulliken and Moeller as architects, 2020-2026 Broadway, aka 147-149 West 69th Street.
- The Carlyle And Sterling Apartments (1905–06) - Mulliken and Moeller as architects, 521-527 Columbus Avenue and 529-535 Columbus Avenue.
- The Van Dyck and Severn Apartments (1905–07 and 1905–06): Mulliken and Moeller as architects, 269-275 Amsterdam Avenue.
- The Central Park View (1905–06): Mulliken and Moeller as architects, currently 257 Central Park West or 2 West 86th Street.
- Rossleigh Court (1906–07): Mulliken and Moeller as architects, currently 251 Central Park West or 1 West 85thStreet.
- The Chepstow (1907): Mulliken and Moeller as architects, 2660 Broadway.
- The Sexton (1911–12): Mulliken and Moeller as architects, 530 West End Avenue, the corner of West End Avenue and 86thStreet.
- Schwarzenbach buildings (1912): Mulliken and Moeller as architects, 470 Park Avenue South (from 31st Street to 32nd Street).
- The Runoia (1915): Mulliken and Moeller as architects, 267 West 89th Street.
