= Bretton Hall (Manhattan) =

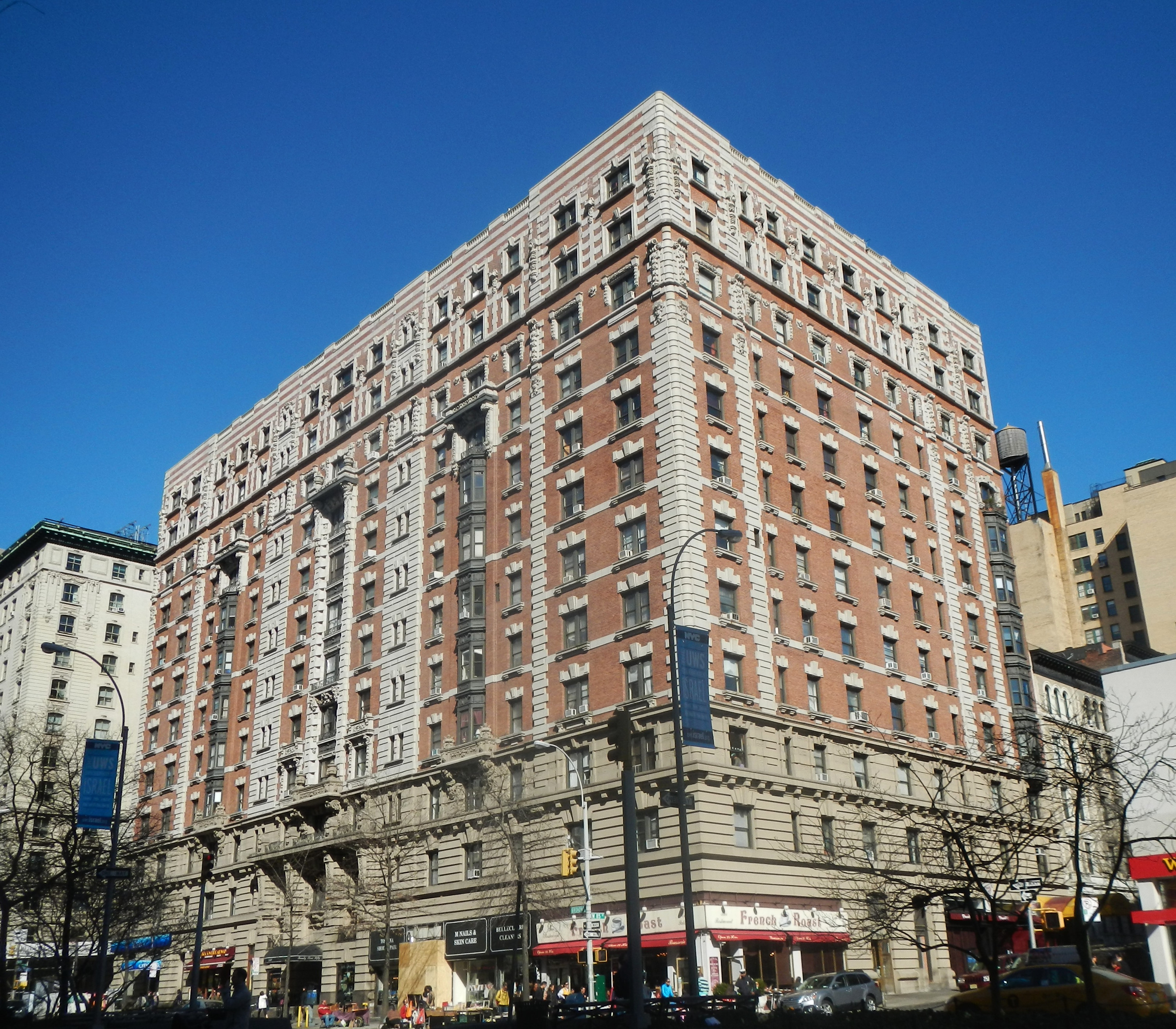
- Interactive map of the Bretton Hall area

General information
- Location: 2350 Broadway; Manhattan, New York City, New York
- Coordinates: 40°47′16″N 73°58′35″W
- Completed: 1903

Height
- Height: 153 feet (47 m)

Technical details
- Floor count: 13

Design and construction
- Architect: Harry B. Mulliken

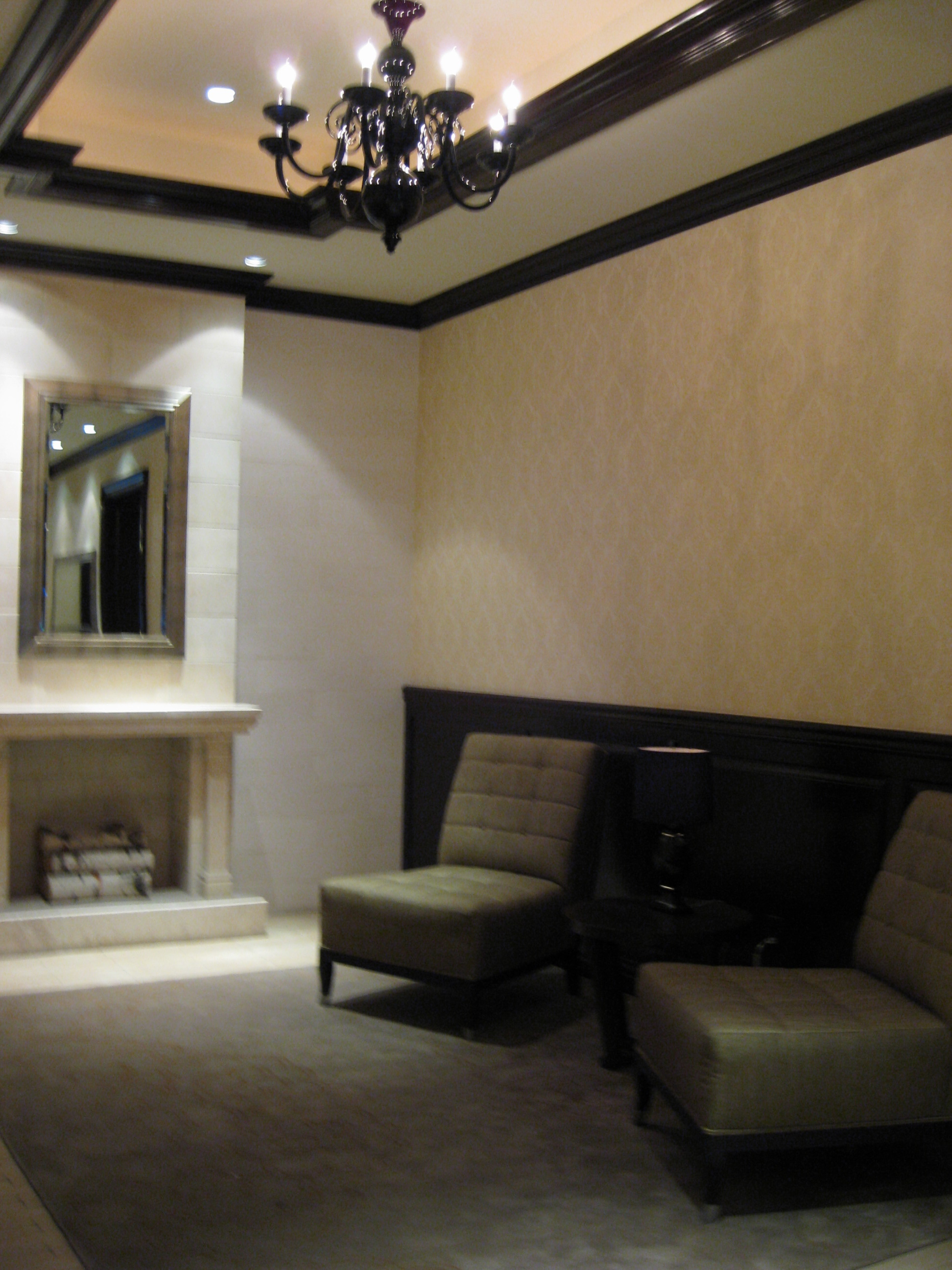
Interior, 2008

Bretton Hall is a twelve-story residential building at 2350 Broadway, spanning from West 85th to 86th Street on the Upper West Side of Manhattan, New York City.

== History ==
It was completed in 1903, as the Hotel Bretton Hall, a residential hotel billing itself as the largest hotel uptown. The architect was Harry B. Mulliken, of Mulliken and Moeller, who designed numerous other hotels: the Cumberland Hotel, Thomas Jefferson Hotel, and the Spencer Arms Hotel on Broadway, the Hotel Lucerne on Amsterdam Avenue at 79th Street, and the Van Dyck, the Severn, the Jermyn, and the Chepstow apartment buildings on the Upper West Side.

The 86th Street Company received the unimproved property from Le Grand K. Petit with a mortgage of $90,000 on it. A building loan of $1,250,000 at 6% was secured from the Metropolitan Life Insurance Company on March 10, 1902. Afterward the 86th Street Company mortgaged the property for $1,365,000 at 6%, due October 1, 1903, to the General Building and Construction Company. John R. & Oscar L. Foley leased Bretton Hall to Anderson & Price for twenty-one years for a price of $2,394,000, for Irons & Todd, who comprised the Seaboard Realty and 86th Street Companies.

In the early 1980s, an organization called Artists Assistance Services rented apartments in the Bretton Hall at lower prices to people in the arts. A proviso was that they would have to share their spaces with a "cultural activity", such as a karate class. The building sits across the street from the Riverside-West End Historic District and one block west of the Upper West Side/Central Park West Historic District and is not landmarks protected.

== Architecture ==
When it opened in late 1903, the apartment hotel was fireproof and equipped with an electric plant and six elevators. It had a deckhouse and basement. The structure contained 187 suites, 506 rooms, 231 baths, and 385 toilet rooms. It fronted Broadway for 205 feet (62 m) and 85th Street for 100.11 feet (30.51 m). Its rear measurement was 204.4 feet. Plans for Bretton Hall were filed on June 7, 1902 with an estimated cost of construction of $1,550,000.

The New York Produce Exchange Bank opened a branch at the Bretton Hall Hotel in November 1903. They leased offices in the edifice for a period of ten years, for an annual rental between $2,500 to $3,500. It was subsequently acquired by investor Benjamin Winter, Sr., who lost it in 1932 during the Great Depression, after filing for bankruptcy.

In the early 21st century, the red brick and limestone building has 461 rental apartments. Its facade employs cornerstones repeatedly, particularly above the central bay above the Broadway entrance. It has a large stainless steel marquee and a four-step-up entrance with a disabled ramp side approach. It is without a garage, sidewalk landscaping, health club, or roof deck. Bretton Hall employs a concierge. The building features ornamental balconies and other architectural attributes. Its fenestration is haphazard. Its facade exemplifies Beaux Arts architecture, yet it lacks the elaborate cornice it originally had. It was lost many years ago. Architect J.C. Calderon has redesigned the parapet in red brick with stone put down in alternating stripes. The restoration of the building cost $1,000,000.

== Media ==
Ambient producer Tetsu Inoue had a studio in this building, and its address lent itself to a series of albums produced by him and Pete Namlook.
