= Musical Mutual Protective Union =

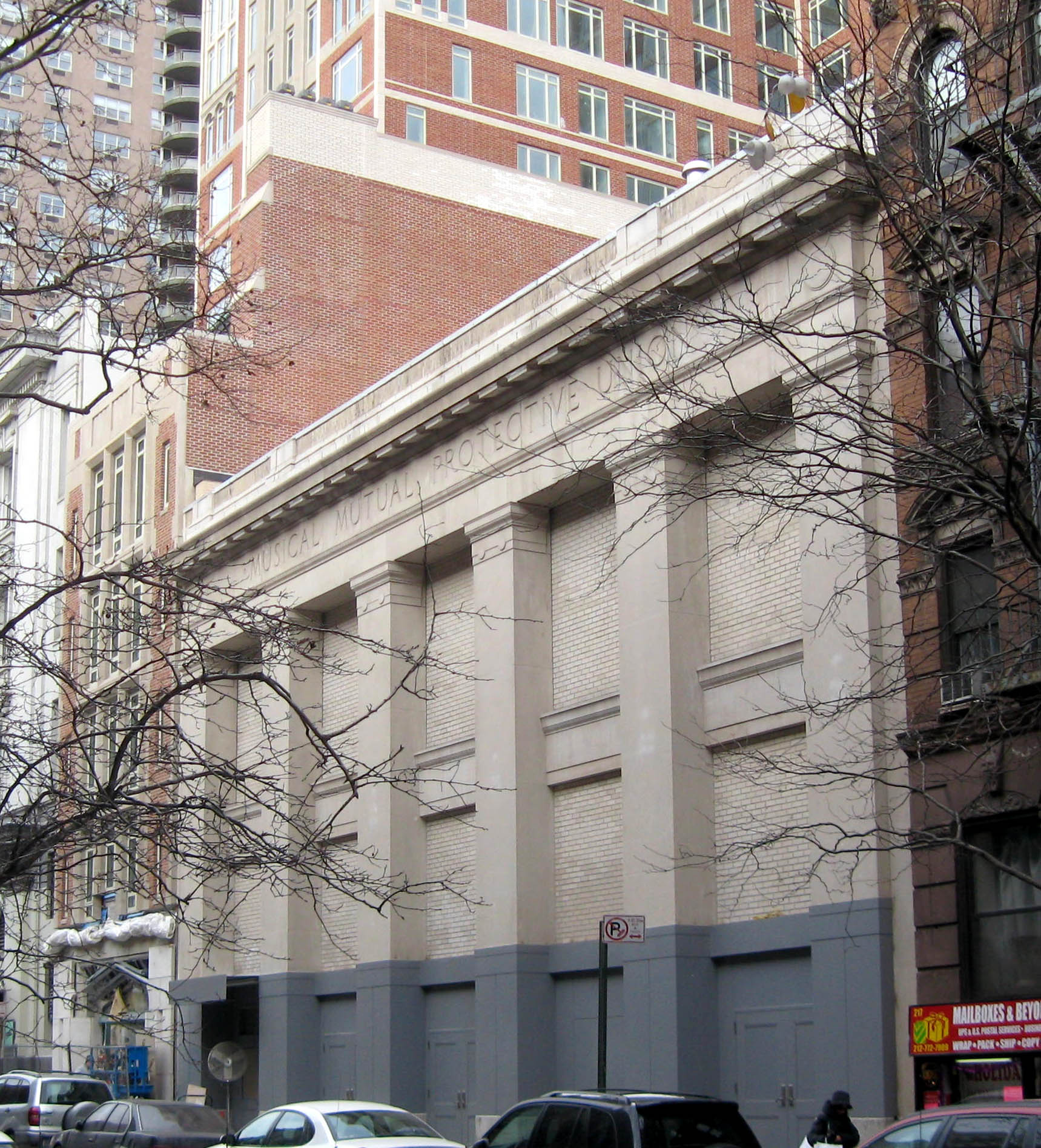
- Founded: 1863
- Headquarters: 209 East 85th Street; Manhattan, New York City
- Location: United States
- Members: Musicians
- Affiliations: Local 301 of the American Federation of Musicians from 1902 to 1921

The Musical Mutual Protective Union (MMPU) was a New York union of musicians, formed in 1863, with a focus on payment made to musicians in theaters and at balls.

In 1885, the union was open to "all instrumental performers, who have been residents of the United States for the period of six months previous to application." Foreign musicians were not allowed to play in orchestras unless they were in a union.

The union became Local 301 of the American Federation of Musicians in 1902. In 1904, it had 5,000 members, who were almost entirely German. In 1910, approximately 300 black musicians were members of the roughly 8,000-member union.

It was located at 209 East 85th Street in Manhattan, New York City, between Second Avenue and Third Avenue, in a building constructed in 1919. The building was later a theater and hall, a casino, and a waiters' union. The basement of the building now houses the Amsterdam Billiard Club. The original facade on 85th Street is still extant.

The union lost its charter in 1921. In 1929, the union planned a mass march against joblessness, claiming 35,000 unemployed, but was unable to secure a parade permit from the police.
