= The Majestic (apartment building) =

Residential skyscraper in Manhattan, New York

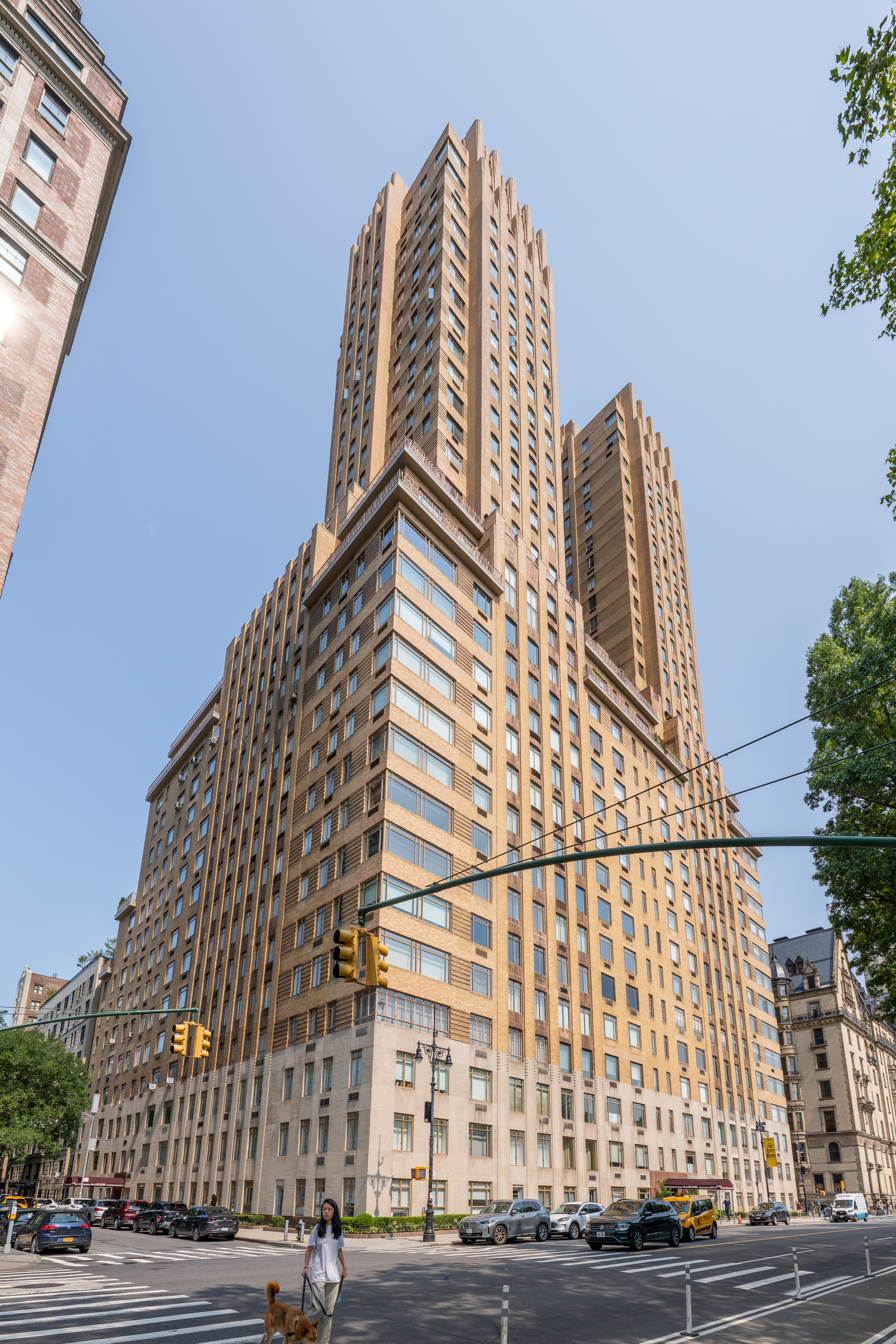
- View from 71st Street and Central Park West (2026)
- Interactive map of the The Majestic area
- Alternative names: Majestic Apartments

General information
- Type: Housing cooperative
- Architectural style: Art Deco
- Location: 115 Central Park West, Manhattan, New York, United States
- Coordinates: 40°46′34″N 73°58′35″W
- Construction started: November 19, 1930; 95 years ago
- Completed: October 1, 1931; 94 years ago

Height
- Height: 346 ft (105 m)

Technical details
- Structural system: Steel superstructure
- Floor count: 31

Design and construction
- Architects: Irwin S. Chanin, Jacques Delamarre

New York City Landmark
- Designated: March 8, 1988
- Reference no.: 1518

U.S. Historic district – Contributing property
- Designated: November 9, 1982
- Reference no.: 82001189

References
- "Emporis building ID 115842". Emporis. Archived from the original on May 14, 2022.

The Majestic (also known as the Majestic Apartments) is a cooperative apartment building at 115 Central Park West, between 71st and 72nd Streets, on the Upper West Side of Manhattan in New York City, United States. It was constructed from 1930 to 1931 and was designed by the firm of Irwin S. Chanin in the Art Deco style. The Majestic is 30 stories tall, with twin towers rising from a 19-story base. The building is a contributing property to the Central Park West Historic District, a National Register of Historic Places–listed district, and is a New York City designated landmark.

The base surrounds an internal courtyard to the west, and two towers rise from the eastern portion of the base above that level. There are several cantilevered terraces with Art Deco balustrades. The first three stories are clad in cast stone, and the remainder of the facade is made of tan and brown brick with multi-paned windows. The floor slabs are cantilevered from a central core, permitting the inclusion of enclosed solariums at the northeast and southeast corners. There are vertical piers on several parts of the facade, contrasting with the horizontal solariums. When the building opened, it operated much like a short-term hotel with housekeeping and catering services. There were originally 235 apartments with two to eleven rooms, but several apartments have been split or combined over the years.

The Chanin brothers bought the site in April 1929 and constructed the building from November 1930 to May 1931. The building officially opened on October 1, 1931, and the Chanins lost the Majestic to foreclosure two years later. The New York Majestic Corporation took over the building in 1937 and operated it for twenty years, when the Majestic became a housing cooperative. The Majestic remained an upscale development after its conversion, and it has undergone several renovations throughout its history. The building's residents have included artistic personalities as well as criminals.

== Site ==
The Majestic is at 115 Central Park West on the Upper West Side of Manhattan in New York City, United States. The building occupies the western sidewalk of Central Park West (formerly Eighth Avenue) between 71st Street to the south and 72nd Street to the north. The Majestic occupies a nearly rectangular land lot with an area of 40,866 ft^{2} (3,796.6 m^{2}). The land lot has a frontage of 200 ft (61 m) along Central Park West, 225 ft (69 m) on 72nd Street, and 187 ft (57 m) on 71st Street. Nearby places include the Dakota apartment building immediately to the north, the Olcott Hotel to the northwest, 101 Central Park West to the south, and Central Park to the east.

The Majestic is one of several apartment buildings on Central Park West that are primarily identified by an official name. Even though a street address was sufficient to identify these apartment buildings, this trend followed a British practice of giving names to buildings without addresses. By contrast, buildings on Fifth Avenue, along the eastern side of Central Park, are mainly known by their addresses.

=== Previous structure ===
The construction of Central Park in the 1860s spurred construction on the Upper East Side of Manhattan, but similar development on the Upper West Side was slower to come. Major developments on the West Side were erected after the Ninth Avenue elevated line opened in 1879, providing direct access to Lower Manhattan. The first large apartment building in the area was the Dakota, which opened in 1884. The city installed power lines on Central Park West at the end of the 19th century, thus allowing the construction of multi-story apartment hotels with elevators.

Among these early apartment hotels was the original Hotel Majestic between 71st and 72nd Streets, which opened in 1894. The hotel was developed by millinery and real estate magnate Jacob Rothschild and had been designed by Alfred Zucker. The hotel was 12 stories tall with 600 rooms, and it contained amenities that were meant to rival those of the Dakota. The old Majestic had contained an Egyptian-style women's writing room, a ballroom, facilities for bowling and billiards, and a rooftop garden. The Majestic had been home to personalities such as Gustav Mahler and Edna Ferber. When the hotel was sold in 1929, the New York Herald Tribune described the old building as "one of the best known hotels west of Central Park". By the 1920s, high-rise apartment buildings were being developed on Central Park West in anticipation of the construction of the New York City Subway's Eighth Avenue Line.

== Architecture ==
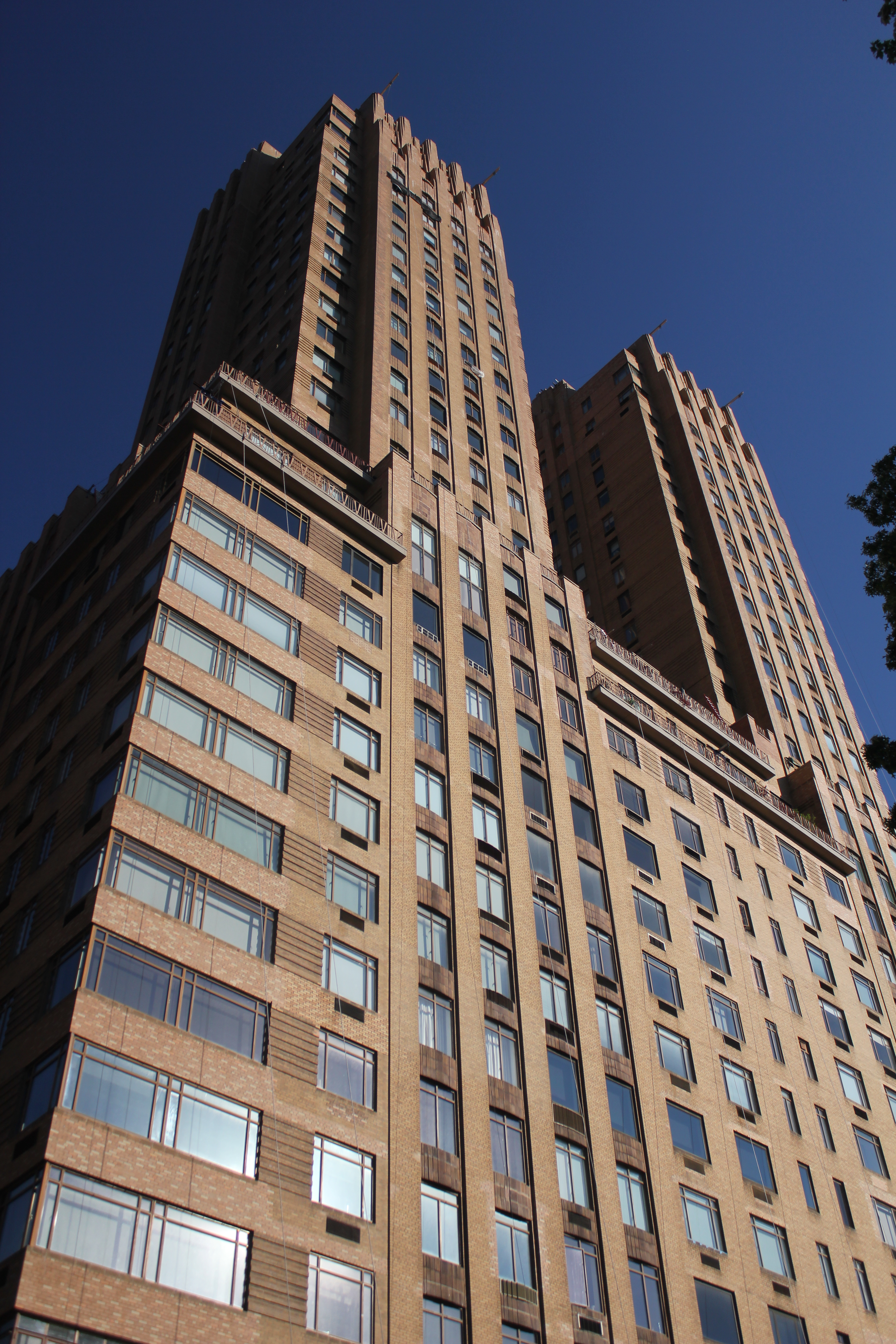
Twin towers of the Majestic as seen from Central Park West

The building was designed and developed by Irwin Chanin, who worked with his firm's architectural director Jacques Delamarre. The futuristic sculptures on the building's facade are by Rene Chambellan. The building is variously cited as being 29, 30, 31, or 32 stories tall. According to Emporis, the building is 346 ft (105 m) tall.

The Majestic Apartments was Chanin's first Art Deco residential building; he also developed the Century several blocks south in the same style. Chanin had described the style as "experimental" in a 1985 interview with architectural historian Andrew Dolkart. The Majestic also incorporates elements of the International Style and the French Modern Classical style. The Century, 55 Central Park West, the Majestic, the El Dorado, 241 Central Park West, and the Ardsley constitute a major grouping of Art Deco buildings on Central Park West. In early promotional materials, the Chanin Organization described the Majestic as being a "Modern American" structure. The modernistic Art Deco design was intended to appeal to "new money" residents, as opposed to the classical designs of the Beresford and the San Remo, where many residents were of "old money" wealth.

=== Form ===
On the Majestic's 19-story base, the massing fills its lot line on the north, east, and south, and there is an interior courtyard. The interior courtyard was designed as a "garden court" and contained foliage. There are setbacks starting at the 14th story, which contain terraces enclosed by metal railings. These setbacks were intended to emphasize the horizontal lines of the facade, and they also allowed the terraces to blend in with the massing. When the building opened, there was high demand for apartments with large terraces, particularly before air conditioning became popular.

Above the 19th story, two towers rise from the eastern portion of the base. Though the towers are designed to appear identical, the north tower is slightly wider than the south tower. The Majestic is one of four buildings on Central Park West with a twin-towered form; the others are the Century, the San Remo, and the El Dorado. (Note: The New York Times also characterizes the Beresford as having twin towers. However, the structure actually has three relatively short, octagonal pinnacles.) By splitting the upper stories into twin towers, as opposed to a single bulky tower, the developers could increase the amount of space that was near a window.

The massing of the Majestic, and those of similar buildings, was shaped primarily by the Multiple Dwelling Act of 1929. Under this legislation, the "street walls" of apartment buildings could rise one and a half times the width of the adjacent street before they had to set back. On lots of more than 25,000 ft^{2} (2,300 m^{2}), the street walls could rise three times the width of the adjacent street. In practice, this meant that buildings on Central Park West could rise 19 stories before setting back. The legislation also mandated courtyards in large apartment buildings.

=== Facade ===
The lowest three stories contain a light-gray facade of cast stone, placed above a water table of polished rose-and-black granite. There are entrances facing all three streets, each of which contain polished granite frames. Some of the windows are separated vertically by piers, which contain notches above the 3rd story. On each elevation, the piers divide the facade into bays and rise through the upper sections of the facade. Each of the entrances is flanked by several piers.

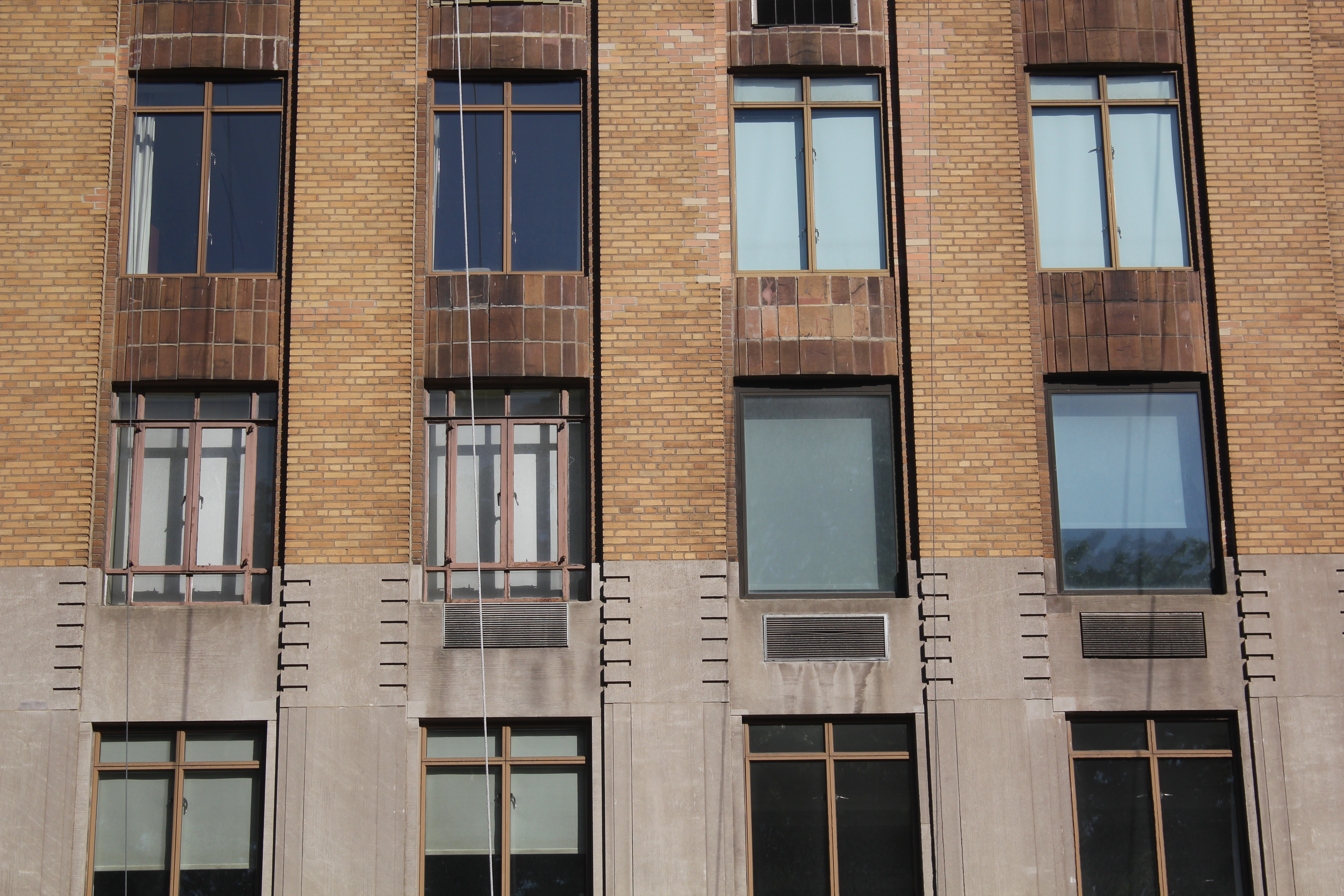
View of some windows on the third to fifth stories

Above the 3rd story, the facade is covered in yellowish brick. The corners of the building were outfitted with windows wrapping around the edge at a 90-degree angle, which Chanin referred to as solariums. (Note: The southeast-corner windows were originally divided vertically into three panes along the south elevation and eight panes along the east elevation. Likewise, the northeast-corner windows were divided into three panes along the north elevation and eight panes along the east elevation. At both corners, each pane was divided horizontally into three sections, with upper and lower transoms.) Chanin wanted residents to be able to remove the glass panes during summer so they could use the corners as outdoor terraces. This was part of Chanin's effort to provide apartments with more "light and air". The corner windows are separated vertically from adjacent windows by striated brickwork panels. Some of the bays are separated vertically by the brick piers; the windows within these bays are separated horizontally by curved spandrel panels. The vertical piers were intended to provide a sharp contrast with the horizontal lines on the remainder of the facade. Many of the windows are divided into two or three panes, although the windows in the tower stories are single panes; each pane is also divided horizontally into three sections.

The tops of the towers are simpler than those at the Century. The east elevations of the towers are topped by square-headed abstract decorations. Conversely, the west elevations are topped by rounded stone decorations. In 2007, Christopher Gray of The New York Times described the rounded structures on the western portion of the roof as being akin to "a giant dynamo" from the film Metropolis.

=== Interior ===
The Majestic is divided functionally into five sections, and staff must go outdoors to travel between each section. The building has 12 elevators. The first story has a main lobby and a restaurant, as well as private lobbies for the different sections of the building. In addition, the base contained a provision for an entrance to the 72nd Street station of the New York City Subway was placed at the building's base, although the entrance never opened. The lobby was designed in an Art Moderne style with white-metal walls and terrazzo floors. The New York Times wrote in 1966 that "even partisans agree [it] is something of a horror".

When the building opened, it operated like a short-term hotel with housekeeping and catering services. There was also an "emergency help and valet" service for residents. Most elevators were staffed by elevator operators.

==== Apartments ====
As of 2022, the New York City Department of City Planning cites the Majestic as having 238 residential apartments and 15 non-residential units. At first, there were 235 apartments in the building. Originally there were maisonette apartments, intended for physicians, on the first floor. On the lower stories, each apartment generally had three to fourteen rooms, arranged in either one-story simplexes or two-story duplexes. The apartments in the towers had either four, six, or ten rooms. Originally, all the tower units were supposed to have ten rooms, but some of the units were subdivided during construction to make them easier to sell during the Great Depression. After the building became a housing cooperative in the 1950s, apartments ranged from two to eleven rooms. A typical eight-room apartment had three bedrooms, two maids' rooms, a living room, a kitchen, and a foyer. The smallest suites had a single bedroom and a small dining alcove, while larger apartments had several bedrooms, a solarium, library, dining room, and servants' rooms. Chanin also included penthouse apartments and a solarium on the roof.

The walls between apartments were soundproofed. All apartments included high ceilings, foyers, large bathrooms with dressing rooms, and ventilated kitchens. The foyers were known as "galleries" because they were unusually large, measuring up to 28 by 12 ft (8.5 by 3.7 m). The galleries in the simplex units were only slightly higher than the rest of the apartment; those in the duplex units were between 1 1/4 and 1 3/4 stories tall. To accommodate this, some galleries were depressed below the rest of the apartment. The galleries had wood-burning fireplaces, while the dining rooms and other spaces had electric fireplaces. The bathrooms in each apartment contained colored tiles and custom plumbing fixtures. The living rooms, dining rooms, galleries, and library rooms were all covered in walnut flooring, as Chanin believed the material was less susceptible to creaking. About 100 types of fixtures were manufactured for the building.

Several tenants hired their own architects to renovate their units. For example, in the 2000s, Philippe Starck renovated a pair of apartments for entrepreneur Ian Schrager, which were decorated with such details as a large marble bathtub, an imitation of an exposed steel column, and walls paneled in makore wood. Also in the 2000s, Annabelle Selldorf renovated another pair of apartments that were occupied by businessmen George Malkemus and Anthony Yurgaitis.

==== Mechanical features ====
About 7,000 short tons (6,200 long tons; 6,400 t) of steel was used in the Majestic's superstructure. The largest column weighed about 15 short tons (13 long tons; 14 t). The floor slabs were cantilevered from "heavy central columns" inspired by those in several German buildings. The cantilevered floor slabs allowed the inclusion of the solariums at each corner, since there were no corner columns like in typical buildings. Because of increasing public opposition to soot and dust emissions from apartment buildings, the Majestic did not have its own steam plant as older buildings did. The building instead contains a 20,000 U.S. gal (76,000 L) fuel tank, and its roof includes six water towers.

== History ==
By the late 1920s, high-rise apartment buildings were being developed on Central Park West in anticipation of the completion of the New York City Subway's Eighth Avenue Line, which opened in 1932. Central Park West was concurrently widened from 48 to 63 ft (15 to 19 m). Under the Multiple Dwelling Act of 1929, this allowed the construction of proportionally taller buildings on the avenue.

Irwin Chanin was an American architect and real estate developer who designed several Art Deco towers and Broadway theaters. He and his brother Henry designed their first Manhattan buildings in 1924, including the Chanin Building. They then built and operated a number of theaters and other structures related to the entertainment industry, including the Roxy Theatre and the Hotel Lincoln. Among the Chanins' Broadway theaters was the Majestic Theatre (built alongside the Royale Theatre and Theatre Masque); the theater and apartment building do not appear to be related, despite the similarity in name and developer. The Majestic Apartments is the older of two Art Deco apartment houses on Central Park West that the Chanins developed; the other is the Century Apartments, completed in 1931. Both developments were named after the buildings that had formerly occupied their respective sites.

=== Development ===
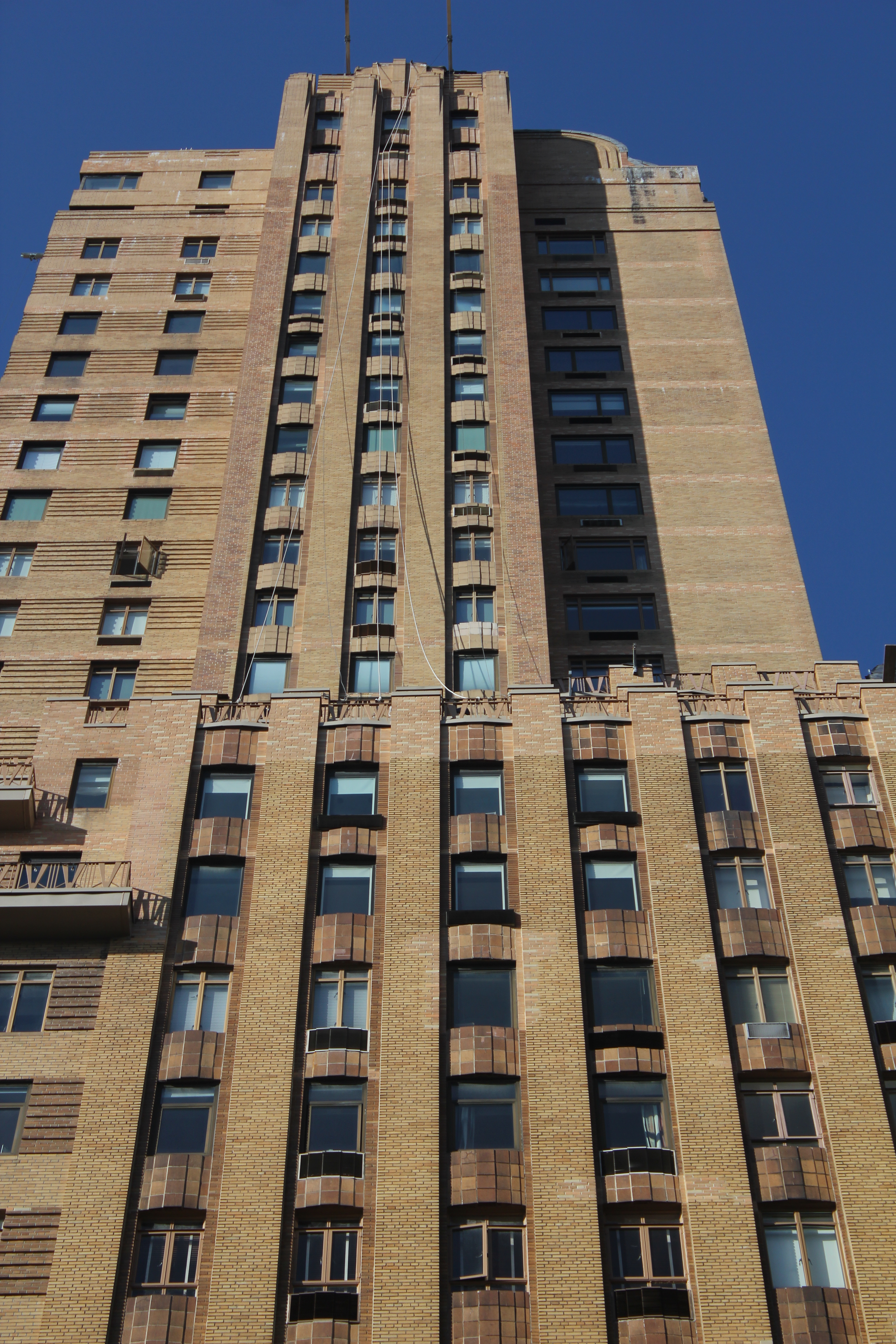
Seen from 72nd Street

In December 1928, the Hotel Majestic was sold to a developer who planned an apartment complex on the site. In April 1929, Frederick Brown bought the Hotel Majestic and an adjacent plot for $5 million. The assemblage measured 200 feet along Central Park West, 187.6 ft (57.2 m) on 71st Street, and 225 ft (69 m) on 72nd Street. Brown quickly resold it to the Chanin brothers, who planned to build a 45-story apartment hotel on the site, costing $16 million. The Chanins planned to complete the hotel in October 1930. The hotel closed on October 1, 1929, when the Chanins took title to the site, and demolition began two weeks afterward. About half of the new building was planned to be studio apartments, maisonettes, and duplexes with six to fifteen rooms. The rest of the building would contain kitchenette apartments with five or fewer rooms. Also to be included in the new building were meeting rooms, a ballroom, large dining rooms, and a full service kitchen. According to a later account by The New York Times, the apartments would have had 11 to 24 rooms.

The original plans were changed due to the Great Depression and the passage of the Multiple Dwelling Act. In June 1930, following the Wall Street Crash of 1929, the Chanins reduced the project to 29 or 30 stories, and the sizes of the apartments were downsized. At the time, they were still considering which materials to use. Shortly thereafter, the Chanins received a $9.4 million first mortgage loan from the Straus National Bank and Trust Company, which then issued bonds. By that July, foundation work was underway, and Hay Foundry and Iron Works had received the contract for the structural steel. Initially, Irwin Chanin had hoped to start erecting the superstructure over a 12-week period starting in August 1930. By that November, construction had not started, but Irwin Chanin announced that he would hire 3,000 workers to construct the Majestic and Century. In so doing, Chanin planned to take advantage of low material and construction costs.

On November 19, 1930, the Chanin brothers drove the first rivets into the Majestic's superstructure, manufactured specifically for the occasion from the Hotel Majestic's structural steel. The project employed up to 1,400 workers at any time. The building topped out during May 1931, at which point the brickwork and masonry of the Majestic were nearly complete. Even so, Chanin said the work was not half done because a "vast amount of interior equipment" was required for apartment buildings, particularly in comparison to office buildings. By that September, the Majestic Apartments were ready to open; the building had cost $10 million. Though the Chanins had previously developed over 80 projects, the Majestic was the first to be developed entirely by subsidiaries of the Chanin Organization instead of subcontractors. At the building's opening, Chanin predicted that the Majestic would be obsolete in fifty years and that it would be replaced by a glass tower. Chanin said at the time: "If the new Majestic is in existence after 1981, it will be somewhat of an architectural curiosity." He embedded an envelope within the Majestic's wall containing photos and plans of the old, current, and future buildings on the site; the envelope would be removed if the building was demolished.

=== Rental house ===
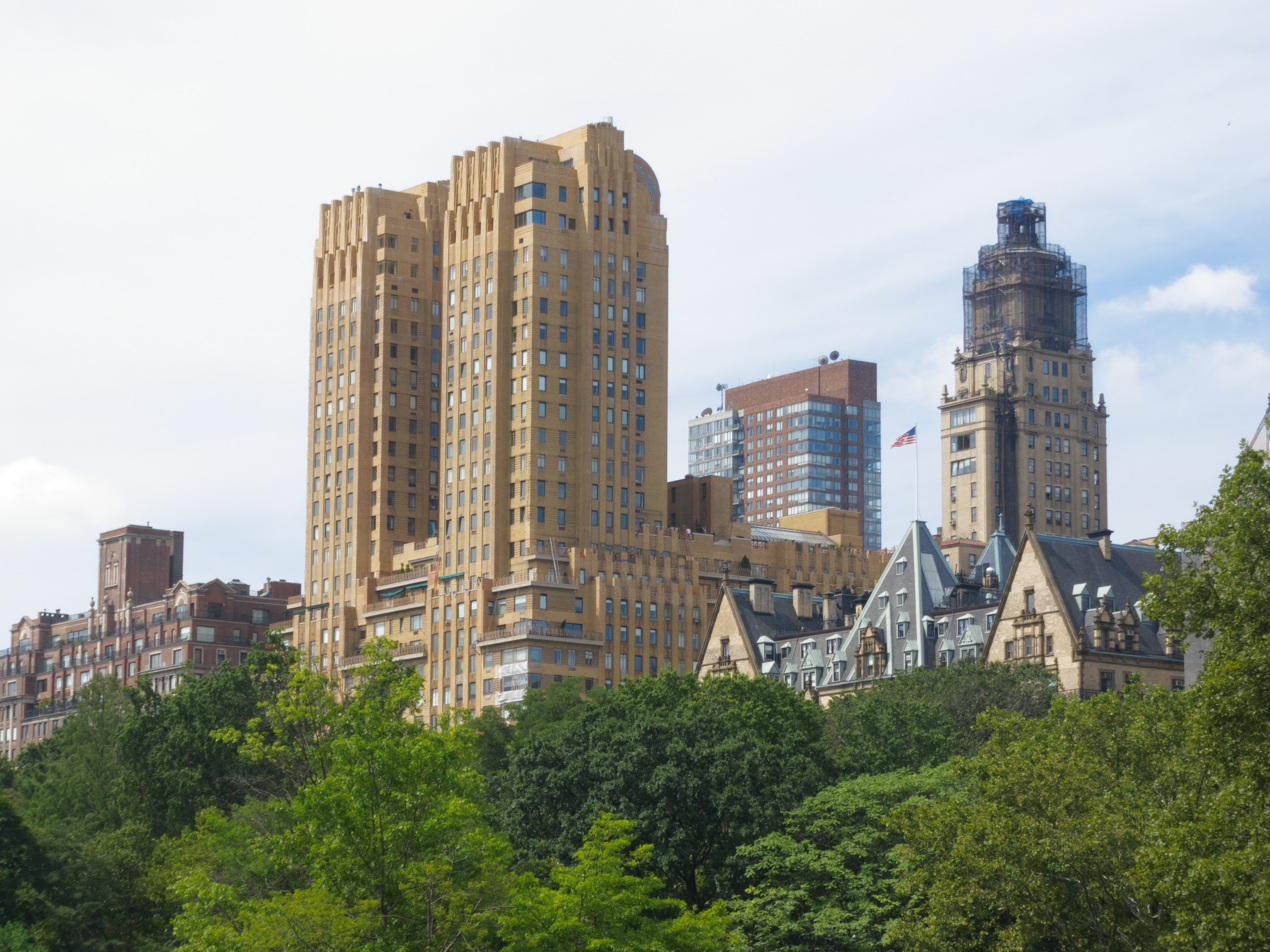
View of the Majestic from Central Park

The first tenant to move into the building was cartoonist Harry Hershfield, who moved into his apartment on September 29, 1931, two days before the official opening date on October 1. A promotional brochure for the Majestic proclaimed that the building was a solution to "the complexities—physical, psychological and social—of modern New York life". At the time, only about 45 of the 205 apartments were finished, and the building was not complete even in March 1932. In addition to residential tenants, the Explorers Club moved its library and clubhouse to the building in 1932. Most of the earliest leases were for smaller apartments, but the larger units were being leased at a rate of one per day by September 1932. Two years after the building opened, nearly all of the seven-room and eight-room suites had been leased.

In June 1932, two of the mortgage bondholders sued the Chanins and requested that the building be put into receivership, but a New York Supreme Court judge denied the request. The Continental Bank and Trust Company, successor to the Straus National Trust Company, sought to foreclose on the building in March 1933. It began collecting rents from the Majestic; at the time, a ten-room apartment in the tower was listed for as little as $6,500 annually. The foreclosure proceeding was still ongoing when three individual bondholders sued in early 1935 to have the building reorganized. Later that year, several former Straus officials were accused of fraud, since the building had not been completed when the bond issue was made. Separately, the U.S. Securities and Exchange Commission was investigating allegations that Straus was coercing its own salesmen to sell the building's mortgage bonds quickly. Ultimately, a state judge approved a plan to replace the existing bonds at face value.

The New York Majestic Corporation took over the building in 1937, and it received a loan of $2.5 million from the Mutual Life Insurance Company of New York that November. By then, 91 percent of the apartments were rented. The New York Majestic Corporation obtained a $2.435 million first mortgage loan from an "out-of-town" company in 1940. Shortly thereafter, the building's managers contracted with the New York Steam Corporation to provide steam for the building due to a shortage of oil during World War II. The journalist Peter Osnos wrote that the Majestic and other Central Park West apartment houses contained many Jewish residents during the 1930s and 1940s, since these buildings were not "restricted", unlike others on the East Side.

The building's lobby had been renovated by 1952, when decorator Gladys Miller removed "superfluous decoration" from the lobby. In 1957, Vincent "The Chin" Gigante shot mobster Frank Costello, a Majestic resident, in the lobby during a failed assassination attempt. Costello survived, but the shooting damaged a section of the lobby's wall, which was covered by a laminated panel.

=== Cooperative conversion ===
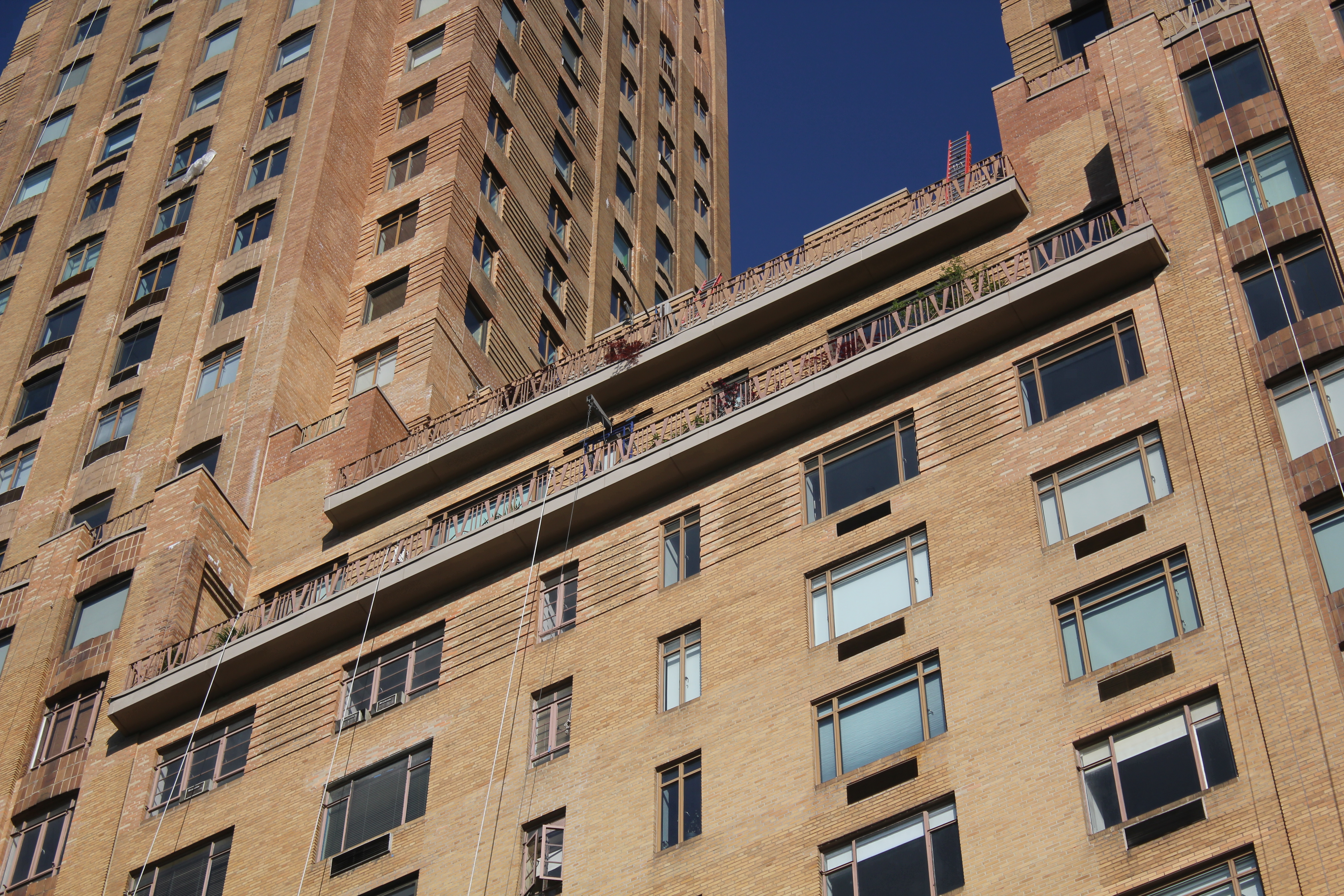
Terraces near the center of the Central Park West elevation

In September 1957, it was announced that the Majestic would become a cooperative apartment house with 235 apartments, and a new entity called the 115 Central Park West Corporation started selling shares to existing residents. At the time, there were 1,200 residents. Some tenants opposed the conversion and sued in the New York Supreme Court in an attempt to halt it; the lawsuit was settled out of court. The 115 Central Park West Corporation took title to the Majestic in July 1958. The Majestic was one of twelve apartment buildings on Central Park West to be converted into housing cooperatives in the late 1950s and early 1960s, as well as one of the largest such cooperatives on the street. The co-op board received a $3 million mortgage loan for the building in 1964.

By the mid-1960s, the Majestic had around 235 apartments, ranging from two to eleven rooms. A typical eight-room apartment cost $50,000 to $65,000 with monthly maintenance costs of $350 to $385. Many of the Majestic's newer residents were families with several young children, who wished to occupy large apartments but were unwilling or unable to buy a more expensive apartment on the Upper East Side. Around 1968, the Majestic replaced the directors on its co-op board with a set of committees that oversaw different parts of the building's operation. The building remained an upscale development, with apartments selling at an average of $46,130 per room in 1980. Around that time, the building's board allowed tenants to replace windows in their apartments. Rosenblum/Harb Architects renovated the lobby in 1984, restoring the original design.

A new service entrance was built in the 1990s; at that time, the building's residents largely worked in law, medicine, or finance. During that decade, Crain's New York described the Majestic, Beresford, and El Dorado as having "become brand names that grow in strength as noted personalities move in". Walter B. Melvin Architects renovated the facade in 2007 at a cost of $2.5 million. By then, there were 238 apartments, which ranged in price from $2.5 million to $25 million. The co-op board sued two contractors in 2014, alleging that their negligence had resulted in leaks throughout the building.

== Notable people ==
According to a 1996 article in New York magazine, many brokers classified the Majestic as one of several "second tier" apartment buildings on Central Park West. These buildings were slightly less prestigious than other structures such as 88 Central Park West, 101 Central Park West, the Dakota, and the Beresford. Notable residents have included:

- Kathleen Battle, soprano
- Milton Berle, actor
- Alan Hawley, aviator
- Harry Hershfield, cartoonist
- Marc Jacobs, fashion designer; grew up in the building
- Ted Lewis, orchestra leader
- Zero Mostel, actor
- Victor Moore, actor
- Conan O'Brien, television host
- Edward R. Pressman, film producer; grew up in the building
- Samuel Roxy Rothafel, theatrical impresario
- James Toback, film director; grew up in the building
- Carmen Marc Valvo, fashion designer
- Susan Weber, historian
- Walter Winchell, columnist

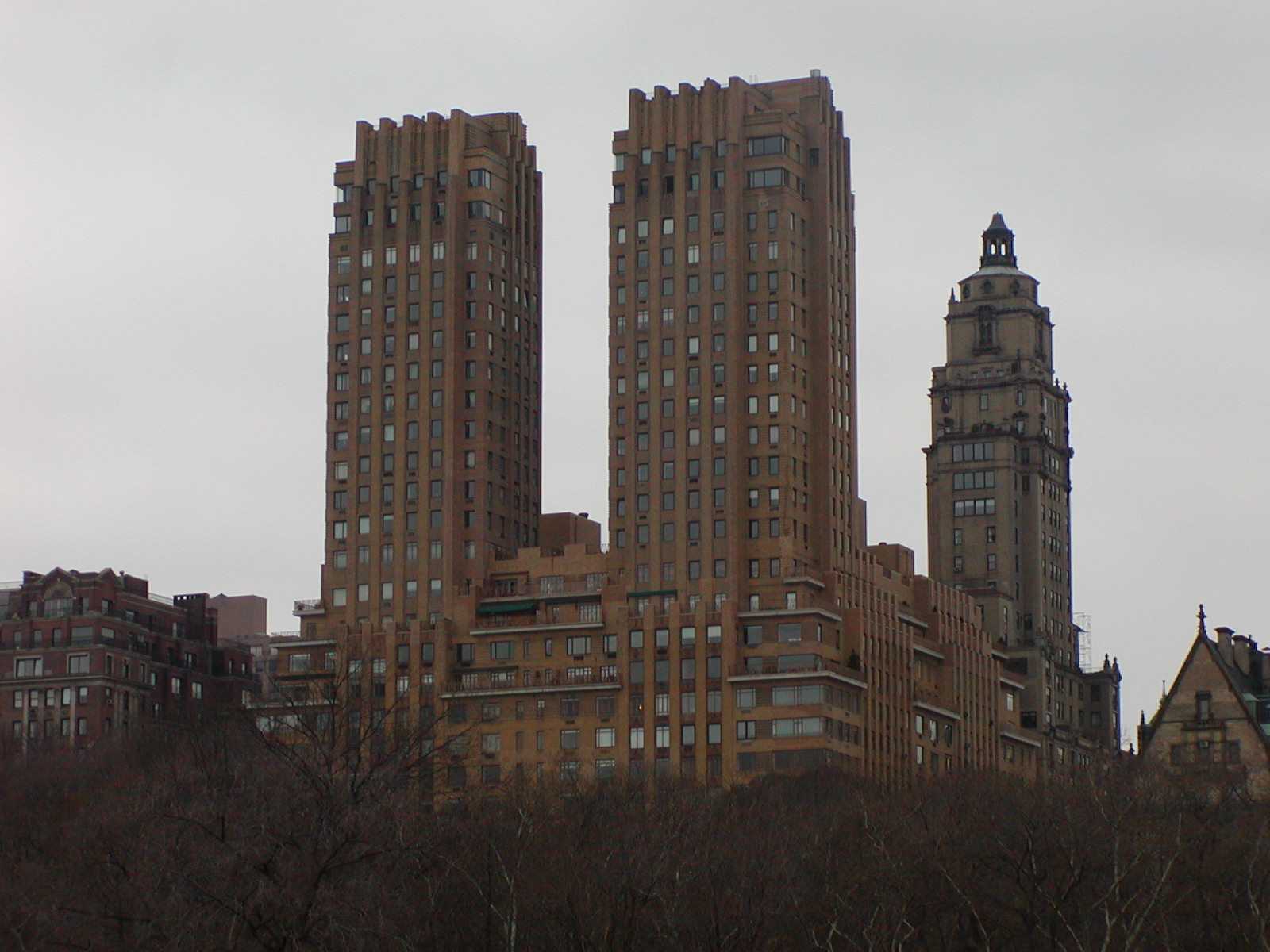
Viewed from Central Park

Ian Schrager bought two 19th-story apartments in 1997 for $9 million in what was the most expensive sale at a co-op on Central Park West at the time. Despite having hired Philippe Starck to renovate his apartment, Schrager never lived at the Majestic; instead, Susan Weber bought Schrager's apartment in 2006.

The Majestic has also been home to some of the former heads of the Luciano crime family (later called the Genovese crime family), including Lucky Luciano, Frank Costello, and Meyer Lansky. Louis "Lepke" Buchalter, a founding member of the New York syndicate, along with Meyer Lansky and Lucky Luciano, and head of its security arm, Murder, Inc., lived in apartment 17J in 1933. In addition, Bruno Hauptmann worked as a carpenter in the Majestic in 1932 before he was convicted of killing the son of Charles Lindbergh and Anne Morrow Lindbergh.

== Impact ==
Architectural critic Lewis Mumford regarded the modernist designs of the Century and Majestic apartment buildings as "merely a thin veneer" with their corner windows, terraces, and water towers. According to Mumford, "even the relatively plain facades do not authenticate these structures". Conversely, during the 1980s, New York Times architectural critic Paul Goldberger called the Century and Majestic "two of the city's most beloved Art Moderne apartment houses" and said the apartment layouts "have a sense of spaces neatly interlocked". A member of the Art Deco Society of New York described the Century, El Dorado, and Majestic as "distinguished" Art Deco buildings in 1984. According to architectural historian Anthony W. Robins, "The comparison of Chanin's Century and Majestic with Emery Roth's San Remo is stunning." In addition, the design for what is now Deutsche Bank Center at Columbus Circle was inspired by those of the Century and the Majestic.

The building is a contributing property to the Central Park West Historic District, which was recognized by the U.S. National Register of Historic Places when its nomination was accepted on November 9, 1982. In 1984, the New York City Landmarks Preservation Commission (LPC) hosted hearings to determine whether the Century, Majestic, San Remo, Beresford, and El Dorado should be designated as city landmarks. Manhattan Community Board 7 supported all five designations, though the Majestic's co-op board was concerned about whether the landmark designation would potentially hinder the building's maintenance. The LPC designated the Majestic as a city landmark on March 8, 1988. The Majestic is also part of the Upper West Side Historic District, which became a New York City historic district in 1990.

== See also ==
- Art Deco architecture of New York City
- List of New York City Designated Landmarks in Manhattan from 59th to 110th Streets
