= The Dakota =

Residential building in Manhattan, New York

- U.S. National Register of Historic Places
- U.S. National Historic Landmark
- U.S. Historic district – Contributing property
- New York State Register of Historic Places
- New York City Landmark
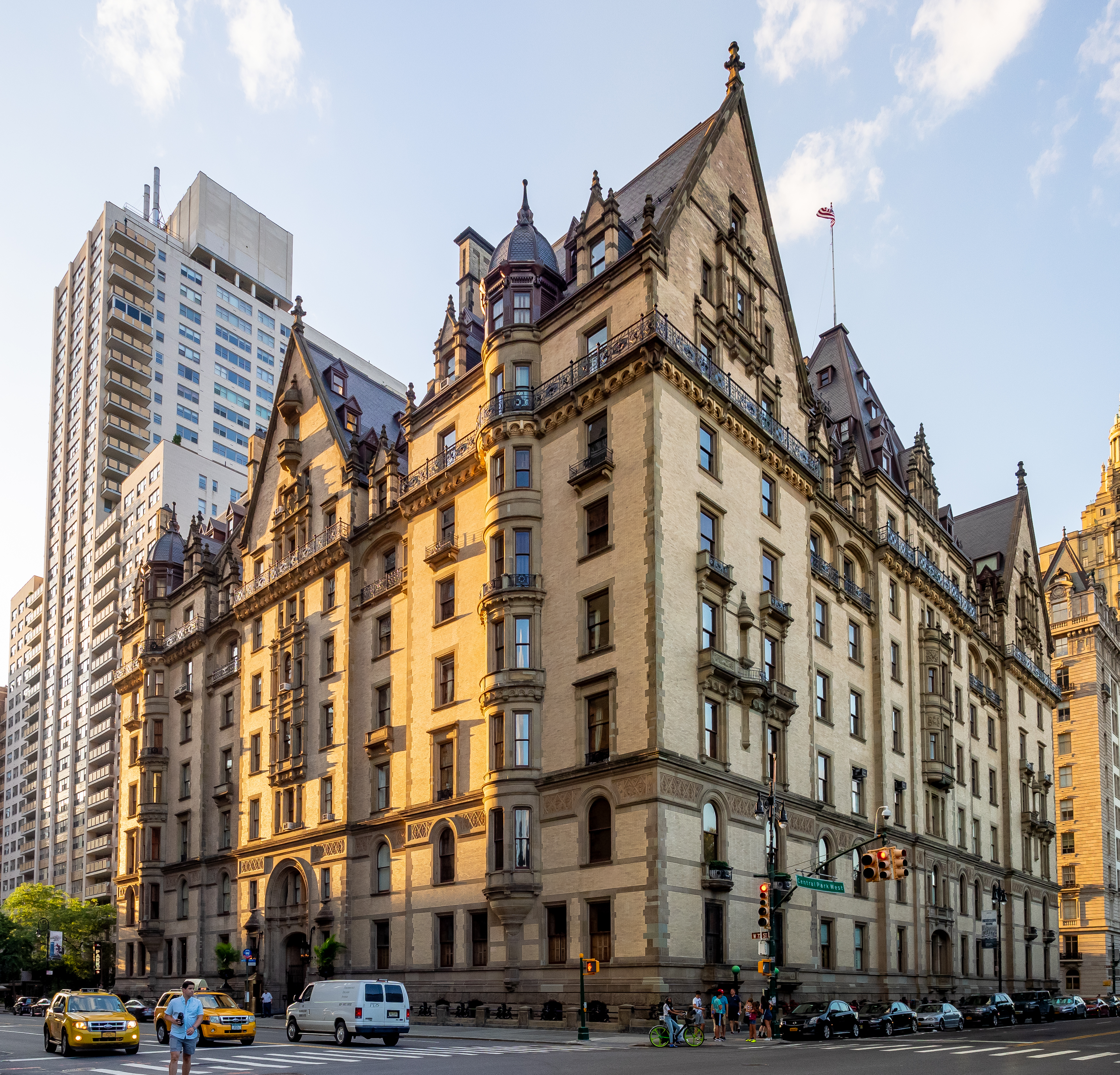
- As seen from Central Park West
- Location: 1 West 72nd Street; Manhattan, New York, U.S.
- Coordinates: 40°46′36″N 73°58′35″W
- Built: 1880–1884
- Architect: Henry Janeway Hardenbergh
- Architectural style: German Renaissance
- Part of: Central Park West Historic District (ID82001189)
- NRHP reference No.: 72000869
- NYSRHP No.: 06101.000170
- NYCL No.: 0280

Significant dates
- Added to NRHP: April 26, 1972
- Designated NHL: December 8, 1976
- Designated CP: November 9, 1982
- Designated NYSRHP: June 23, 1980
- Designated NYCL: February 11, 1969

The Dakota, also known as the Dakota Apartments, is a cooperative apartment building at 1 West 72nd Street on the Upper West Side of Manhattan in New York City, New York, US. The Dakota was constructed between 1880 and 1884 in the German Renaissance style and was designed by Henry Janeway Hardenbergh for businessman Edward Cabot Clark. The building was one of the first large developments on the Upper West Side and is the oldest remaining luxury apartment building in New York City. The building is a National Historic Landmark and has been designated a city landmark by the New York City Landmarks Preservation Commission. The building is also a contributing property to the Central Park West Historic District.

The Dakota occupies the western side of Central Park West between 72nd and 73rd streets. It is largely square in plan and built around a central H-shaped courtyard, through which all apartments are accessed. Formerly, there was a garden to the west of the Dakota, underneath which was a mechanical plant serving the Dakota and some adjacent row houses. The facade is largely composed of brick with sandstone trim and terracotta detailing. The main entrance is a double-height archway on 72nd Street, which leads to the courtyard. The building's design includes deep roofs with dormers, terracotta spandrels and panels, niches, balconies, and balustrades. Each apartment at the Dakota had a unique layout with four to twenty rooms. The building is divided into quadrants, each of which has a stair and an elevator for tenants, as well as another stair and another elevator for servants.

After Clark announced plans for an apartment complex at the site in 1879, work began in late October 1880. The building was not given its name until mid-1882, and Clark died before the Dakota was completed in October 1884. The Dakota was fully rented upon its completion. The building was managed by the Clark family for eight decades and remained largely unchanged during that time. In 1961, the Dakota's residents bought the building from the Clark family and converted it into a housing cooperative. The Dakota has historically been home to many artists, actors, and musicians, including John Lennon, who was murdered outside the building on December 8, 1980. The building remained a cooperative into the 21st century.

== Site ==
The Dakota is at 1 West 72nd Street on the Upper West Side of Manhattan in New York City, New York, US. The building occupies the western sidewalk of Central Park West (formerly Eighth Avenue) between 72nd Street to the south and 73rd Street to the north. The Dakota occupies a nearly square land lot with an area of 40,866 ft^{2} (3,796.6 m^{2}). The land lot has frontages of 200 ft (61 m) along Central Park West and 204 ft (62 m) along 72nd and 73rd streets. Nearby locations include the Majestic apartment building immediately to the south, the Olcott Hotel to the west, the Langham apartment building to the north, and Central Park (including the Strawberry Fields memorial) to the east.

The Dakota's developer Edward Cabot Clark, who headed sewing machine firm Singer Manufacturing Company, selected the building's site based on several characteristics. The building is on the crest of the West Side plateau, which overlooks much of Manhattan. Additionally, 72nd Street is 100 ft (30 m) wide, making it one of several major crosstown streets in the Manhattan street grid. Clark also developed 27 row houses on 72nd and 73rd streets, adjacent to the Dakota, which are no longer extant. The two developments were part of Clark's larger plan for a cohesive neighborhood; the row houses were in the middle of the block, where land values were lower, whereas the Dakota was built on the more valuable site next to Central Park. Clark developed another set of row houses at 13–65 and 103–151 West 73rd Street, some of which still exist. (Note: 15A–19, 41–65, and 101–103 West 73rd Street are still extant.) All of these houses were designed by Henry Janeway Hardenbergh.

The Dakota is one of several apartment buildings on Central Park West that are primarily identified by an official name. Even though a street address was sufficient to identify these apartment buildings, this trend followed a British practice of giving names to buildings without addresses. By contrast, buildings on Fifth Avenue, along the eastern side of Central Park, are mainly known by their addresses. Unlike other large apartment buildings on Central Park West, the Dakota was not named after a previous building on the site. Christopher Gray of The New York Times described the Dakota as one of several apartment buildings that were famous enough "to maintain their names simply in common custom".

== Architecture ==
The Dakota was designed by Hardenbergh for Clark and built between 1880 and 1884. The construction process involved several contractors including stonemason John L. Banta, plumber T. Brieu, iron supplier Post & McCord, carpenter J. L. Hamilton, stonework supplier J. Gillis Se Son and Henry Wilson, and woodwork contractor Pottier & Stymus.

There is disagreement over the building's architectural style. CNBC and writers Sarah Bradford Landau and Carl W. Condit described the building as being built in a German Renaissance Revival style, but a contemporary source described the building's design as being patterned after "the period of Francis I". The writer Elizabeth Hawes said in 1993 that the building had been characterized as "Brewery Brick Victorian neo-Gothic Eclectic". The building's design includes deep roofs with dormers, terracotta spandrels and panels, niches, balconies, and balustrades. The designs of the dormers, roofs, and windows were influenced by the Northern Renaissance style.

The Dakota is a nine-story building; most of the building is seven stories high, although there are also two-story gables and garrets (attics) rising up to four stories. Some contemporary sources described the building as being ten stories high, including the raised basement, while others classify the Dakota as being eight stories high. The Dakota measures 185 ft (56 m) tall and was the tallest building in the neighborhood when it was constructed. Due to the apartments' high ceilings, the Dakota's height was equivalent to that of a standard 15-story building.

=== Courtyards ===
==== Main courtyard ====
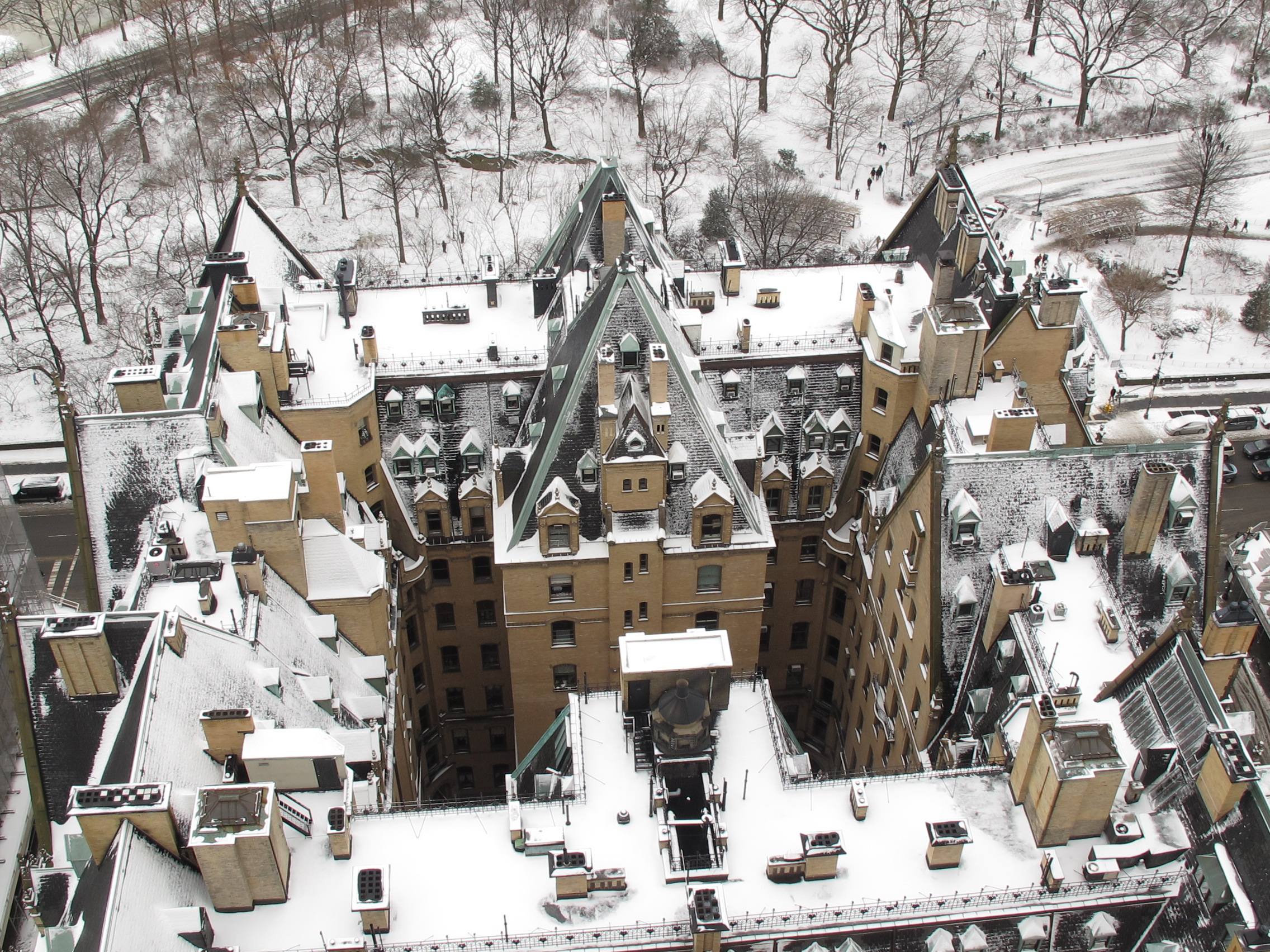
The roof of the Dakota during winter, with the H-shaped central courtyard

The building is largely square in plan and built around a central H-shaped courtyard. The space measures 90 ft (27 m) long and up to 55 ft (17 m) wide. The courtyard provides entry to all apartments and doubles as a light court for the interiors of each apartment. A writer for the American Architect and Building News described the Dakota's courtyard and similar spaces in other buildings as "a safe, pleasant and sheltered place, under the eye of the Janitor, where tenants can enter, but thieves cannot...". The writer also suggested that children could play within the courtyard, but other, unidentified observers believed such a usage attracted unsolicited attention. The apartments are accessed by four passageways, one from each corner of the courtyard. The main courtyard also functioned as a meeting area for residents, since the rest of the building was designed with "the utmost in personal privacy" as a consideration. Over the years, the courtyard has hosted events such as parties and Christmas carols.

A glass breezeway ran along the western portion of the courtyard. This breezeway had been installed during the 1920s to protect residents from inclement weather. When the courtyard was rebuilt in 2004, the sidewalk under the breezeway was reconstructed with bluestone pavers that measure up to 6 ft (1.8 m) long and 5 in (130 mm) thick. The Dakota's courtyard originally contained two fountains, which doubled as skylights for the basement. Horse-drawn carriages, entering from 72nd Street, used the courtyard to turn around. After automobiles supplanted horse-drawn carriages, the Dakota banned automobiles from the courtyard because the space could not support the weight of modern vehicles. The deck of the courtyard was entirely replaced in 2004 because the steel beams that supported it had corroded severely. The modern courtyard is a reinforced-concrete slab, which is covered by granite pavers.

A service driveway also runs along the western side of the main courtyard. The driveway descends to the basement, where there is a lower courtyard with the same dimensions as the ground-level courtyard. This driveway was originally used to deliver goods and "commodities of housekeeping", as well as remove garbage and ashes. All servants entered and exited the Dakota through this driveway. The Dakota's distinct upper and lower courtyards differed from that of Hardenbergh and Clark's earlier Van Corlear apartment house at Seventh Avenue and 55th Street, where residents and servants used the same courtyard.

==== Other spaces ====
To the west of the Dakota was another garden; both the Dakota and the adjacent row houses were served by a mechanical plant below the garden. The placement of the mechanical plant outside the building was a deliberate measure to reassure residents in case the machinery exploded. There were also tennis and croquet courts within the garden. Images show that the garden was surrounded by a fence, and the area above the mechanical plant was further enclosed by a hedge. The garden had become a parking lot by the 1950s, and the Mayfair apartment building was developed on the garden's site in 1964.

The building is surrounded by a recessed areaway, also described as a dry moat. The areaway was intended to increase residents' safety, as well as allow natural light and air to enter the basement. An entrance to the New York City Subway's 72nd Street station, served by the B and C trains, is built within this areaway. A cast-iron fence separates the areaway from the sidewalk. The sidewalk was originally made of bluestone slabs.

=== Facade ===
Each elevation of the facade is divided vertically into bays. There are 11 bays on 72nd Street to the south and Central Park West to the east; 13 bays on 73rd Street to the north; and 17 bays to the west. The Dakota's raised basement is clad with sandstone. The remainder of the facade is made of buff brick, except on the west elevation, which is made of red brick; all of the brick is laid in common bond. The Dakota's use of soft-hued buff brick contrasted with the facade of the Van Corlear, which was a "harsh red". The facade also contains Nova Scotia sandstone trim and terracotta detailing. The materials and colors were selected to not only complement each other but also to soften the appearance of the building's shadows and massing. The large amount of ornament created the impression of variety between different parts of the facade. The west elevation, facing the former yard, was sparsely ornamented. The exterior walls function as load-bearing walls, which measure up to 4 ft (1.2 m) thick. The exterior walls taper from 28 to 16 inches (710 to 410 mm) on upper stories.

==== Entrances ====
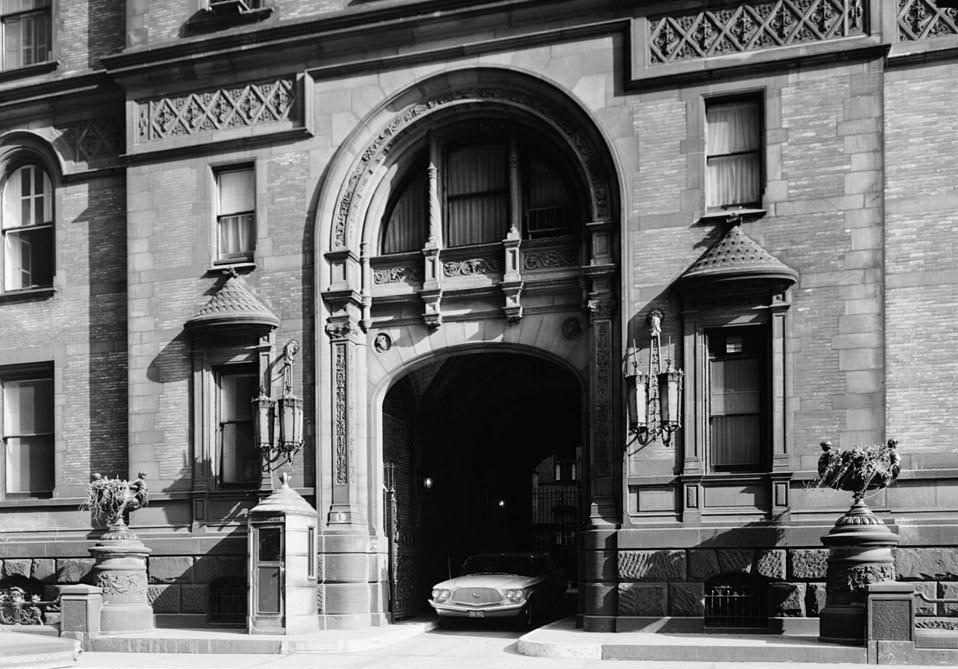
Archival photograph of the main entrance in 1965

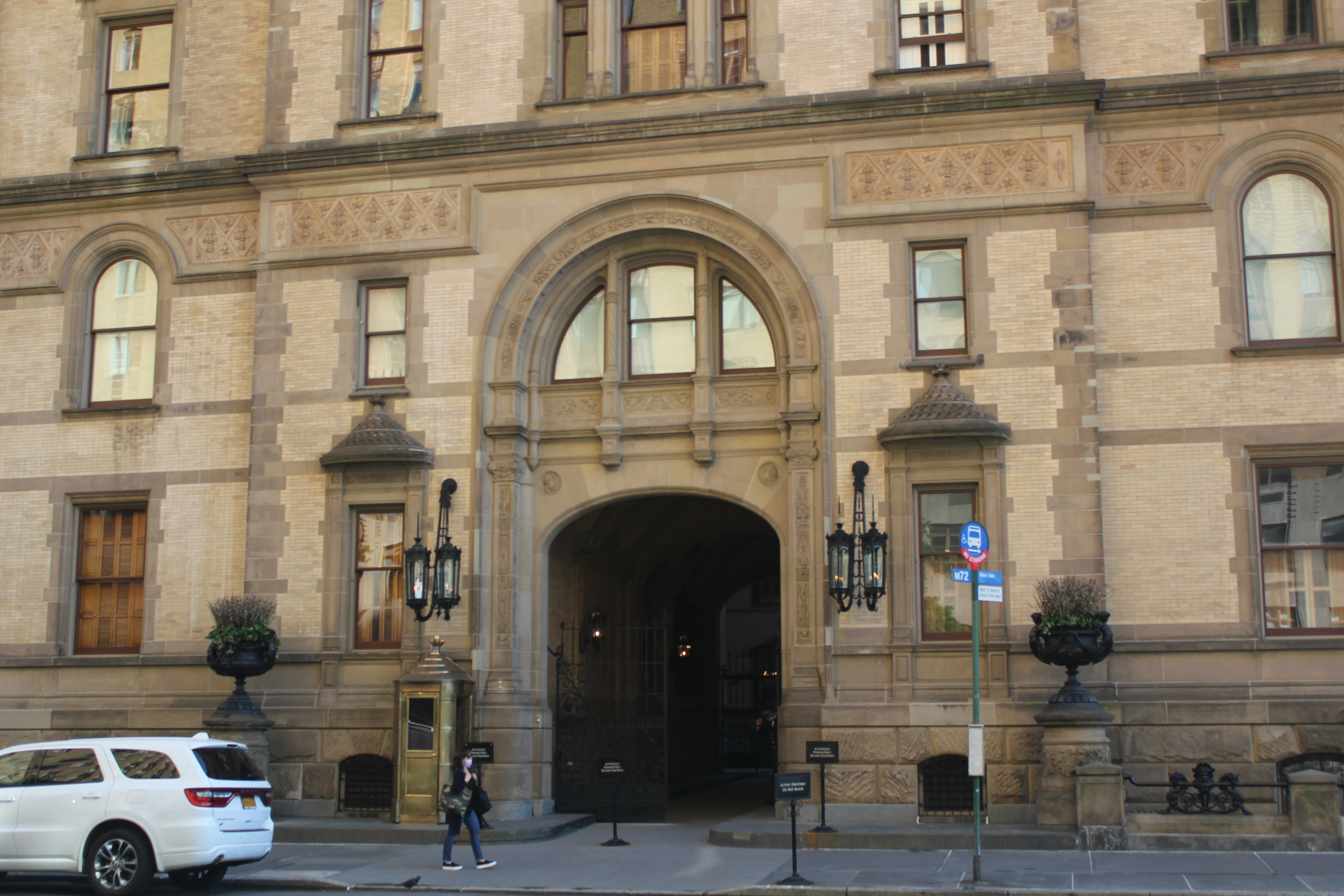
The same location in 2022

The building's main entrance is a double-height archway on 72nd Street to the south. It measures 16 ft (4.9 m) wide and 20 ft (6.1 m) tall. The archway is flanked by pedestals with metal urns, and there is a Diocletian window in the upper portion of the archway. There is also a security guard's booth to the west of the main entrance. After midnight, residents and visitors are required to ring the security guard to enter the building. Portraits of a man and woman (probably Edward C. Clark's partner Isaac Merritt Singer and Isaac's wife Isabella Boyer Singer) are placed above the doorway.

The 72nd Street entrance is a porte-cochère large enough for horse-drawn carriages to drop off passengers. Many of the horse-drawn carriages were dispatched from the now-demolished Dakota Stables at 75th Street and Amsterdam Avenue, developed by Edward C. Clark's son Alfred Corning Clark. Inside the archway is a groin-vaulted vestibule that leads to the courtyard. There are metal gates on either end of the vestibule. Architectural Record likened the 72nd Street entrance to a "fortress entry".

A "handsome doorway", measuring 10 ft (3.0 m) tall, also led from 73rd Street to the courtyard. The northern entrance on 73rd Street was seldom used except for funerals.

==== Upper stories ====
The 72nd Street elevation contains projecting turrets, which rise the entire height of the facade. A depiction of a Native American's head is carved on the facade. Above the second story is a horizontal band course made of terracotta. The band course is decorated with a diaper pattern. Above the sixth story is a stone cornice, which separates the seventh story and the roof from the rest of the facade. The cornice is supported by large brackets and is topped by an ornate metal balustrade.

The building is topped by gables at each of its corners. The 72nd Street elevation also has a gable above the central entrance. On Central Park West, the central section of the roof is a hip roof. Originally, arched balconies connected the gables. The roof is covered with slate tiles. Dormer windows and corbeled brick chimneys protrude from the roof at multiple locations. The dormer windows are arranged in two to four levels and alternately contain either stone or copper frames. There are also turrets, finials, and flagpoles along the roof.

=== Structural features ===
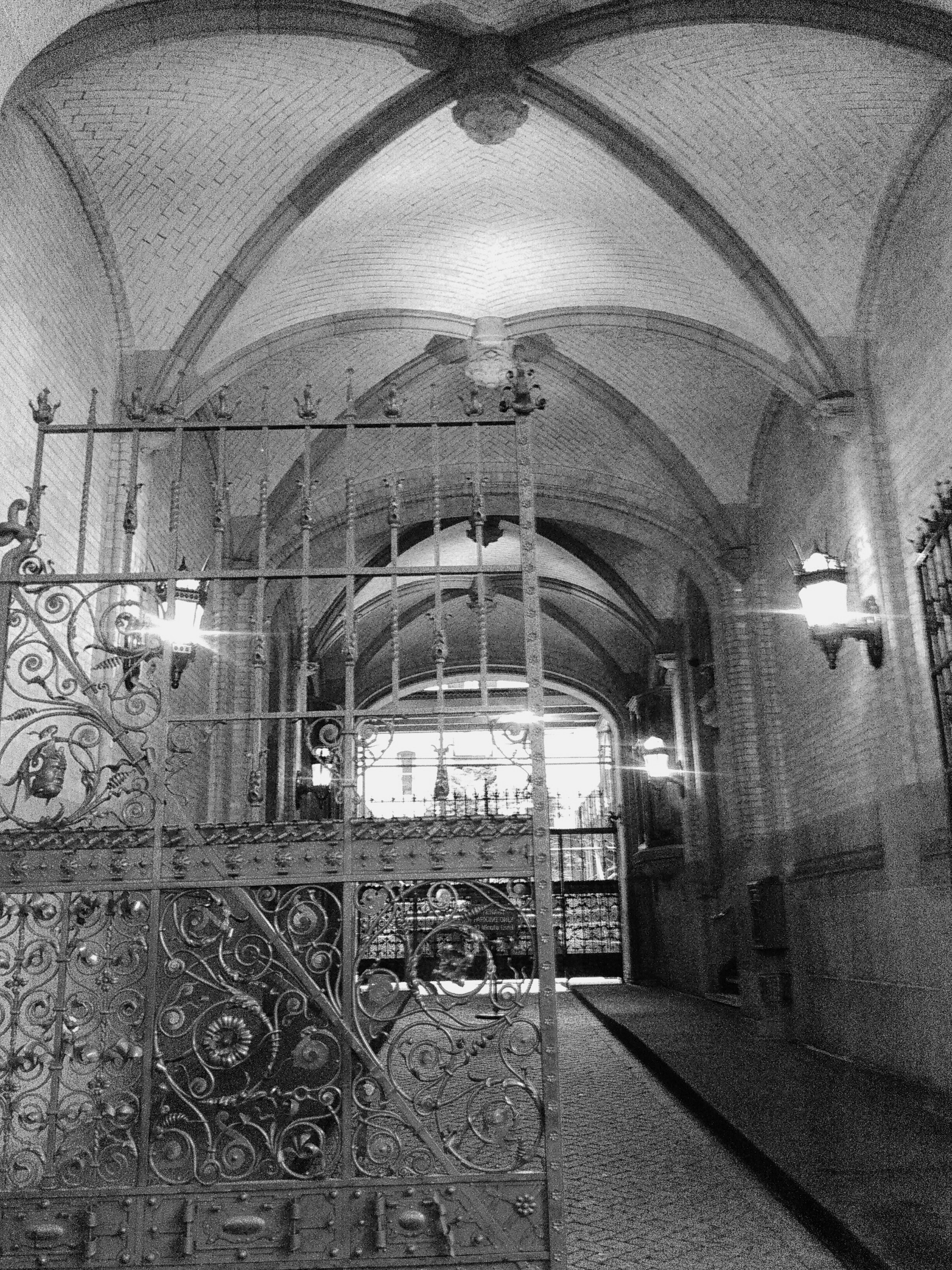
Vaulted driveway leading into the courtyard

The Dakota was designed as a fireproof structure. According to construction plans, the foundation walls were made of bluestone blocks, extended 10 to 18 ft (3.0 to 5.5 m) deep, and measured 3 to 4 ft (0.91 to 1.22 m) thick. The perimeter walls tapered in thickness from 28 in (710 mm) at the first story to 16 in (410 mm) above the sixth story. (Note: The thicknesses of the exterior walls varied at different stories: First story: 24 to 28 in (610 to 710 mm); Second to fourth stories: 20 to 24 in (510 to 610 mm); Fifth and sixth stories: 16 to 20 in (410 to 510 mm); Seventh to ninth stories: 12 to 16 in (300 to 410 mm)) The superstructure includes rolled steel beams on each floor, spaced every 3 to 4 ft (0.91 to 1.22 m) and measuring 6 to 12 in (150 to 300 mm) deep. Between these rolled beams were brick or terracotta arches. The floor surfaces consist of 9 in-thick (23 cm) earthen subfloors above 9-inch-thick slabs of concrete. Partitions in the hallways are made of "fireproof blocks", while partitions in other parts of the building are made of either "fireproof blocks" or brick. The thick walls, floor slabs, and partitions also provided noise insulation. The strength of the Dakota's superstructure rivaled that of contemporary office buildings.

The mechanical plant to the west measured 150 by 60 by 18 ft (45.7 by 18.3 by 5.5 m) and contained electrical generators, steam boilers, and steam engines. The plant's roof was constructed of brick arches and iron beams, and the garden was planted above it. The generators became obsolete in the 1890s after the neighborhood was connected to the city's power grid, and the boilers and engines were relocated to the Dakota's basement. The steam plant in the basement, as well as the building's hydraulic elevators, were powered by water that was collected from the roof and from underneath each apartment's radiators. The radiators in each apartment were placed under the window sills.

The basement had a coal bunker with a capacity of 1,000 short tons (910 t). From the beginning, the building was equipped with "a complete system of electric communication", including electric bells that were used to request the elevators. The Dakota had telegraph wires leading to a florist's shop, a fire station, a nearby stable, and the messenger's and telegraph offices. There were 300 electric bells and 4,000 electric lights, all powered by the mechanical plant. The attic had six water tanks, each with a capacity of 5,000 U.S. gal (19,000 L). The pumps could draw up to 2×10^{6} U.S. gal (7,600,000 L) of water per day, and over 200 mi (320 km) of pipes delivered water to each apartment.

=== Interior ===
==== Hallways, elevators, and stairs ====
The passageways from the courtyard lead to ground-level spaces with wooden paneling and marble wainscoting. Between the first and second stories, the walls of the staircases are wainscoted with marble. The hallways on the upper stories are wainscoted in wood, while the ceilings and walls are made of plaster. Because the Dakota was one of the city's earliest luxury apartment buildings, the floor plans resembled those of traditional row houses. Consequently, the hallways were generally long and narrow at the Dakota, compared with later developments such as 998 Fifth Avenue. In any case, because the Dakota had four entrances with their own elevators and stairs, there were very few public hallways on the upper stories. This gave residents a feeling of privacy, since tenants were largely separated both from each other and from servants.

The interior has eight elevators, four each for residents and servants. At each corner of the courtyard, four wrought-bronze staircases and four residents' elevators lead from the entrances to the upper stories. Each corner of the building has a brick shaft with one elevator and one staircase; this roughly divides the Dakota into quadrants. The tenants' staircases contained marble treads. The elevator cabs were manufactured by Otis Elevators and were finished in mahogany. In the original plans, each elevator served two apartments per floor. Each elevator served a small foyer on each floor that provided access to the two apartments. These foyers were intended to be "almost as private and convenient" as entrances to typical brownstone row houses. In some cases, an elevator served only one apartment on a floor, so the elevator doors opened directly into that tenant's foyer.

In place of dumbwaiters, the building contains four service elevators and four iron staircases for servants. The service elevators and staircases are placed near the center of each side of the courtyard. Each service stair and elevator served two apartments per floor. The service elevators, among the first in the city, lead to the kitchens of the apartments. All of the elevators were originally hydraulic cabs with water tanks at the bottom.

==== Apartments ====
===== Layouts =====
Each of the Dakota's apartments had a unique layout and contained four to twenty rooms. (Note: Sources disagree on the number of apartments that the Dakota originally had. Reynolds 1994, p. 229, and Stern, Mellins & Fishman 1999, p. 561, give a figure of 85 apartments; a contemporary source cited in National Park Service 1976, p. 6 mentions 65 apartments; Landau & Condit 1996, p. 135 cites 58 apartments; and The Manufacturer and Builder 1882 cites 50 apartments.) The initial plans had called for six or eight apartments of about equal size on each of the seven lowest floors. The largest apartments were on the lower floors, as elevators were still a relatively new technology, and Hardenbergh thought a lower-floor apartment would be more attractive to people who had moved from townhouses. As the building was being constructed, Clark changed the specifications to accommodate individual tenants, resulting in substantial changes to the formerly standardized floor layouts. Look magazine characterized the differing apartment layouts as a legacy of the "rugged individualism" that had been common when the Dakota opened. The Dakota's construction drawings are no longer extant, so the original arrangement of the apartments is known only from written descriptions. Many floor plans for individual apartments have been published over the years, and the Dakota's modern floor plans have been reconstructed based on these documents. Many of the original apartments have been subdivided, though the Dakota's co-op board has endorsed numerous renovations that restored an apartment's original floor plans.

There were either nearly 500 rooms or 623 rooms in total. While most of the building contained fully-equipped apartments, with their own entrances and service elevators/stairs, part of the second floor was divided into smaller apartments and guest rooms. Apartments had a reception area, a drawing room, a library, a kitchen, a pantry, a bath, four bedrooms, one full bathroom, and butlers' and maids' quarters. Larger apartments had up to nine bedrooms, as well as additional spaces like a billiards room, boudoir, or library. Some of the apartments also have balconies, which blend in with the building's overall design. Clark's apartment on the sixth floor had 18 rooms, including a drawing room that rivaled the design of the ground-floor dining room, in addition to 17 fireplaces. In the book New York 1880, architect Robert A. M. Stern and his co-authors wrote that Clark's apartment was intended to attract row house occupants by "dramatiz[ing] the value of height".

====== Materials and dimensions ======
Ceiling heights ranged from 15 ft (4.6 m) at the first story to 12 ft (3.7 m) at the eighth story. The largest drawing room in the building was 49 ft (15 m) long and contained a classical fluted column instead of a partition. Parlors were generally either 25 by 40 ft (7.6 by 12.2 m) or 15 by 27 ft (4.6 by 8.2 m). Typical antechambers in the Dakota measured 12 by 12 ft (3.7 by 3.7 m); drawing rooms, 18 by 20 ft (5.5 by 6.1 m); bedrooms, 14 by 22 ft (4.3 by 6.7 m); and dining rooms, 12 by 20 ft (3.7 by 6.1 m).

Each apartment contained fixtures and materials that were similar to those in contemporary brownstone row houses. The kitchens and bathrooms contained modern fixtures, though other decorations such as moldings, woodwork, and floor surfaces were similar to those in many row houses. The parqueted floors are inlaid with mahogany, oak, and cherry, which are laid on top of the earthen subfloors and concrete slabs. Each apartment's dining rooms, reception rooms, and libraries were wainscoted in oak, mahogany, and other woods. The kitchens had marble wainscoting and Minton tile, while the bathrooms contained porcelain bathtubs. Other decorations included wood-burning fireplaces with tiled hearths; brass fixtures; and carved mirrors and mantels. Some apartments had plaster ceilings. Some of the Dakota's interior decorations, such as carved marble fireplace mantels, were uncommon even in mansions of the time. The decorations, along with the apartments' layouts, were intended to give the apartments a "palatial" feel.

Residents customized their apartments to fit their needs and, in some cases, their occupations. A Look magazine article in the 1960s described interior designer and antique dealer Frederick P. Victoria as having decorated his apartment with wood "draperies" and antique clocks. Artist Giora Novak occupied a minimalist space within the building's former dining room, which he decorated with his own artwork, while interior designer Ward Bennett repurposed a servant's living area under the roof as a studio. Dancer Rudolf Nureyev placed classical paintings in his living room and theatrical artwork in other rooms. Some units have been substantially redesigned; for example, a four-bedroom unit was renovated in the modern style in the 2010s.

==== Other features ====
The Dakota's basement contained a laundry, storerooms, a kitchen, and the mechanical plant. The main section of the basement is directly under the courtyard and has an asphaltum floor. On one side of the basement were heated and illuminated storerooms in which tenants could store items for free. There was also a wine cellar, which was empty by the 1960s. The quarters of the house staff were in the basement and included bedrooms; bathrooms and dining rooms for men and women; and a smoking room and reading room for men. Residents could also order food from the basement kitchen to be delivered to their rooms. After World War II, the kitchen was closed and became a studio apartment for Giora Novak.

The building had several common areas for residents, including a dining room and a ballroom. The first floor contained the building's main dining room, as well as a smaller private dining room and a reception room. The floors were made of inlaid tiles of marble, while the walls had English oak wainscoting, above which were bronze bas-reliefs. The ceiling was also made of carved English oak. On one side of the dining room was a fireplace with a Scotch brownstone mantel, giving the room the quality of an "old English baronial hall". The original plans had called for the dining area to be accessible to the general public, but the plans were modified before the building opened, and the dining room only served residents. The Dakota also had a ladies' reception room with an artwork. There was a florist, a messengers' office, and a telegraph office for residents.

The Dakota's in-house staff included a house manager, doormen, chambermaids, janitors, hall servants, and repairmen. In addition to the Dakota's in-house staff, each tenant could employ up to five of their own servants on site, though residents typically had up to three servants. Other staff, such as laundry workers, manicurists, and hairdressers, did not live in the building. Servants employed by the residents, as well as visiting servants, occupied the eighth and ninth floors. The upper-story servants' quarters contained dormitories, bathrooms, laundry rooms, and dryer rooms. The servants' quarters had been converted into apartments by the 1950s. Beside servants' quarters, there was a playroom and a gymnasium on the roof, which was labeled as the "tenth story".

== History ==
The construction of Central Park in the 1860s spurred construction on the Upper East Side of Manhattan, but similar development on the Upper West Side was slower to come. This was in part because of the West Side's steep topography and its dearth of attractions compared with the East Side. In the late 19th century, hundreds of empty lots were available along the west side of Central Park. Major developments on the West Side were erected after the Ninth Avenue elevated line opened in 1879, providing direct access to Lower Manhattan. A group of businessmen formed the West Side Association the same year. Edward C. Clark believed that the line's presence would encourage the growth of a middle-class neighborhood on the West Side. At a speech in December 1879, Clark told the West Side Association: "There are but few persons who are princely enough to wish to occupy an entire palace ... but I believe there are many who would like to occupy a portion of a great building." In the decade before the Dakota was built, the city's population had increased by at least 100 percent, but the Upper West Side contained only a few assorted saloons, inns, and other buildings.

The modern-day Dakota Apartments was one of the first large developments on the Upper West Side, built at a time when large apartment blocks were still associated with tenement living. The Dakota is also New York City's oldest surviving luxury apartment building, although it was not the first such structure to be built in the city. Only a few large apartment houses in the city predated the Dakota, including the Manhattan Apartments (built in 1880) and Windermere Apartments (built in 1883). During the early 19th century, apartment developments in the city were generally associated with the working class, but by the late 19th century, apartments were also becoming desirable among the middle and upper classes. Between 1880 and 1885, more than ninety apartment buildings were developed in the city.

=== Development ===
In 1879, Clark announced plans for an apartment complex at the intersection of 72nd Street and Eighth Avenue (the latter of which was renamed Central Park West in 1883). At the time, the vast majority of development on Manhattan Island was south of 23rd Street. Clark said he wanted "to make money" from the apartment building, even though it was a speculative development that was not being built with specific tenants in mind. Hardenbergh filed plans for an eight-story "Family Hotel" at the site in September 1880, at which point it was planned to cost one million dollars. Hardenbergh simultaneously designed several dozen low-rise row houses for Clark on 73rd Street. The row houses and the large apartment building were part of a larger plan that Clark had for the Upper West Side. John Banta was hired as the apartment house's general contractor. In early October 1880, about two weeks before construction began, the Real Estate Record and Guide reported that the building was to be a "residential hotel" with between 40 and 50 suites, each with five to twenty rooms.

Construction commenced at the end of October 1880. The building initially did not have a name, even after the foundations were completed in early 1881. By that October, the building had been constructed to the second story, although the Real Estate Record wrote that "it is hardly to be expected that it will be under roof before the winter sets in". As part of the project, Clark also excavated an Artesian well measuring about 365 ft (111 m) deep and 8 in (200 mm) wide. Work was slightly delayed by a labor strike in March 1882. The exterior walls were up to the sixth story by that May, and the builders estimated that the edifice would be completed in 18 months.

The building was renamed the "Dakota" by June 1882. At the time, the development was still within a rural part of Manhattan. One story claims that the name arose because it was remote like the Dakota Territory was. Though the Clark family never denied this story, its veracity is disputed, as contemporary publications did not discuss the building's remoteness. The earliest recorded appearance of this claim was in 1933, when the Dakota's longtime manager told the New York Herald Tribune: "Probably it was called 'Dakota' because it was so far west and so far north". The more likely origin for the "Dakota" name was Clark's fondness for the names of the then-new western states and territories. Back in 1879, Clark had proposed naming the Upper West Side's north-south avenues after states or territories in the Western United States, though his suggestions had been ignored. (Note: In particular, he proposed the following names: Central Park West – Montana Place; Columbus (9th) Avenue – Wyoming Place; Amsterdam (10th) Avenue – Arizona Place; West End (11th) Avenue – Idaho Place) The Dakota's remoteness did directly give rise to the nickname "Clark's Folly".

Clark died in 1882 and bequeathed the apartment complex to his oldest grandson, Edward Severin Clark, who at the time was 12 years old. After Edward C. Clark's death, Hardenbergh never designed another building for the Clark family; their final collaboration, the Ontiora at Seventh Avenue and 55th Street, was similar in design to the Dakota. Work on the Dakota was delayed in August 1883 when the plasterers went on strike to protest the employment of non-union laborers at the site. Other tradesmen joined the strike but returned to work within a month. The mechanical equipment was being installed in the building by March 1884. The Real Estate Record said the next month: "The 'Dakota' is at last near completion and is receiving its finishing touches prior to its opening in May, when it will be quite ready for dwelling purposes." In September 1884, the Real Estate Record reported that the Dakota "will be ready for occupancy October 1" at a yearly rent of $1,500 to $5,000 (equivalent to between $54,000 and $179,000 in 2025) and that one-quarter of the units had already been rented. Elizabeth Hawes wrote that Clark promoted the Dakota as offering "convenience, a short-cut route to opulent living with none of the problems of upkeep, and at a fraction of the expense that went with owning a private house".

=== Clark family ownership ===
==== 1880s and 1890s ====
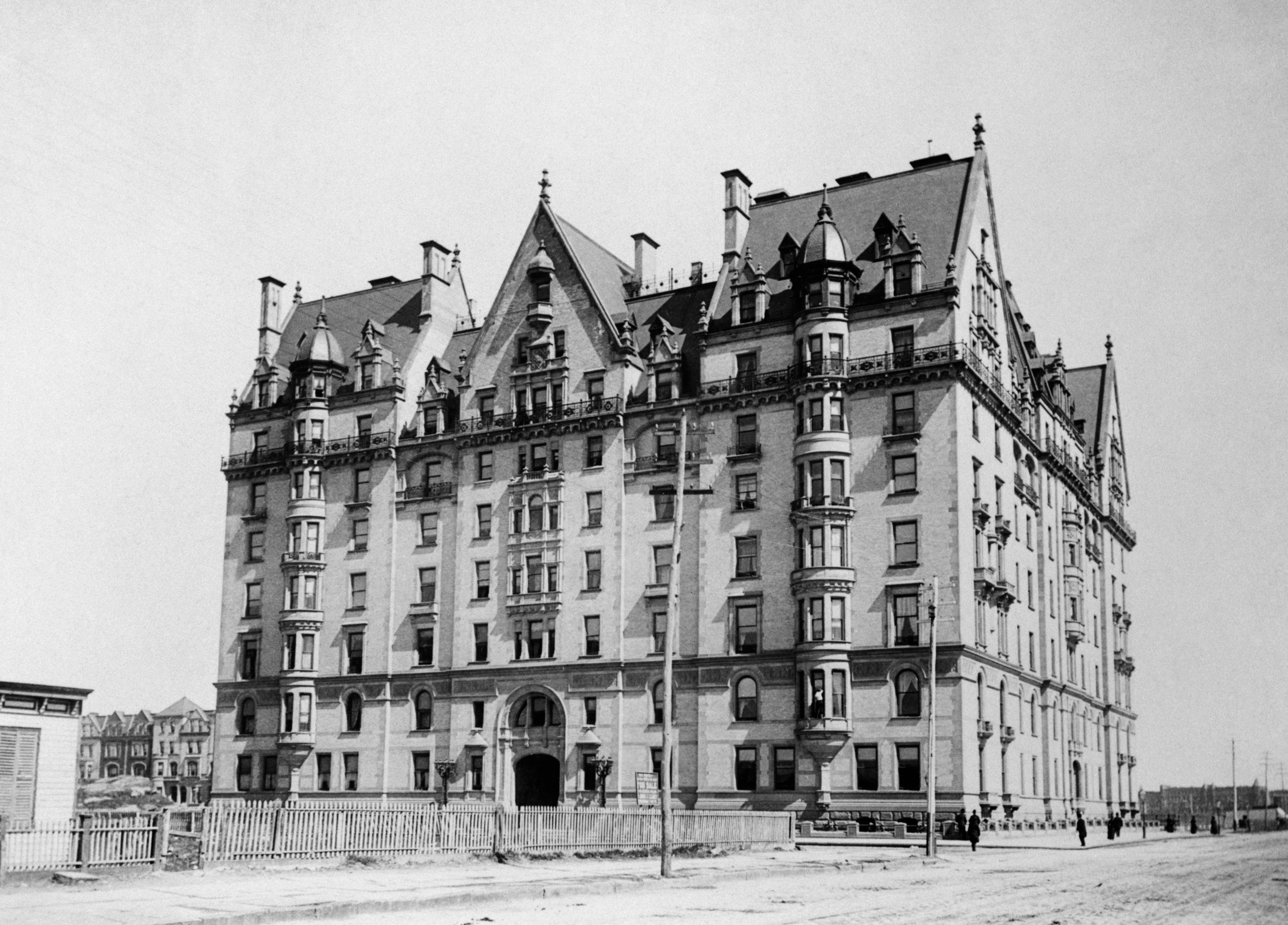
The Dakota as seen from Eighth Avenue circa 1890. The Upper West Side was sparsely developed; the only other buildings visible are Clark's row houses on 73rd Street to the left.

The Dakota was completed by the week of October 24–27, 1884. The building was fully rented upon its completion, though detractors considered the building to be isolated and criticized the Dakota as an "intrusion" onto Central Park's landscape. According to historical records, the Dakota's earliest residents were active in a variety of industries. The residents included lawyers, brokers, merchants, and clothiers, although they also included a cigar merchant, a coal-mine operator, and a stenographer. All of the Dakota's residents were wealthy, although not particularly famous. None of the early residents were included in the "Four Hundred", a list of prominent individuals in New York society during the Gilded Age. This was because of its remoteness; in the days before telephones became popular, people tended to make in-person social visits. It often took an hour just to reach the Dakota from the Ladies' Mile Historic District, which in the 1890s was the city's commercial center.

A law, restricting the height of large apartment houses in New York City to 80 feet (24 m), (Note: This was the height limit for wider streets. Apartment buildings were limited to 70 feet (21 m) on narrower streets.) passed the year that the building was completed. The Dakota's address was originally 301 West 72nd Street, since the address numbers of buildings on Manhattan's west–east numbered streets were based on the building's distances from Fifth Avenue. In 1886, house numbers on the Upper West Side were renumbered based on distance from Central Park West (Eighth Avenue), so the Dakota became 1 West 72nd Street. In its first two years, the Dakota was not profitable, and the surrounding blocks were still not developed, particularly the lots to the north. Even in 1890, the row houses on the same block were bringing more income than was the Dakota. By the early 1890s, there was a waiting list for vacant apartments.

According to the New York City Landmarks Preservation Commission (LPC), the Dakota, along with the American Museum of Natural History several blocks north, helped establish the "early character" of Central Park West. The Dakota's completion spurred the construction of other large apartment buildings in the area, several of which were named after regions in the western United States. Other buildings, including a church, fire station, and rowhouses, also were developed nearby. Nonetheless, the Dakota remained the only large apartment building in the neighborhood until the end of the 19th century. A major reason was the lack of electricity in the area, since large apartment buildings needed electricity for their elevators, but the city did not install electric ducts along Central Park West until 1896. The Dakota had its own power plant, so the lack of municipal electric service did not affect the building.

==== 1900s to 1950s ====
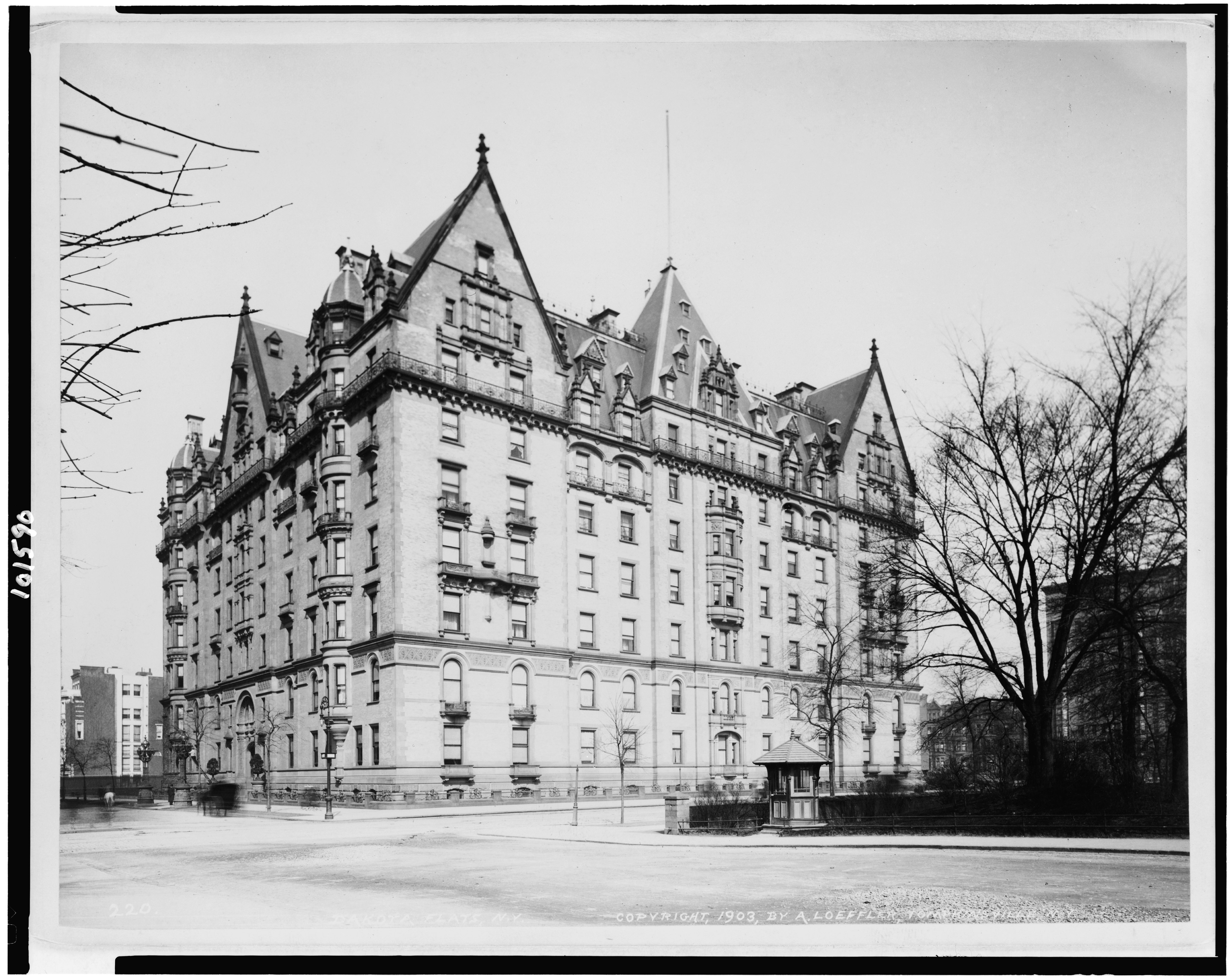
In 1903, the area was still sparsely developed, though street lamps and street signs had been added.

The Clarks tried to sell off an adjacent plot to the north, between 73rd and 74th streets, in 1902 with the proviso that no building on that site be taller than the Dakota. The Clarks were unable to sell the plot with that restriction, and the Langham apartment building was erected on the site. Images show that, in the first decades of the 20th century, some dormer windows were added on the roof of the building. Through the early 20th century, the Clark family retained ownership of the Dakota. A New York Herald Tribune article in 1929 noted that the Clarks have "for years resisted all attempts at purchase". The New York Times wrote in the 1920s that the Dakota "has always maintained its old-time popularity". Whereas the Dakota underwent few alterations in its first fifty years, the neighborhood changed dramatically during that period. The Dakota's main entrance on 72nd Street originally faced some shacks and gardens, but the high-rise Majestic Apartments overlooked the main entrance by the early 1930s.

Edward S. Clark died in 1933, just before the Dakota's 50th anniversary, and his brother Stephen Carlton Clark took over the building's operation. Stephen Clark intended to continue operating the Dakota and preserve the garden to the west. At the time, two of the tenants had lived there since its opening, and four of the other original tenants had died in the preceding three years. For the next three decades, the Dakota remained largely unchanged, and the building even retained its original elevators. The Clarks were responsible for all repairs and maintenance and were subject to little, if any, scrutiny.

By the 1950s, the servants' quarters on the upper stories had been converted to apartments. At the time, many tenants were diplomats, theatrical figures, or publishers. The building particularly appealed to theatrical figures because of its proximity to the Broadway Theater District, which was also on the West Side. There was also a long waiting list of potential tenants, and apartments rented for a relatively low $6,000 to $7,000 per year (equivalent to between $80,290 and $93,672 in 2025). Some tenants, most of whom were friends of Stephen Clark, did not pay rent at all. Residents tended to live in the building for several decades, leading The New York Times to observe: "It is reported that no Dakotan leaves the building permanently unless it is feet first".

=== Cooperative conversion ===
==== 1960s to 1980s ====
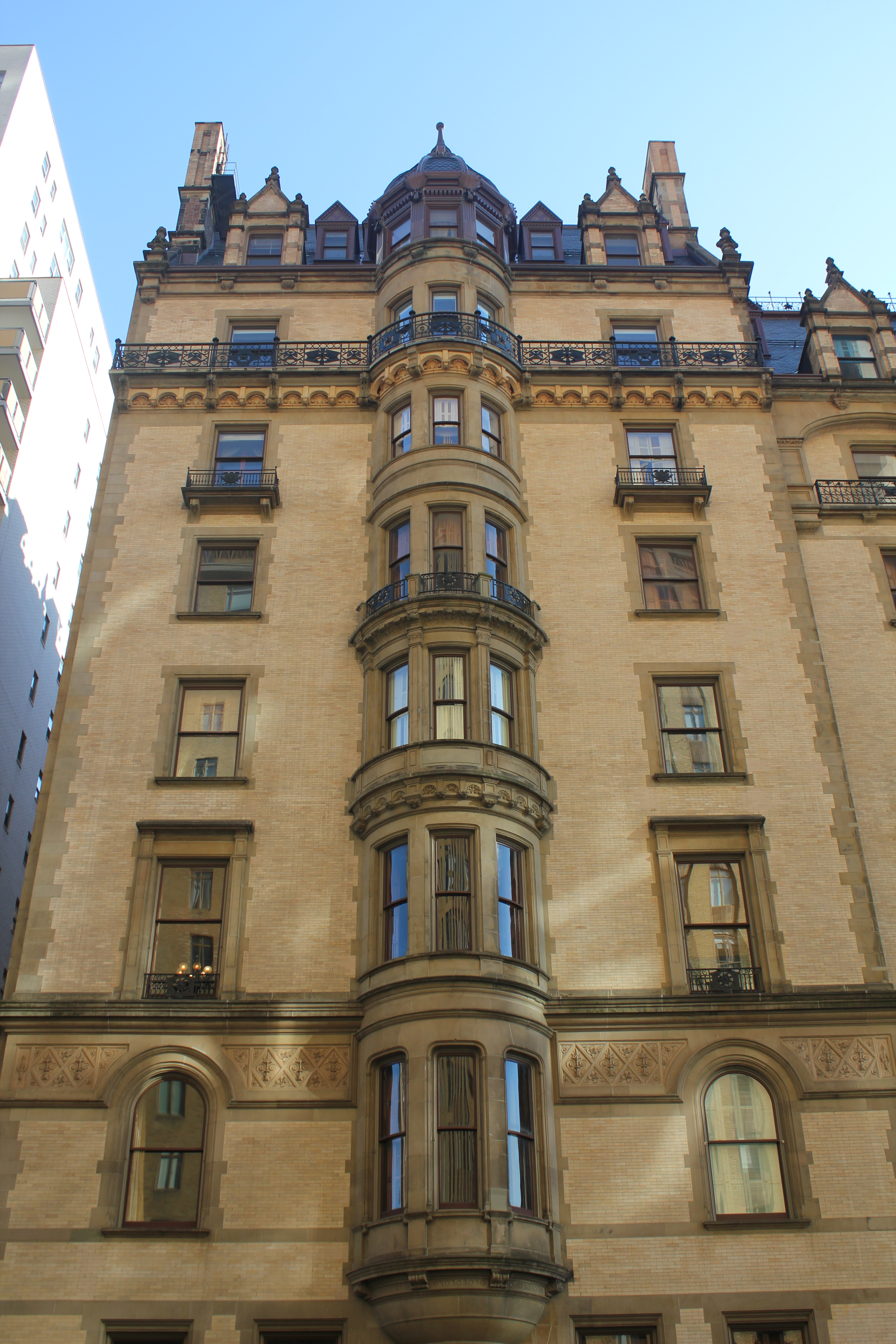
Rounded windows on 72nd Street

In January 1961, the Glickman Corporation paid $4.6 million (equivalent to $50 million in 2025) for the Dakota and an adjoining lot that contained the building's boiler room. Glickman planned to build New York City's largest apartment building on the combined site. The residents announced plans to buy the building from the Glickman Corporation in April 1961 for $4.8 million (equivalent to $52 million in 2025). Glickman dropped its plans to redevelop the Dakota and instead sold the adjacent 46,000 ft^{2} (4,300 m^{2}) site in August. That November, the Dakota's tenants bought the building, which became a cooperative. The Mayfair was completed on the adjacent site in 1964; according to The New York Times, no plans were ever filed for a larger building on the Dakota's site. Under the co-op arrangement, the residents were obligated to share all maintenance and repair costs, which the Clark family had previously handled. The Dakota was one of twelve apartment buildings on Central Park West to be converted into housing cooperatives in the late 1950s and early 1960s. By the mid-1960s, members of the co-op had to pay fees of up to $14,400 a year (equivalent to $147,117 in 2025), in addition to a one-time down payment of no more than $60,000 on their apartments (equivalent to $612,988 in 2025). At the time, the building employed about 30 staff.

The Dakota's board of directors announced in 1974 that the roof would need to be replaced, since the slate tiles had started to fall off and the copper trim had deteriorated. Since the building had been designated a New York City landmark five years prior, the New York City Landmarks Preservation Commission (LPC) had to review every proposed modification to the exterior. The LPC hired experts who determined that a full restoration would cost $1 million (equivalent to $6.53 million in 2025), which amounted to an additional $10,000 assessment for each of the Dakota's 95 tenants. The board of directors decided to instead conduct a smaller-scale renovation. The Joseph K. Blum Company added waterproofing to the Dakota's roof for $160,000 (equivalent to $1.04 million in 2025). The Dakota's board also voted in 1975 to ban the installation of air conditioners that protruded through the building's facade, since the LPC would have to approve every air conditioner that was installed.

The Dakota gained attention when John Lennon, a resident and former member of the rock band the Beatles, was shot dead outside the building on December 8, 1980. According to the Chicago Tribune, the Dakota became a makeshift memorial for Lennon, especially among fans of the Beatles. The murder also prompted concern among residents, who demanded more stringent security; all visitors were already required to pass through the security booth on 72nd Street. Years after Lennon's death, the Dakota's residents tended to eschew publicity. The Dakota's board had rejected numerous high-profile personalities who had wanted to move into the building. By then, there were 93 apartments, and the original floor plans had been rearranged extensively. Residents generally continued to live in the building for prolonged periods. The recessed areaway around the Dakota was restored in the mid-1980s, and architectural firm Glass & Glass began drawing up plans for a full restoration of the building. By the late 1980s, people in the financial industry comprised an increasing proportion of the Dakota's residents; previously, many had worked in the arts.

==== 1990s to present ====
By 1992, the Dakota's facade was being cleaned. New mortar had been applied to the brickwork in the facade, but the light color of the mortar contrasted sharply with the darkened bricks. The Dakota's board decided to repair the most deteriorated bricks rather than replace the whole facade. The project was budgeted using unit pricing, since it was impossible to know how many bricks needed to be repaired until the entire facade had been examined. The repairs ultimately cost $5 million, amounting to an average assessment of $50,000 for each tenant. The LPC gave craftsmanship awards to the restoration architects, Ehrenkrantz & Eckstut Architects and Remco, in 1994. The fireplaces were also restored in the late 1990s or early 2000s, requiring some of the fireplace flues to be replaced.

The Dakota's maintenance expenses were shared among fewer residents and tended to be much higher than at other nearby co-ops. For instance, Lennon's widow Yoko Ono paid a monthly fee of $12,566 for her 6,000 ft^{2} (560 m^{2}) apartment in 1996, while a similarly-sized apartment at the nearby San Remo had a monthly maintenance cost of $6,000. The Dakota's board announced in 2002 that it planned to restore the interior courtyard, and it hired Higgins & Quasebarth as a consulting architect. At the time, the upper level of the courtyard had severe leaks, and the breezeway on the western side of the courtyard was "practically held up by paint". The LPC approved all aspects of the planned renovation. Some residents wanted the glass breezeway in the courtyard to be removed, citing aesthetic concerns; preservationists said the general public would have not been able to see the breezeway anyway, since security had been tightened after Lennon's murder. The restoration of the courtyard started in February 2004 and was completed seven and a half months later.

High demand for units at the Dakota continued into the 21st century. The Dakota had 85 co-op units by the 2010s. Some of the smaller apartments had been combined over the years, and several units were restored to their original layouts. The building's facade was again renovated starting in 2015. The project was completed two years later for $32 million.

== Residents ==
According to a 1996 article in New York magazine, many brokers classified the Dakota as one of five top-tier apartment buildings on Central Park West, largely because of its residents, large scale, and "historical prestige". The others were 88 Central Park West, 101 Central Park West, the San Remo, and the Beresford. As at other luxury apartment buildings in New York City, some of the Dakota's residents use their units as pieds-a-terre rather than as their primary residences. Notable residents of the Dakota have included:

- Richard Adler, lyricist
- Lauren Bacall, actress
- Harley Baldwin, real estate developer and art dealer
- Walter Becker, songwriter, musician, co-founder of Steely Dan
- Stacey Bendet, fashion designer
- Ward Bennett, architect and designer
- Leonard Bernstein, composer and conductor
- Frederick Gilbert Bourne, businessman
- Amanda Burden, urban planner
- Carter Burden, politician
- Graydon Carter, former editor of Vanity Fair
- Connie Chung, newscaster
- Rosemary Clooney, singer and actress
- Harlan Coben, author
- Bob Crewe, songwriter, record producer, and artist
- Eric Eisner, producer
- José Ferrer, actor
- Roberta Flack, singer
- Buddy Fletcher, businessman
- Charles Henri Ford, poet, artist, and publisher
- Ruth Ford, actress
- Betty Friedan, feminist writer and activist
- Ketti Frings, playwright
- Judy Garland, singer and actress
- Lillian Gish, actress
- Paul Goldberger, architecture critic
- Ydessa Hendeles, art collector
- Judy Holliday, actress
- William Inge, playwright
- Charles Douglas Jackson, Time Inc. executive
- Charles Henry Jones, American journalist, editor, and political figure
- Michael Kahn, theatre director
- Boris Karloff, actor
- Sidney Kingsley, playwright
- John Lennon, musician and composer; murdered at the Dakota in 1980
- Sean Lennon, musician and composer; son of John Lennon and Yoko Ono
- Warner LeRoy, businessman
- John Madden, football coach and commentator
- Marya Mannes, author and critic
- Henry Masterson III, philanthropist
- Frederick S. Mates, financier
- Albert Maysles, documentary filmmaker
- John B. McDonald, contractor who worked on the first line of the New York City Subway
- Jo Mielziner, theatrical set designer
- Walter Millis, writer
- Joe Namath, football player
- Rudolf Nureyev, dancer
- Carroll O'Connor, actor
- Rosie O'Donnell, actress and comedian
- Yoko Ono, artist, widow of John Lennon; lived there until 2023
- Jack Palance, actor
- Ruth Porat, CFO of Alphabet and Google
- Eric Portman, actor
- Maury Povich, television host
- Gilda Radner, actress and comedian
- Milos Raonic, tennis player
- Thomas Reardon, neuroscientist and technologist
- Rex Reed, critic
- Jason Robards, actor
- Jane Rosenthal, film producer
- Wilbur Ross, financier
- Robert Ryan, actor
- Zachary Scott, actor
- Eugenia Sheppard, writer
- Harper Simon, musician and composer; son of Paul Simon
- Paul Simon, musician
- Ruth P. Smith, advocate
- Michael Wager, actor
- Teresa Wright, actress

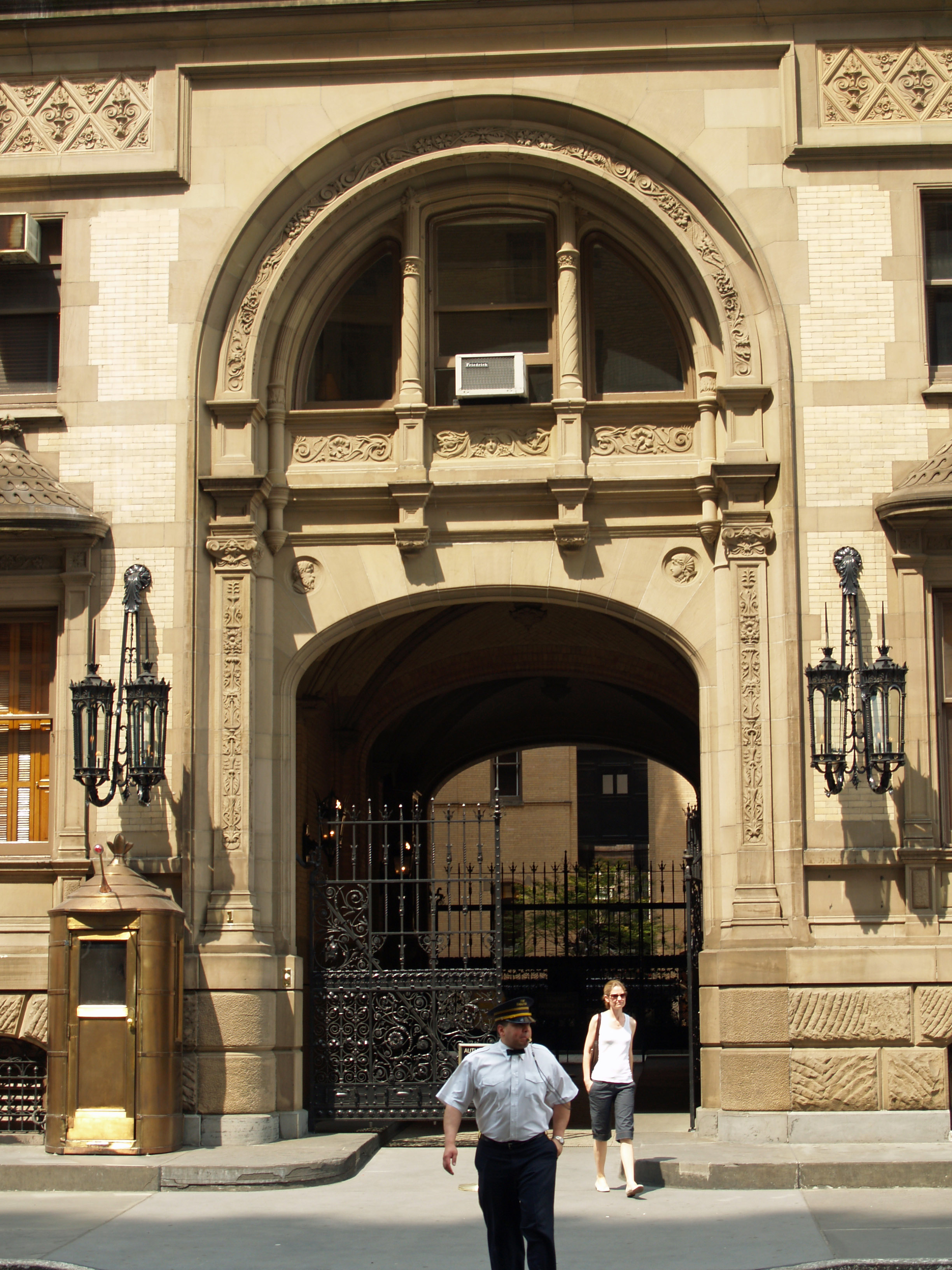
Main entrance, where John Lennon was shot

The Dakota's co-op board, which decides whether to allow prospective tenants, has a reputation for selectivity. In 2011, The Wall Street Journal characterized the board as having "high standards and aversion to notoriety". A CNBC report in 2012 noted that one set of prospective tenants had to pay several thousand dollars for a background check, as well as submit several years' worth of financial and tax documents, and that even these measures did not guarantee that the tenants would be accepted.

The Dakota's board maintains a set of house rules for residents and their guests; in 2011, The New York Times characterized several of the rules as appearing "like they could have been drafted when the building opened". For example, "domestic employees, messengers and trades people" are required to use the service elevators, and healthcare and childcare providers must be accompanied by clients when they use the passenger elevators. Other rules include a restriction against leaving more than one car unattended in the driveway; a prohibition on "dance, vocal or instrumental instruction" in apartments; and a restriction on playing musical instruments or using a phonograph, radio, or TV loudspeaker between 11 p.m. and 9 a.m. Residents cannot throw away their apartments' original fireplace mantels or doors and must instead put them in a storage area in the basement.

On numerous occasions, the board has refused to allow high-profile personalities to move into the building, including musicians Gene Simmons, Billy Joel, Carly Simon, Madonna, and Cher, as well as baseball player Alex Rodriguez, and comedian Judd Apatow. In 2002, the board rejected corrugated cardboard magnate Dennis Mehiel; he was only allowed to move into the building 20 years later. Another prospective tenant sued the Dakota's board in 2015 after the board prohibited him from moving into a unit he had bought 16 years prior. Former resident Albert Maysles, who had unsuccessfully tried to sell his unit to Melanie Griffith and Antonio Banderas, told The New York Times in 2005: "What's so shocking is that the building is losing its touch with interesting people. More and more, they're moving away from creative people and going toward people who just have the money." Investor and resident Buddy Fletcher filed a lawsuit in 2011, claiming that the board had made racist remarks against would-be residents on numerous occasions, but a New York state judge dismissed Fletcher's suit in 2015.

== Impact ==
=== Reception ===
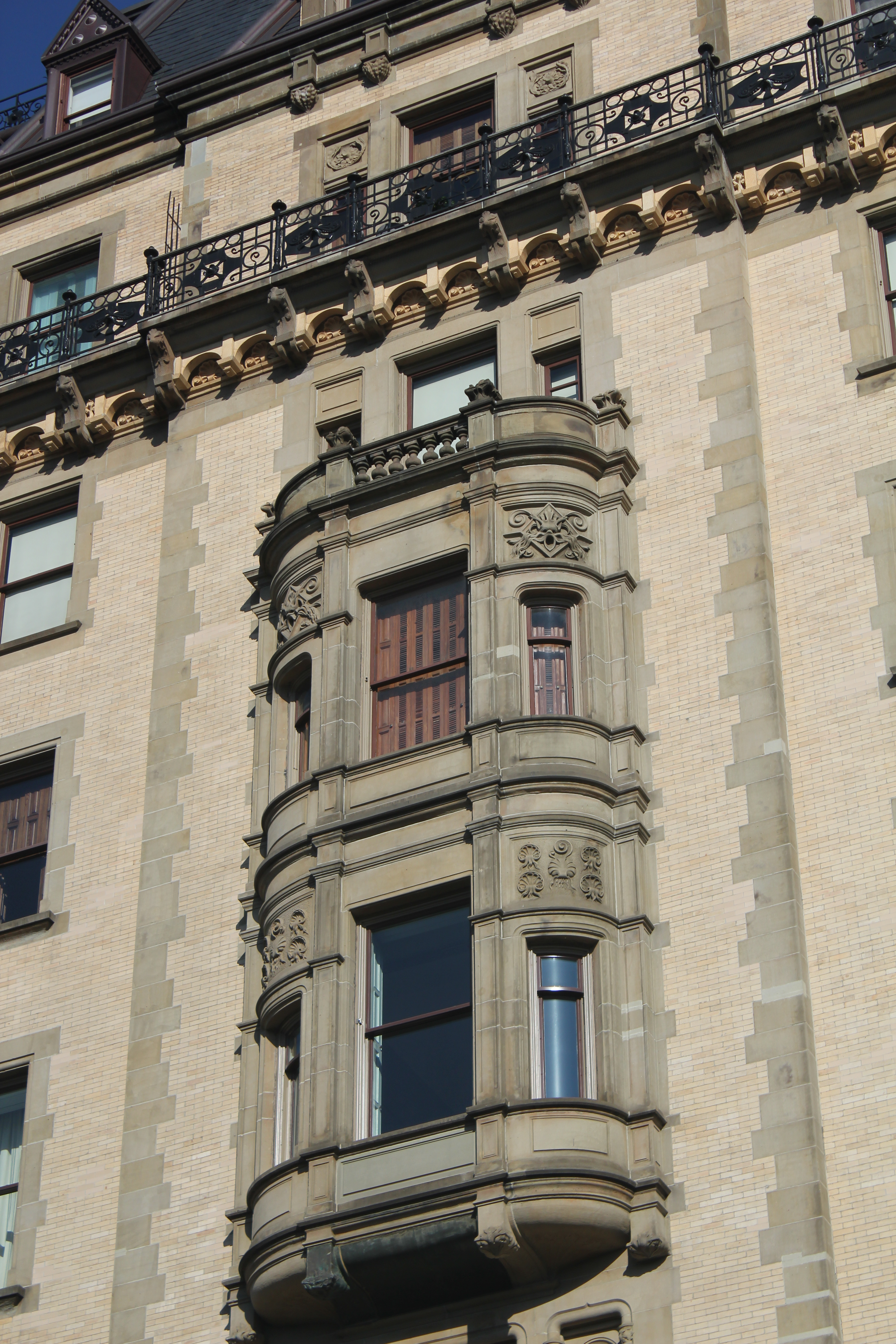
Windows on Central Park West

Before The Dakota was completed, architectural critic Montgomery Schuyler was skeptical of the building's potential, saying: "At present, it is too isolated to come to anything like an immediate favor with the wealthy classes..." By the time the Dakota opened, it was widely acclaimed. The New York Daily Graphic wrote that the building was "one of the most perfect apartment houses in the world". The Real Estate Record and Guide wrote in 1884: "The owners have been fortunate in their architect, and Mr. Hardenbergh has been fortunate in his clients." Two years later, H. W. Fabian referred to the Dakota as the "most excellent of any of the kind in New York", and M. G. Van Rensselaer said the Dakota was the only apartment building she had ever seen that "merits praise". Elizabeth Hawes said in her 1993 book New York, New York that the building looked "both important and unlikely" when it had been completed.

Schuyler, reappraising the building in 1896, said: "The architectural results were so successful that it is a very considerable distinction to have designed the best apartment house in New York." Architectural Record spoke critically of the building's high quality, saying in 1902 that the fact that the Dakota was the best-designed apartment house along Central Park West "is not especially encouraging as an architectural sign of the times". On the Dakota's 50th anniversary, the New York Herald Tribune described the building as standing "firmly on its unimpeachable foundations; somewhat shorter than its neighbors but immeasurably more impressive".

Commentary continued in later years. A New York Times article in 1959 described the Dakota's design as ranging "Victorian Kremlin" to "Middle Eastern Post Office", while Look magazine called the building a "maze of imaginative, distinctive living". Architect Robert A. M. Stern wrote in 1999: "The Dakota was an undisputed masterpiece, far and away the grandest apartment house of the Gilded Age in New York and rivaling, if not exceeding, in logic and luxury any comparable building in Paris and London". Christopher Gray said in 2006 that "The Dakota remains Mount Olympus in the mythology of New York apartment houses, its baronial majesty the gauge by which all others must be judged." The Wall Street Journal referred to the Beresford, the Dakota, and the San Remo as the "three grand dames of the West Side".

Contemporary critics also commented about specific architectural elements of the Dakota. The Real Estate Record and Guide dubbed the dining suite as "the handsomest dining room in Manhattan". American Architect and Architecture wrote: "the court-yard is symmetrically and handsomely shaped". American Architect had only one complaint: "The service-entrances to the suites are situated upon the same court-yard, so that grocers' wagons and ice-carts are almost always to be seen standing about in the space which should be reserved exclusively for more fashionable equipages, and for the promenades of the tenants of the house." Hardenbergh, who remained involved in his designs after their completion, wrote a letter objecting to American Architect's characterization of the courtyard.

=== Cultural impact and legacy ===
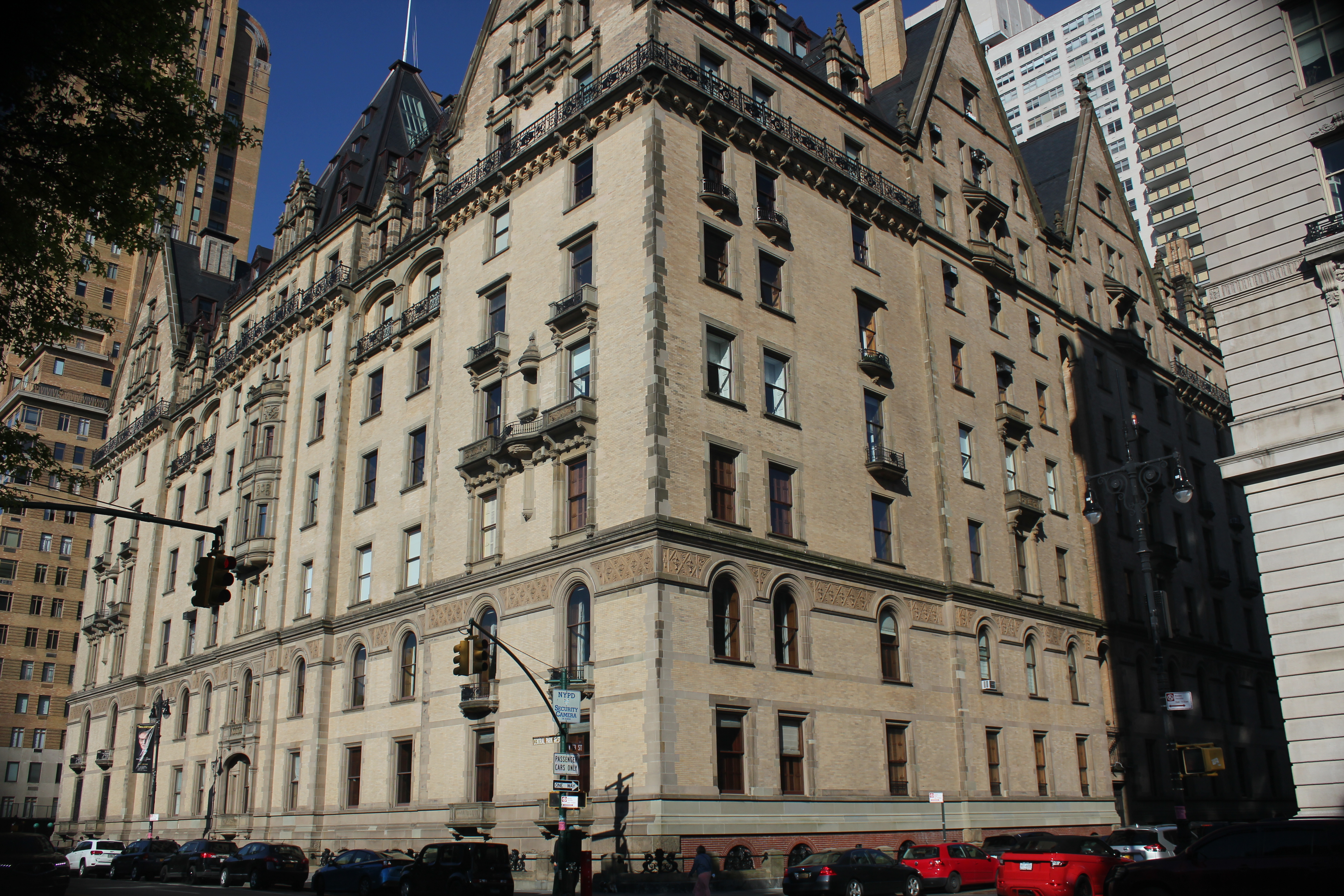
View from 73rd Street and Central Park West

Though the Dakota had an unusual design for its time, only one other luxury "communal palace" followed it: the Osborne on 57th Street. After the Dakota was completed, ornamental-iron contractor Hecla Iron Works published advertisements of the building in Architectural Record. The building and its inhabitants have been detailed in numerous periodicals, including Look and Architectural Forum. Illustrations of the building appeared on several magazine covers, including the July 12, 1982, issue of The New Yorker magazine and the 1979 Christmas catalog for Brentano's bookstore. Numerous replicas of the building have been created, including a model at Legoland Florida, as well as merchandise such as tissue boxes. The American Institute of Architects' 2007 survey List of America's Favorite Architecture ranked the Dakota among the top 150 buildings in the United States.

The Dakota's history is detailed in at least two books. Stephen Birmingham's book Life at the Dakota was published in 1979, while historian Andrew Alpern's book The Dakota: A History of the World's Best-Known Apartment Building was published in 2015. Nonetheless, relatively little scholarly material about the Dakota has been published. According to Wilbur Ross, a former president of the Dakota's board, a planned "centennial art book" about the building was canceled in 1984 because the Dakota was so poorly documented. The Dakota has also appeared in several popular media works, including Roman Polanski's 1968 film Rosemary's Baby and Bradley Cooper's Maestro. The Chicago Tribune wrote in 1980 that the "building's grim presence was introduced to most Americans" in Rosemary's Baby. The building was also depicted in Jack Finney's 1970 novel Time and Again. and in the 2017 novel The Address by Fiona Davis.

The New York City Landmarks Preservation Commission designated the Dakota as a New York City landmark in February 1969. The Dakota was also added to the National Register of Historic Places (NRHP) in 1972 and was re-added to the NRHP as a National Historic Landmark in 1976. The Dakota is also part of the Central Park West Historic District, which was designated as an NRHP district in 1982, as well as the Upper West Side Historic District, which became a New York City historic district in 1990.

== See also ==
- List of National Historic Landmarks in New York City
- List of New York City Designated Landmarks in Manhattan from 59th to 110th Streets
- National Register of Historic Places listings in Manhattan from 59th to 110th Streets
