= Ward Bennett =

American designer (1917–2003)

- Ward Bennett
- Born: Howard Bernstein; November 17, 1917; Washington Heights, Manhattan, New York
- Died: August 13, 2003 (aged 85); Key West, Florida
- Education: Académie de la Grande Chaumière
- Notable work: "University Chair"
- Style: American
- Movement: Modernism
- Parents: Murray Bernstein (father); Emelia "Emily" Einsheimer (mother)

Ward Bennett (né Howard Bernstein and also known as Howard E. Bennett, November 17, 1917 – August 13, 2003) was an American designer, artist and sculptor. The New York Times described his work as defining "an era."

== Early life and education ==
Bennett was born as Howard Bernstein on November 17, 1917 in Washington Heights, Manhattan in New York City. His father, Murray Bernstein, a.k.a. Murray Bennett, was a vaudeville actor who later became a real-estate insurance broker in 1925 and later the owner of a restaurant, though he continued to act. His mother was the former Emelia "Emily" Einsheimer. He had an elder brother, Louis Bernstein (a.k.a. Erwin Bennett). They once lived at 506 Fort Washington Avenue, Apartment 4D, in Washington Heights, a neighborhood in New York City

Bennett started working in the Garment District at age 13. He became a shipping clerk at Chin Chin Crepe. Shortly thereafter he started working for Hattie Carnegie, where he reportedly designed the costumes for Gertrude Lawrence in Lady in the Dark. After visiting Europe he decided to become a designer. He studied at Académie de la Grande Chaumière. He studied under Constantin Brâncuși.

He moved to California and worked as a window dresser. Then, he went back to New York City. He continued to do window dressing and in the evenings studied design. Hans Hofmann taught him. He shared a studio with Louise Nevelson. Bennett lived and worked in New York, New York. He had an apartment in the Dakota Building, which he redecorated frequently. His apartment was once called "the most exciting modern apartment in New York." His home in East Hampton, is called The Springs.

== Work ==
In 1944 his ceramics were in the Whitney Museum annual exhibition. After visiting and returning from Mexico, he showed his jewelry at the Museum of Modern Art. In the mid-1940s he started doing interior design. His first work was a Manhattan apartment that he designed to have floors made of cork and white bookshelves. He was known for his monochromatic schemes.

Bennett sought to create a design style that was uniquely American, versus the popular European design styles of the 1960s and 70's. His style was called "sensual minimalism" for his blending of industrial design and aesthetic look. He is considered one of the first designers to use industrial design in home design. He had designed over 100 chairs by 1979.

He also created furniture, flatware, dresses, jewelry and homes. He worked for Sasaki, Japan, Chase, David Rockefeller, Gianni Agnelli, Tiffany & Co., and Jann Wenner. In the 1970s he was resident designer at Brickel Associates.

He designed the "University Chair" for Lyndon Baines Johnson Library and Museum. As of 1979 he had designed over 100 different chairs. He had a strong interest in chair design because he had back problems of his own.

== Death and legacy ==
Bennett died at his home in Key West, Florida on August 13, 2003.

Works by Bennett reside in the collections of the Cooper-Hewitt, National Design Museum, the Brooklyn Museum, and the Museum of Modern Art. An oral history with Bennett is held by the Archives of American Art.
