= Olcott Hotel =

Hotel in Manhattan, New York

Coordinates: 40.77700°N 73.97763°W

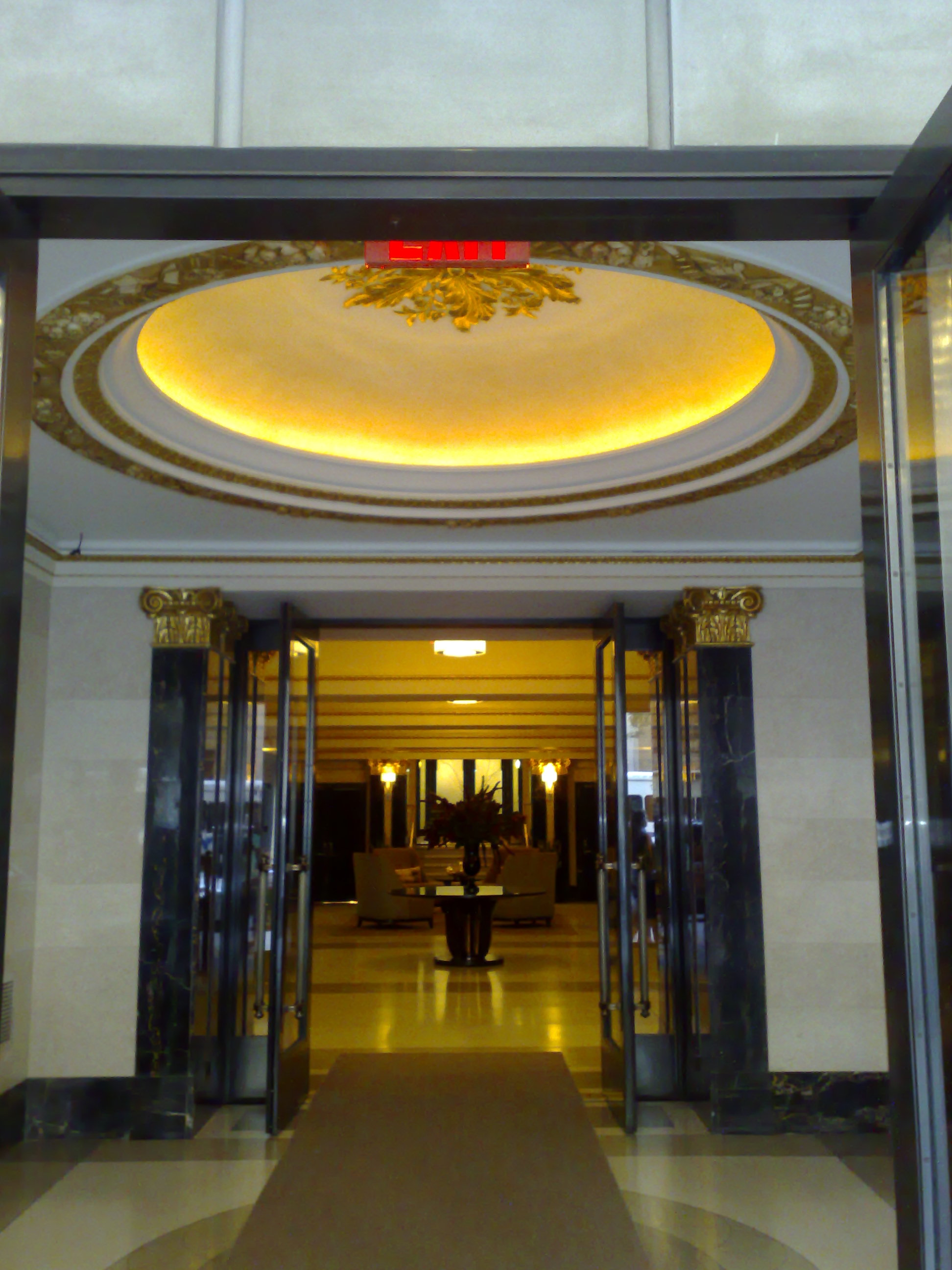
The Olcott Hotel's front entrance and lobby.

The Olcott Hotel is on West 72nd Street in New York City's Upper West Side. It was built by the Lapidus Engineering Company beginning in late 1925. The edifice was one of a number of structures constructed at the time from Central Park West to Columbus Avenue on 72nd Street, in Manhattan. The Fairfield Hotel was another building going up concurrently. Its builder was Louis Israelson and Associates. The Olcott Hotel was sixteen stories when it was completed. It opened in 1930.

== Ownership ==
Ralph Reck, manager of the Olcott Hotel, was elected chairman of the Board of the Hotel Executive Club in January 1937. In August 1946 the hotel was sold to Atwood C. Wolfe for cash above a purchase money first mortgage of $850,000 made by the Travelers Insurance Company. Its property value was assessed at $1,250,000. Hotel Olcott, Inc., was represented by attorney Abraham J. Halprin. The property was sold to Wolfe through George W. Warneicke. The buyer was represented by Dreyer & Traub.

The Olcott Hotel was owned by a syndicate composed of E. Fishbein, S. Mendick, and M. Kaplan in 1956. In September of that year they purchased the Oliver Cromwell apartment-hotel, which was located at 12 West Seventy-Second Street near Central Park West. The syndicate leased the Oliver Cromwell, a twenty-nine story edifice, from the Olicrom Operating Corporation, who represented Herbert Riesner. The deal was brokered by Des Gabor, vice-president of M. Morgenthau-Seixas Company. The title was insured by the City Title Insurance Company.

Joseph Slutsky, 76, owned the Olcott Hotel along with his sons, Ben and Julius, at the time of his death in November 1958. Slutsky founded the Nevele Hotel in Ellenville, New York in 1901. The Slutskys formerly owned the Raleigh Hotel and Metropole Hotel in Miami, Florida.

Eugene Fishbein managed the Olcott Hotel in 1980. At the time he had been in charge of operations for twenty-five years. In 1980 all units in the hotel had pantries or kitchenettes. Almost two thirds of its four hundred and fifty units were rent stabilized. Long-term occupants paid $300 to $450 per month for studio apartments. One bedroom apartments cost from $400 to $600 monthly. Incoming tenants paid fifty percent more than the stabilized rates. New tenants tended to be transient, people from abroad or members of the entertainment industry. They stayed only two to three weeks on average.

In 1995 Olcott Hotel owners offered to pay $600,000 to restore the building if the New York City Planning Department agreed to legalize its twenty-nine professional suites and one hundred twenty-two transient hotel rooms. The hotel had been operating for more than thirty years without proper zoning permission. Lee Rosen, the building's general manager, wanted the building to remain exactly as it is.

== Hotel events and people ==
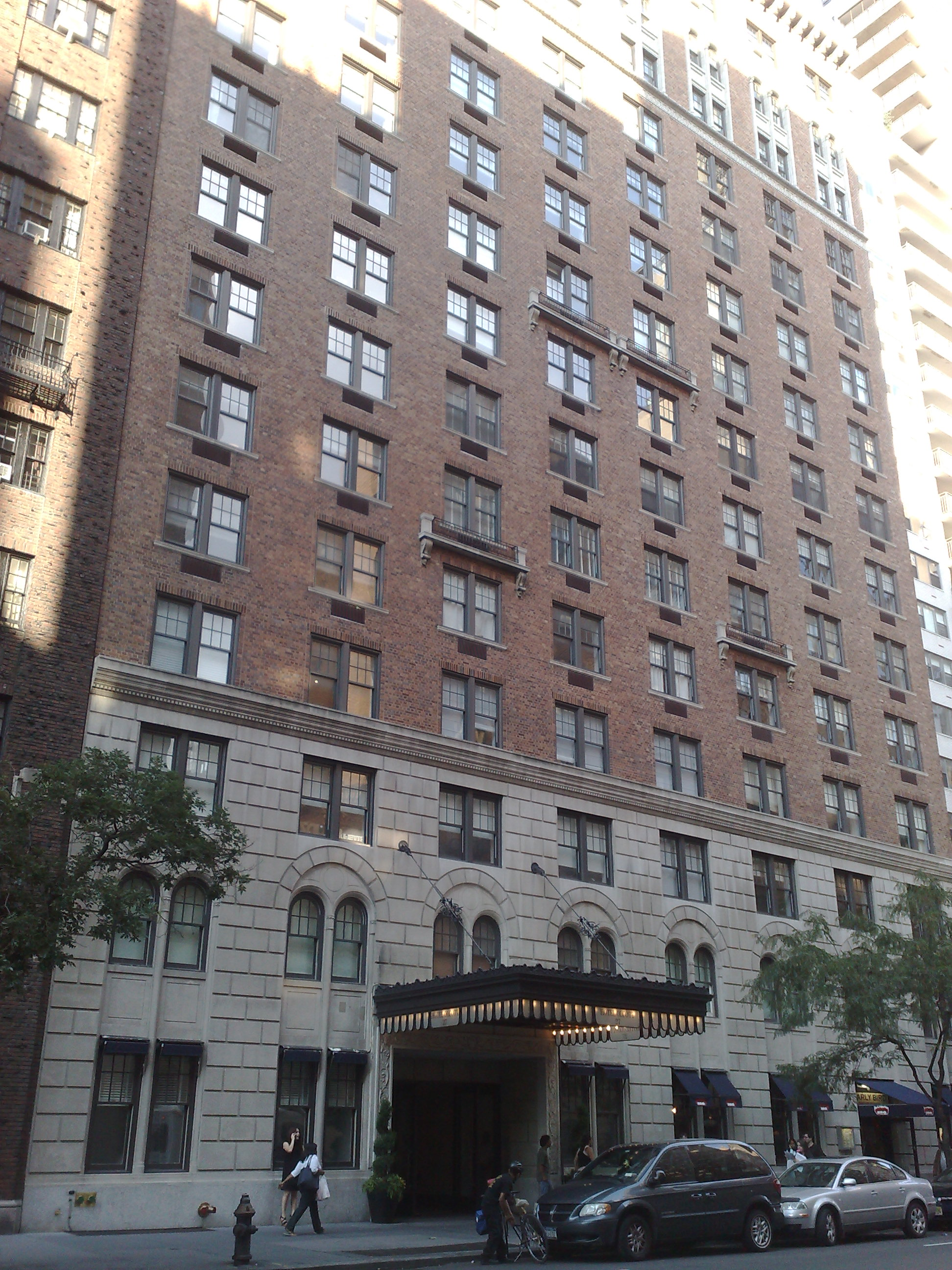
Hotel exterior

Isidore H. Bander, 66, vice-president of McKesson & Robbins, a drug company, either fell or jumped to his death from the roof of the Olcott Hotel in September 1951. His body landed on the sidewalk in front of the hotel. He had told his wife he was going for a walk but instead took an elevator to the roof.

In 1976 Jeff Bayonne purchased the Manhattan Bridge Club, a duplicate bridge club which had been on the sixteenth floor of the hotel for decades. In 1992 he acquired the Gotham, a declining contract bridge club across the hall.

In October 1980 Mark David Chapman stayed at the Waldorf Astoria, the YMCA, and the Olcott Hotel before he assassinated John Lennon.

In the mid-1980s cult icon Tiny Tim and then manager Rick Hendrix lived at the Olcott Hotel for a short period of time. The latter residence was just a block away from The Dakota apartments.

Nina Youshkevitch, a distinguished ballet dancer and teacher, maintained a dance studio in the hotel for many years, and was also a resident.

Martin Scorsese's Taxi Driver (1976) featured the hotel in a scene.
