= 101 Central Park West =

Apartment building in Manhattan, New York

Coordinates: 40.775291°N 73.97684°W

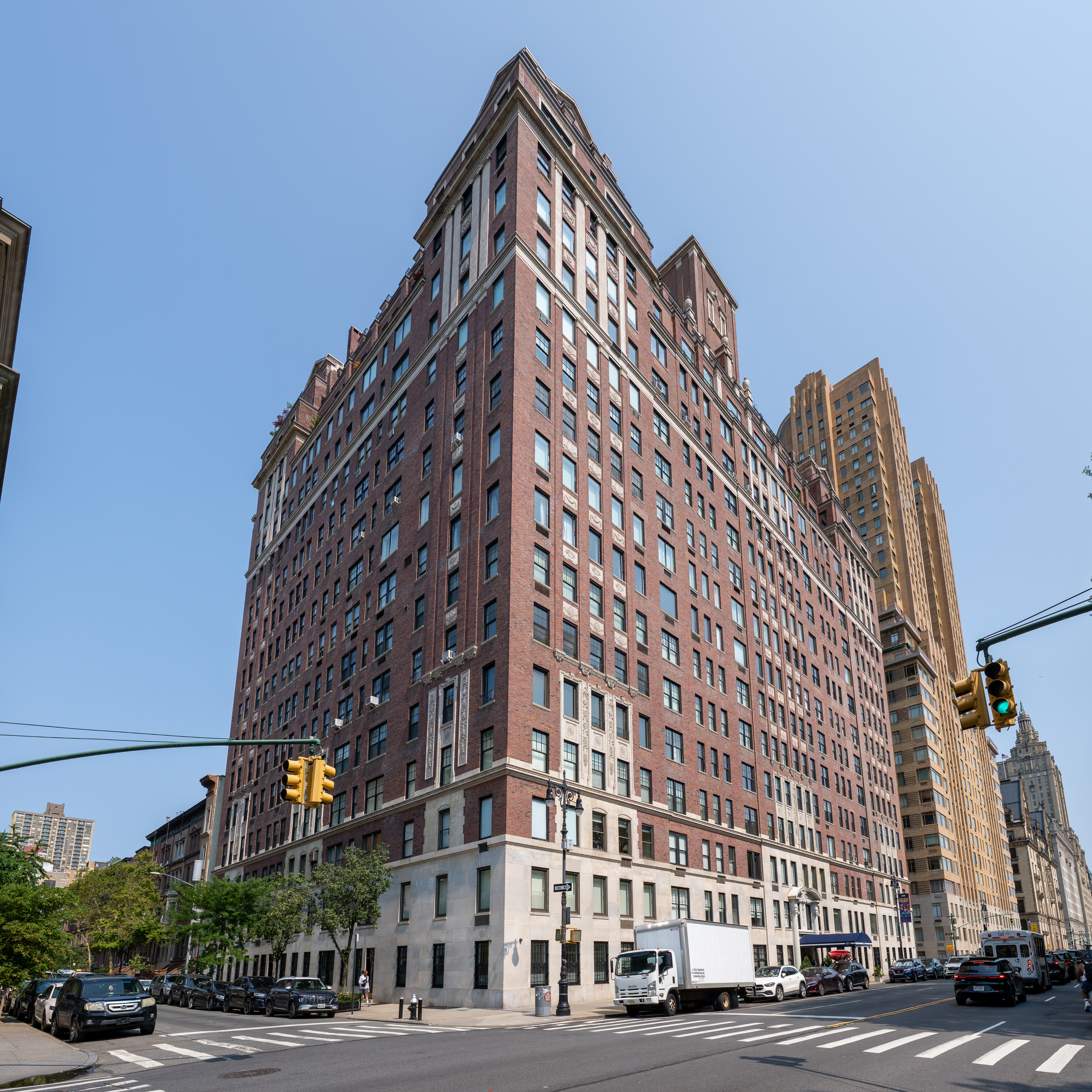
- Interactive map of the 101 Central Park West area

General information
- Status: Completed
- Location: 101 Central Park West; Manhattan, New York City 10023
- Completed: 1929

Technical details
- Floor count: 18

101 Central Park West is a residential building on Central Park West, between 70th and 71st Streets, on the Upper West Side of Manhattan in New York City.

== History ==
The apartment building was constructed in 1929 in the Neo-Renaissance style by architects Simon Schwartz & Arthur Gross. It is next to The Majestic between 71st and 72nd Streets and Congregation Shearith Israel on 70th Street. The building is divided into three blocks which all consist of two elevator banks. Past and present residents of the building include Harrison Ford, Rick Moranis, Georgina Bloomberg, Noah Emmerich, Meyer Davis, and Rabbi Norman Lamm, the former chancellor of Yeshiva University.

It was one of several buildings on Central Park West that were built for Jews who were not welcomed in Manhattan's East Side luxury buildings.

Since the building is managed as a cooperative, units can be owned by holding companies. A top-floor apartment was sold for $35 million in 2016, but then decreased in value the following years.
