= Bry (surname) =

Bry is a surname. Notable people with the surname include:

- Barbara Bry (born 1950), American entrepreneur
- Benoît Bry, French water polo player - see 2001 Men's European Water Polo Championship squads
- Dave Bry (1970–2017), American writer
- Edith Bry (1898–1991), American painter, printmaker, and glass artist
- Ellen Bry (born 1951), American actress
- Fabrice Bry (born 1972), French volleyball player
- Lynn Bry, physician, microbiologist and geneticist
- Knut Bry (born 1946), Norwegian photographer

== See also ==
- De Bry, another surname
