= De Bry =

The De Brys were a family of artisans noted for their engraving:

- Thiry de Bry (1495–1590), goldsmith in Liège
  - Theodor de Bry (1528–1598), engraver, goldsmith, editor and publisher born in Liège, son of Thiry de Bry
    - Johann Theodor de Bry (1561–1623), engraver and publisher born in Strasbourg, son of Theodor de Bry

== See also ==
- Jean-Antoine-Joseph de Bry or Jean Debry (1760–1834), President of France's National Convention in 1793
- Bry (disambiguation)
