= Bry =

Bry or BRY may refer to:

== People ==
- Bry (surname)
- Bry (singer), Irish singer-songwriter Brian O'Reilly (born 1989)
- nickname of Bryanna McCarthy (born 1991), Canadian professional soccer player
- Bry Nelson (born 1974), American baseball player
- Bryan Webb (born 1977), Canadian singer and songwriter sometimes credited as Bry Webb

== Places ==
- Bry, Nord, France, a commune
- Le Bry, a Swiss municipality which was merged into Pont-en-Ogoz in 2003

== Codes ==
- BRY, ICAO airline designator for Burundaiavia, a former helicopter airline in Kazakhstan
- BRY, IATA airport code and FAA location identifier for Samuels Field, an airport in Kentucky, United States
- BRY, National Rail station code for Barry railway station, Wales
- BRY, station code for Berry railway station, New South Wales, Australia
- BRY, Indian Railways station code for Bareilly Junction railway station, Uttar Pradesh, India

== Other uses ==
- bry (interjection)

== See also ==
- Bry-sur-Marne, France, a commune
- De Bry, a surname
- Bry(o)- in various scientific taxa, from Ancient Greek βρύον "moss"
