= MadSci Network =

American science website

The Madsci Network is a website known primarily for its Ask-A-Scientist forum where users can ask questions to a panel of volunteer scientists. Each question, submitted via a Web interface, is reviewed by a volunteer moderator. If the question is intelligible, not a homework assignment, and has not been answered previously, it may be answered directly by the moderator, or forwarded to one of hundreds of volunteer scientists and professionals. The moderators match each question to a volunteer's area of expertise. After answering the question, the volunteer sends it back to the moderators who then review the answer prior to posting it on the web site. The moderator may ask the scientist to edit the answer or provide references for information. Thereafter, the majority of questions and answers are made publicly available in the extensive archives, which date back to 1996.

The Madsci Network hosts the Edible and Inedible Experiments Archive, a unique collection of easy science demos, and a guided tour of data from the Visible Human Project.

In 2013, the Madsci Network got approximately 600,000 unique visitors and roughly 3 million page views per month. It is a non-profit ask-a-scientist site with over 700 scientists distributed globally and has been cited in academic publications, web awards, sites/portals like yahoo.com, etc. The principals are: Founder and Executive Director Lynn Bry, and Director of Research Ricky J. Sethi. Notable scientists who have answered questions on the website include Samuel Conway and Phil Plait.
