= Jean-Jacques Boissard =

French antiquary and Neo-Latin poet (1528–1602)

Jean-Jacques Boissard (1528 – 30 October 1602) was an antiquary and Neo-Latin poet.

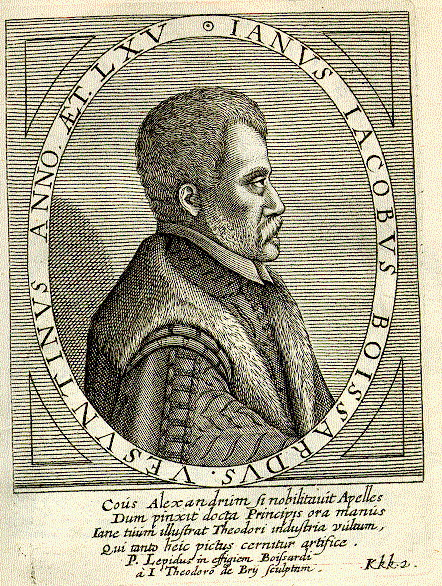
Jean-Jacques Boissard c. 1598 by Theodore de Bry

== Life ==
He was born at Besançon and educated at Leuven; but he secretly left the seminary there, and travelled through (Germany) to Italy, where he remained several years and was often reduced to poverty. His time in Italy gave him a taste for antiquities, and he formed a collection of artefacts from Rome and its vicinity. He then visited the islands of Greece, but illness obliged him to return to Rome. Here he completed his collection, and returned to France; but not being permitted to profess publicly the Protestant religion, which he had embraced some time before, he withdrew to Metz, where he remained until his death.

== Works ==
He provided text and drawings for books by Robert Boissard, Theodor de Bry, Jacques Granthomme and Alexandre Vallée. Major works are:

- Poemata (1574)
- Emblemata (1584)
- Icones Virorum Illustrium (1597)
- Vitae et Icones Sultanorum Turcicorum, etc. (1597)
- Theatrum Vitae Humanae (1596)
- Romanae urbis topographia et antiquitates (1597–1602)
- De Divinatione et Magicis Praestigiis (1605)
- Habitus Variarum Orbis Gentium (1581), ornamented with seventy illuminated figures.
