= Ricky J. Sethi =

- Education: University of California, Riverside; University of Southern California; University of California, Berkeley
- Scientific career
- Workplaces: USC Information Sciences Institute; University of California, Los Angeles; University of California, Riverside

Ricky J. Sethi is an American computer scientist and full Professor of Computer Science at Fitchburg State University and the Director of Research for The Madsci Network.

His research spans several areas in artificial intelligence, machine learning, social computing, and computer vision. His work has made contributions to the fields of misinformation detection, virtual communities, and the application of computational methods to digital humanities and art analysis.

He was appointed as a National Science Foundation (NSF) Computing Innovation Fellow by the Computing Community Consortium and the Computing Research Association. He has contributed significantly in the fields of machine learning, computer vision, social computing, and science education/eLearning.

== Education ==
Sethi received his B.S. in physics and neurobiology from the University of California, Berkeley, his M.S. in physics/information systems from the University of Southern California, and his Ph.D. in artificial intelligence from the University of California, Riverside. He was a postdoc at the University of California, Riverside and was later appointed a Computing Innovation Fellow at UCLA/USC Information Sciences Institute.

== Career ==
Prior to joining Fitchburg State University (FSU), he served as a Research Scientist at the University of Massachusetts Amherst (UMass Amherst) and the UMass Medical School, as well as at the University of California, Los Angeles (UCLA) and the University of Southern California (USC) Information Sciences Institute. During his tenure at UCLA/USC, he was selected as a National Science Foundation (NSF) Computing Innovation Fellow (CIFellow) by the Computing Research Association (CRA) and the Computing Community Consortium (CCC).

He has authored or co-authored more than 50 peer-reviewed papers and book chapters and made numerous presentations on his research. He has taught various courses in computer science, physics, and general science. He was also the Lead Integration Scientist for the WASA project, supported by the NSF and ONR, as well as part of the UCR DARPA VIRAT program. He was the Local Organizing Chair for the ACM International Conference on Intelligent User Interfaces, a member of IEEE, and the Associate Editor-in-Chief for the Journal of Postdoctoral Research. His work has been featured on The Huffington Post, The Conversation, and The Sentinel. He was also spotlighted as an Indian-American Computer Scientist by NRI Today.

Sethi has received numerous grants and awards for his research, including funding from the National Science Foundation (NSF), National Endowment for the Humanities (NEH), and Amazon.

He is an associate editor for Frontiers in Artificial Intelligence and has served on the editorial boards of several other journals.

== Research ==
Sethi has developed innovative frameworks for fact-checking misinformation where his work emphasizes the role of emotional pedagogical agents and social collaboration in mitigating the spread of fake news and alternative facts. His research has addressed misinformation through the development of social argumentation frameworks and collaborative fact-checking systems for virtual communities. Sethi has also written a textbook, "Essential Computational Thinking: Computer Science from Scratch", that builds a unique perspective on developing computer science from first principles based on Shannon's Information Theory.

Sethi's research has focused on computer vision, scientific workflows, and computational approaches to analyzing social phenomena. His early work contributed to the development of physics-based and stochastic methods for analyzing human activities in video, introducing frameworks for understanding group behaviors and crowd dynamics.

This research led to significant contributions in activity recognition through the Human Action Image concept and the Atomic Group Actions Dataset.

His research into visual stylometry led to contributions at the intersection of art and technology, particularly through computational techniques for analyzing artistic style. He developed WAIVS (Workflows for the Analysis of Images in Visual Stylometry), a tool funded by the National Endowment for the Humanities, which introduced novel computational methods for analyzing artistic style.

His textbook Essential Computational Thinking: Computer Science from Scratch has been incorporated into the curricula of several universities and educational programs. Sethi’s research has been published in leading computer science venues, including ACM Multimedia, IEEE International Conference on Image Processing, and Pattern Recognition Letters, among others.

Sethi also has contributed to the nascent field of Artificial Metacognition in Large Language Models and developed a framework for monitoring and control in LLM ensembles. His work has been featured on The Conversation and various venues like Fast Company, Live Science, and Seattle Post-Intelligencer.

== Selected publications ==
- Ricky J. Sethi, Hefei Qiu, Charles Courchaine, and Joshua Iacoboni, "Do LLMs Dream of Electric Emotions? Towards Quantifying Metacognition and Generalizing the Teacher-Student Model Using Ensembles of LLMs". ACM International Conference on Information and Knowledge Management (CIKM) (2025)
- Charles Courchaine, Tasnova Tabassum, Corey Wade, and Ricky J. Sethi, "Explainable e-Discovery (XeD) Using an Interpretable Fuzzy ARTMAP Neural Network for Technology-Assisted Review". IEEE International Conference on Big Data (BIG DATA) (2023)
- Charles Courchaine and Ricky J. Sethi, "Fuzzy Law: Towards Creating a Novel Explainable Technology-Assisted Review System for e-Discovery". IEEE International Conference on Big Data (BIG DATA) (2022).
- Sethi, Ricky J. (2017-07-04). "Crowdsourcing the Verification of Fake News and Alternative Facts". Proceedings of the 28th ACM Conference on Hypertext and Social Media. HT '17. New York, NY, USA: Association for Computing Machinery. pp. 315–316. doi:10.1145/3078714.3078746. ISBN 978-1-4503-4708-2.
- Ricky J. Sethi and Yolanda Gil, "Scientific Workflows in Data Analysis: Bridging Expertise Across Multiple Domains". Future Generation Computer Systems (FGCS) (2017)
- Veaux, Richard D. De; Agarwal, Mahesh; Averett, Maia; Baumer, Benjamin S.; Bray, Andrew; Bressoud, Thomas C.; Bryant, Lance; Cheng, Lei Z.; Francis, Amanda; Gould, Robert; Kim, Albert Y.; Kretchmar, Matt; Lu, Qin; Moskol, Ann; Nolan, Deborah; Pelayo, Roberto; Raleigh, Sean; Sethi, Ricky J.; Sondjaja, Mutiara; Tiruviluamala, Neelesh; Uhlig, Paul X.; Washington, Talitha M.; Wesley, Curtis L.; White, David; Ye, Ping (7 March 2017). "Curriculum Guidelines for Undergraduate Programs in Data Science". Annual Review of Statistics and Its Application. 4 (1): 15–30. arXiv:1801.06814. Bibcode:2017AnRSA...4...15D. doi:10.1146/annurev-statistics-060116-053930.
- Ricky J. Sethi and Yolanda Gil, "Reproducibility in computer vision: Towards open publication of image analysis experiments as semantic workflows". IEEE International Conference on eScience (eScience) (2016)
- Ricky J. Sethi, "Towards Defining Groups and Crowds in Video Using the Atomic Group Actions Dataset". IEEE International Conference on Image Processing (ICIP) (2015)
- Balaji Polepalli Ramesh, Ricky J. Sethi, and Hong Yu, "Figure-Associated Text Summarization and Evaluation". PLOS ONE (2014)
- Ricky J. Sethi, Yolanda Gil, Hyunjoon Jo, and Andrew Philpot, "Large-Scale Multimedia Content Analysis Using Scientific Workflows". ACM International Conference on Multimedia (ACM MM) (2013)
- Ricky J. Sethi and Lynn Bry, "The Madsci Network: Direct Communication of Science from Scientist to Layperson". 21st International Conference on Computers in Education (ICCE) (2013)
- Ayelet Baram‐Tsabari, Ricky J. Sethi, Lynn Bry, Anat Yarden, Asking scientists: a decade of questions analyzed by age, gender, and country, Science Education 93 (1), 131-160 (2009)
- Ricky J. Sethi, Amit K. Roy-Chowdhury, Activity recognition by integrating the physics of motion with a neuromorphic model of perception, Motion and Video Computing (2009)
- Ayelet Baram‐Tsabari, Ricky J. Sethi, Lynn Bry, Anat Yarden, Using questions sent to an Ask‐A‐Scientist site to identify children's interests in science, Science Education 90 (6), 1050-1072 (2006)
