= The Beresford =

Residential skyscraper in Manhattan, New York

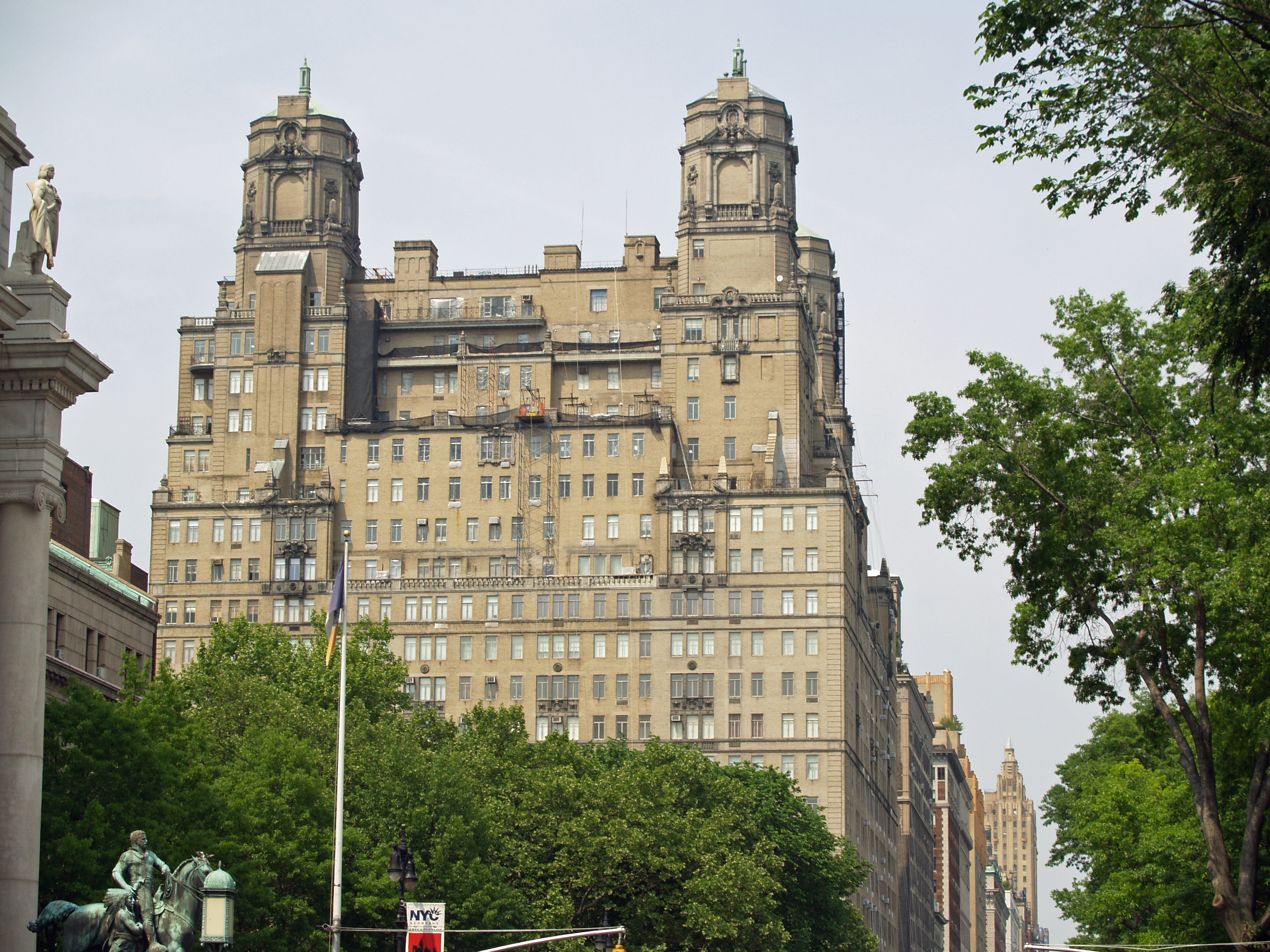
- View from the south

General information
- Type: Housing cooperative
- Architectural style: Renaissance Revival
- Location: 211 Central Park West, Manhattan, New York, United States
- Coordinates: 40°46′57″N 73°58′19″W
- Construction started: 1928
- Completed: September 13, 1929

Technical details
- Structural system: Steel superstructure
- Floor count: 22
- Lifts/elevators: 11

Design and construction
- Architect: Emery Roth

New York City Landmark
- Designated: September 15, 1987
- Reference no.: 1520

U.S. Historic district – Contributing property
- Designated: November 9, 1982
- Reference no.: 82001189

The Beresford is a cooperative apartment building at 211 Central Park West, between 81st and 82nd Streets, on the Upper West Side of Manhattan in New York City, United States. It was constructed in 1929 and was designed by architect Emery Roth. The Beresford is 22 stories tall and is topped by octagonal towers on its northeast, southwest, and southeast corners. The building is a contributing property to the Central Park West Historic District, a National Register of Historic Places–listed district, and is a New York City designated landmark.

The building surrounds an internal courtyard to the west. The facade has two primary elevations, facing east toward Central Park and south toward the American Museum of Natural History. There are numerous setbacks on each elevation, which double as terraces. The first three stories are clad in rusticated blocks of limestone, with three main entrances at ground level. The remainder of the facade is made of light brick with terracotta ornamentation. Each of the towers is decorated with arches and finials and contains one penthouse apartment. The building has three terrazzo and marble lobbies with molded plaster ceilings. On the upper stories, many apartments are split across two levels and contain large rooms. There were originally 178 apartments, each with four to sixteen rooms, but several apartments have been split or combined over the years.

The Beresford replaced an 11-story apartment building with the same name, built in 1889 and 1892. The current apartment complex was built after a previous attempt to redevelop the site in the 1920s had failed. The building opened in September 1929 but soon went into receivership following the collapse of the Bank of United States, which held the mortgage. The Beresford was acquired in 1940 by an investment syndicate, which owned the building for the next two decades. The building was then converted to a housing cooperative in 1962. Over the years, its residents have included directors, actors, journalists, and executives.

== Site ==
The Beresford is at 211 Central Park West on the Upper West Side neighborhood of Manhattan in New York City, United States. The building occupies the western sidewalk of Central Park West (formerly Eighth Avenue) between 81st Street to the south and 82nd Street to the north. The Beresford is situated on an approximately square land lot with an area of 40,350 square feet (3,749 m^{2}). The land lot has a frontage of 204.33 feet (62.28 m) along Central Park West and 200 feet (61 m) on both of the side streets. The American Museum of Natural History (AMNH) is immediately across 81st Street to the south. The Diana Ross Playground and the Great Lawn and Turtle Pond are directly to the east, inside Central Park. An entrance to the New York City Subway's 81st Street–Museum of Natural History station is directly outside the southeast corner of the building.

The Beresford is one of several apartment buildings on Central Park West that are primarily identified by an official name. Even though a street address was sufficient to identify these apartment buildings, this trend followed a British practice of giving names to buildings without addresses. By contrast, buildings on Fifth Avenue, along the eastern side of Central Park, are mainly known by their addresses. Christopher Gray of The New York Times described the Beresford as one of several apartment buildings in Manhattan that were named after 1920; according to Gray, such structures usually "were either truly grand or had hotel-like features". The Beresford's name is derived directly from a previous building on the site.

=== Previous structure ===
The construction of Central Park in the 1860s spurred construction on the Upper East Side of Manhattan, but similar development on the Upper West Side was slower to come. Major developments on the West Side were erected after the Ninth Avenue elevated line opened in 1879, providing direct access to Lower Manhattan. The first large apartment building in the area was the Dakota, which opened in 1884. The city installed power lines on Central Park West at the end of the 19th century, thus allowing the construction of multi-story apartment hotels with elevators.

Among the early apartment hotels was the original Hotel Beresford at 81st Street and Eighth Avenue. The structure was built by Alva Walker in two phases. Theodore E. Thomson designed the first section in 1889, a six-story building with 34 apartments. The initial structure also had a dining room on the top floor; wide hallways to each suite; and elevators. In 1892, Walker built a ten-story annex and moved the dining room to the top of that building. This addition had 64 apartments.

== Architecture ==
The present Beresford was designed by Emery Roth. It is one of five Roth apartment blocks on Central Park West; the others are the El Dorado, the San Remo, the Alden, and the Ardsley. The Beresford was built by HRH Construction. Unlike other large buildings on Central Park West, which were typically attributed to a single developer, no one took credit for developing the Beresford specifically. The syndicate that developed the Beresford had also erected the San Remo, seven blocks south, shortly after the Beresford was completed.

=== Form and facade ===
The building contains 22 stories, which surround an interior courtyard to the west, creating a U-shaped plan. There are setbacks at the 14th, 16th, 18th, and 20th stories, which were included to comply with the 1916 Zoning Resolution. These setbacks are enclosed by iron railings and stone balustrades, creating private terraces for each tenant. When the building opened, its leasing agent described the terraces as being multicolored. Above the 20th story are small octagonal towers. The northwest corner was subjected to more stringent zoning laws, so the westernmost section contains setbacks beginning at the 9th story. When the building opened, there was high demand for apartments with large terraces, particularly before air conditioning became popular.

The lowest three stories of the facade are made of rusticated blocks of limestone, while the rest of the building is clad with beige brick. The facade's primary elevations face south toward 81st Street and east toward Central Park West. This design was intended to take advantage of the building's placement next to the AMNH and Central Park. The north elevation on 82nd Street is simpler in design than the primary elevations, while the west elevation is not decorated. The north, south, and east elevations contain terracotta ornamentation such as pilasters, broken pediments, balustrades, obelisks, and cartouches. There are also motifs such as angels, dolphins, and rams' heads. The corners of each elevation are articulated by vertical bands of brick quoins. There are horizontal band courses above the 9th, 12th, and 13th stories; each band course consists of two molded terracotta bands.

All three elevations are divided vertically into multiple bays, each containing one window per floor. Most of the building's windows are of a single design: two movable casements topped by a stationary transom. The south elevation is divided into 30 bays from east to west. They are arranged into groups of three, except for bays 1–4 and 29–30, (Note: In this article, the bays of the eastern (Central Park West) elevation are counted from south to north. The bays of the northern (82nd Street) and southern (81st Street) elevations are counted from east to west.) which are paired. Bays 1–7 and 23–30 are "pavilions", which set back at the 16th story, while the center bays set back at the 14th, 18th, and 20th stories. The east elevation contains 29 bays from south to north, arranged in a 3-3-5-3-3-5-3-4 pattern. Bays 1–6 and 23–29 are "pavilions" with 16th-story setbacks, while the center bays set back at the 14th, 18th, and 20th stories. The north elevation is also divided into 29 bays, which are all arranged into groups of three, except for the westernmost pair of bays.

==== Entrances ====
There are four entrances at the base: two on 81st Street and one each on Central Park West and 82nd Street. The main entrances are at 1 and 7 West 81st Street and 211 Central Park West; each leads to its own lobby. The entrance at 1 West 81st Street is within bays 5–7, while the entrance at 7 West 81st Street is within bays 23–25. The sidewalks in front of both doorways are covered by canopies, and there are planted areas on either side of each doorway. Both doorways contain a set of bronze-and-glass double doors, and there are bronze-and-glass lanterns on either side of each set of doors. Each of the doorways is surrounded by a limestone frame with pilasters on either side, which contain panels with reliefs of acanthus leaves. The entrances on 81st Street are topped by curved broken pediments, each with a central cartouche and a keystone. On the second story above each of the 81st Street entrances is a group of three windows. The central window of each group is placed within a frame and contains the head of a winged cherub on its lintel.

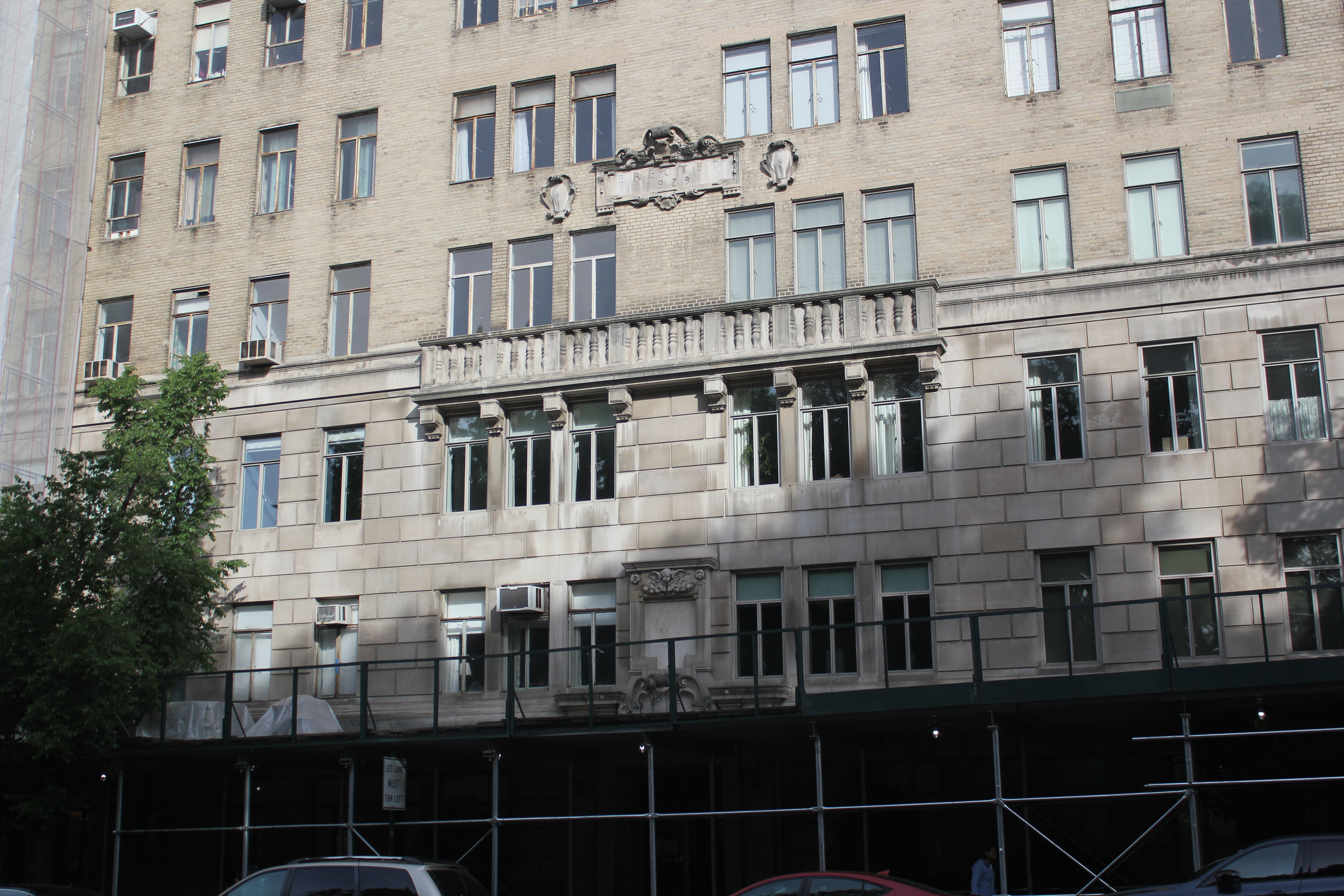
The entrance on Central Park West, seen here with scaffolding above it

The Central Park West entrance is slightly off-center, spanning bays 14–15. It has a canopy, planted areas, bronze-and-glass double doors, and lanterns similar to those on 81st Street. The relief panels at this entrance also depict acanthus leaves, but the tops of these relief panels also contain motifs of winged angels playing horns. Above the Central Park West entrance is a broken lintel, which flanks a cartouche with festoons. On the second story is a window with a winged cherub's head on its lintel.

The 82nd Street entrance is simpler in design compared with the three other entrances, occupying bay 23. This entrance lacks a canopy and contains a bronze-and-glass single door. There are lanterns on either side of the doorway, as well as a cartouche atop the door frame. Above the door frame is a metal grille, which is flanked by garlands and scrolls and is topped by the head of a winged cherub.

There are also nine entrances to individual offices on the ground floor: two on Central Park West, three on 81st Street, and four on 82nd Street. Each doorway contains a single door, recessed within the rusticated limestone facade. The bronze-and-glass office doors are simple in design and are topped by a bronze-and-glass transom panel. On the far western end of the 81st and 82nd Street frontages, there is a short standalone wall of rusticated blocks, which contains a round archway topped by a keystone with a winged cherub's head. There is a metal service gate below each archway. The 81st Street gate contains a panel with the word "Service", and the panel above the gate is decorated with guttae.

==== Upper stories ====
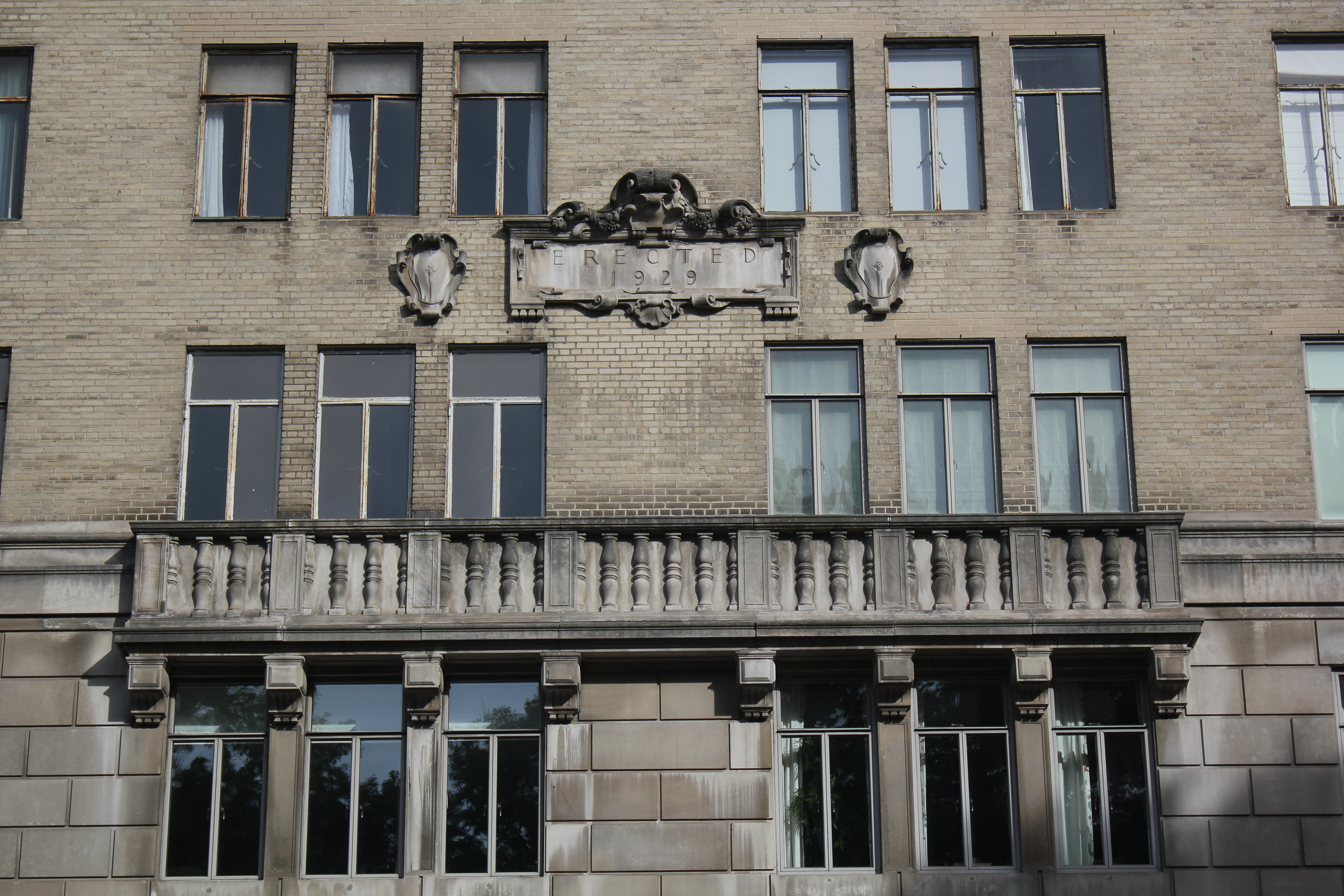
Detail of cartouche and "Erected 1929" plaque

At the fourth story on Central Park West, bays 12–17 contain a limestone balcony, which projects from the facade and is supported by eight modillions. Above the fourth story, there are four cartouches on the eastern elevation, four on the southern elevation, and two on the northern elevation. Between the two inner cartouches to the east is a plaque with the inscription "Erected 1929", which is framed by swags and scrolls.

At the 10th and 11th stories, each elevation contains several double-height window groupings, each three bays wide and surrounded by terracotta frames. In each grouping, the 10th-story windows contain false balustrades, while the spandrel panels between the 10th and 11th stories contain a cartouche, winged cherubs, and brackets. In the center bay of each grouping, there is a rosette above the 11th story. At the 14th and 15th stories, there are more double-height window groupings, each three bays wide. Each grouping is flanked by brick pilasters and is topped by a triangular broken pediment surrounding a central grille. There are rosettes on the spandrels between the 14th and 15th stories. The center bay of each grouping contains a projecting balcony at the 14th story; a curved broken pediment with a ram's head above the 14th story; and a cartouche above the 15th story.

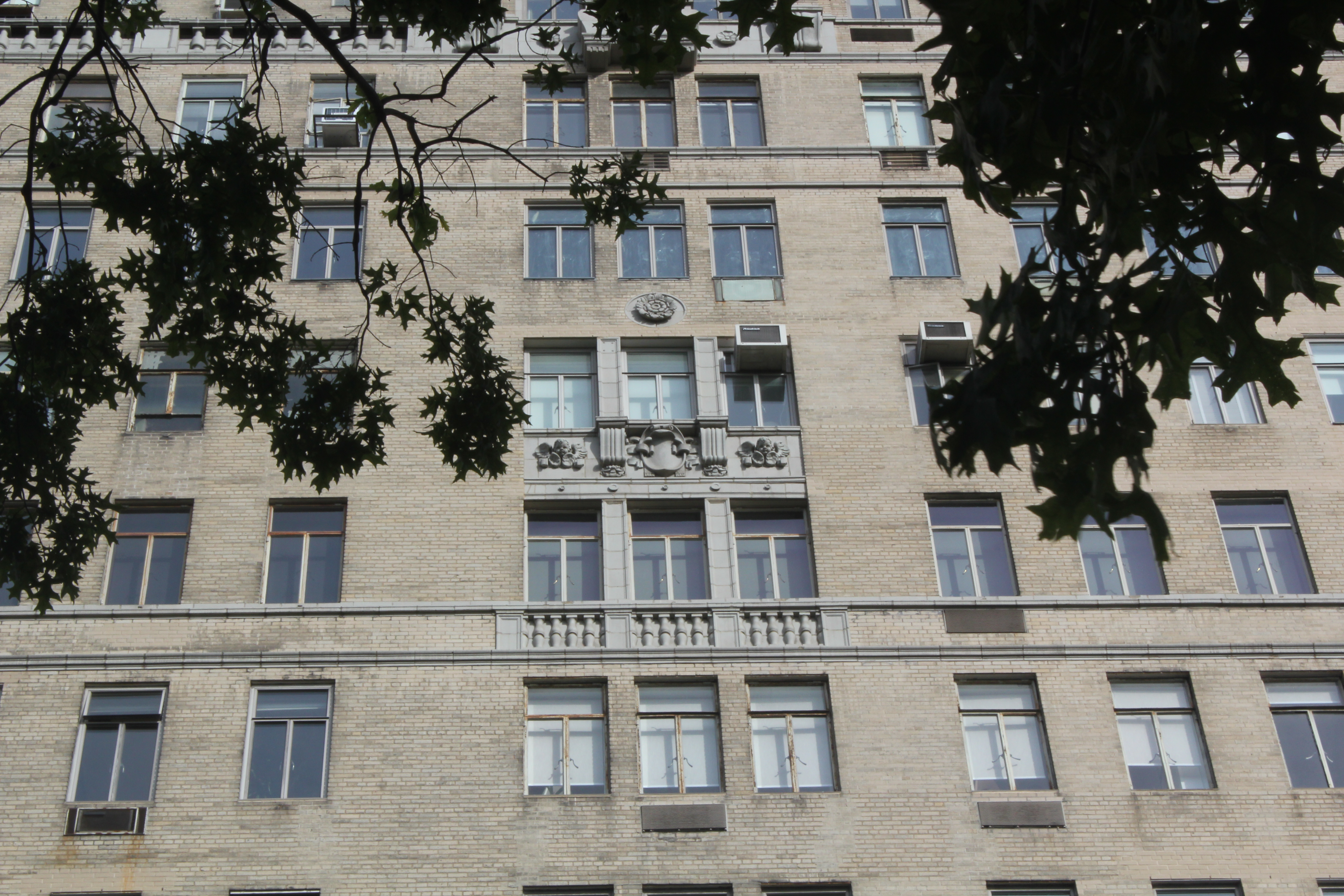
10th- and 11th-story window frames

In front of the 14th-story setback, there are balustrades on the northern, eastern, and southern elevations. The balustrade of the eastern elevation occupies bays 7–22. There is a cartouche at the center of the eastern balustrade, decorated with half-cherubs, scrolls, and cherub heads. The balustrade on the southern elevation takes up bays 8–22, while that on the northern elevation takes up bays 7–18; there are no cartouches on these balustrades. On the 17th story of the eastern elevation, there is a cartouche between bays 14 and 15, decorated with scrolls and ribbons. It is aligned with both the entrance below and the chimneys above. Above the 17th story, there are chimneys at the centers of the northern, southern, and eastern elevations. Another chimney is located at the western end of the southern elevation.

The outer "pavilions" on the eastern elevation are five bays wide at each of the 16th to 19th stories and three bays wide at the 20th story. At the 19th story of each pavilion, the center window is flanked by pilasters. Directly above are brackets and pilasters, which flank the center window of each pavilion at the 20th story. Above these pilasters is a curved broken pediment, inside which is a rounded dormer opening with a grille. At the 20th story, each corner contains urn-shaped finials just outside the penthouses.

==== Towers ====
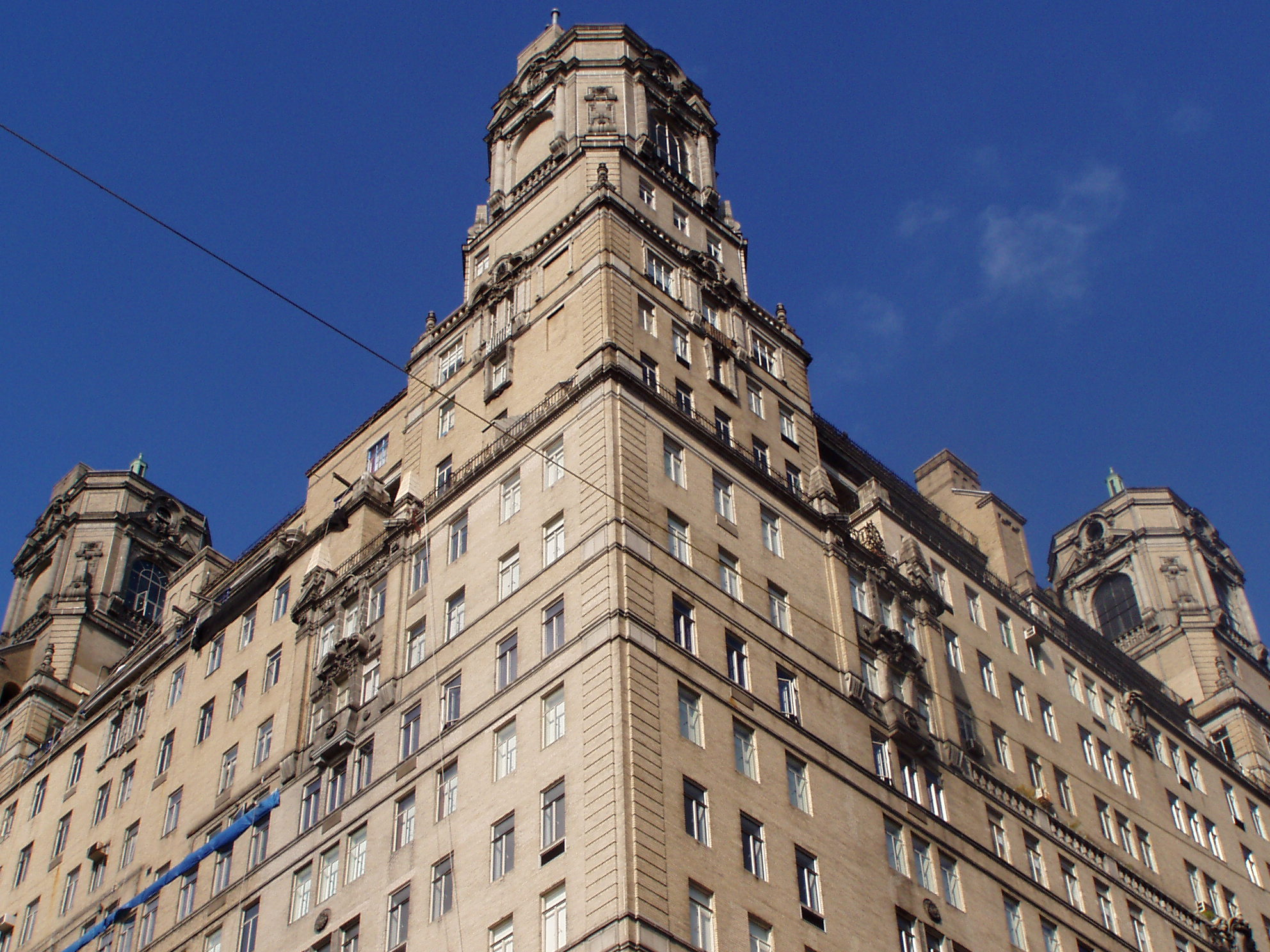
View of the southeast tower

The Beresford has three octagonal (Note: Ruttenbaum 1986, p. 128 erroneously describes the towers as being hexagonal.) towers above the northeast, southwest, and southeast corners of the 20th story. Each tower has four wider faces, which are parallel to Manhattan's street grid, as well as four narrower faces, which are diagonal to the street grid. There are balustrades, flanked by console brackets, on the wider faces of each tower. There are large arched windows above the balustrades. The arches were originally open-air openings but were fitted with windows in the 1950s. Above each console bracket, engaged columns support a triangular broken pediment with an oval bull's-eye opening at the center. Above the oval openings are winged cherubs' heads. There are also decorations of half-cherubs flanking rams' heads and urns, as well as swags that hang from rosettes.

On the narrower faces of each tower are finials. These are supported by console brackets, which are placed beneath the level of the arched windows on the wider faces. Each narrow face contains a rectangular blind opening. Above each of these openings are triangular broken pediments, followed by panels with winged cherubs' heads. Above the towers are pyramidal roofs with copper and glass lanterns.

=== Features ===
Each of the entrances on 81st Street and Central Park West leads to its own lobby; as a result, the Beresford is divided functionally into three sections, and staff must go outdoors to travel between each section. Because each lobby has its own elevators and stairs, there were fewer public hallways on the upper stories. This gave residents a feeling of privacy, since tenants were largely separated both from each other and from servants.

There were eleven elevators in total, including five residential elevators. Each elevator served at most two apartments on each floor. The elevators stopped at a small foyer on each floor, providing access to the two apartments. In some cases, an elevator served only one apartment on a floor, so the elevator doors opened directly into that tenant's foyer. In addition to the residential elevators, each apartment was also accessed by a service elevator and foyer.

==== Lobbies ====
Roth intended for the decorations of the lobbies to reflect the building's luxury character, leading one publication to describe the lobbies as "marble halls of your dizziest dreams". The floors of each lobby are composed of gray and beige terrazzo tiles. The terrazzo tiles are surrounded by a multicolored band of mosaic tiles laid in a chevron pattern, as well as a dark marble border. The lobby also contains freestanding brass pedestals with lighting sconces; the pedestals are decorated with cherubs and foliate decorations.

The lower sections of the lobbies' walls contain baseboards of oxblood and green marble; the baseboards are molded at the top. The remainders of the lobbies' walls are beige and contain projecting marble pilasters. The capitals of each pilaster are decorated with varying motifs, including garlands interspersed with classical volutes, as well as cherubs' heads. By the 1980s, the walls had been painted yellow. Though The New York Times described the walls as being clad with plaster, the building's managing agents said the walls were still made of marble and that the yellow color came from a coating. There are "art glass" windows on the walls, overlooking the courtyard. The walls contain doorways leading from the lobbies to various rooms. The lintels of these doorways contain gilded plaster cartouches, which depict the actions of arrival and departure.

The ceilings of each lobby are 12 feet (3.7 m) high and contain flat, vaulted, coffered, and sloped surfaces. The ceilings are plaster bas-reliefs of friezes, foliate decoration, cherubs, and mythological figures. The ceiling originally had a polychrome color scheme, which was painted white in subsequent years. Hanging from the ceilings are crystal-and-brass chandeliers. The elevator doors in the lobbies each contain floral decorations on their borders, as well as a central coat of arms that depicts a bear. The bottom of each coat of arms contains the Latin motto "Fronta Nulla Fides" (place no trust in appearances), and there is a dragon atop each coat of arms.

==== Apartments ====
As of 2022, according to the New York City Department of City Planning, the Beresford has 183 apartments. When the Beresford opened, it had 178 apartments. The specifications of each apartment were modified to accommodate individual tenants, but each story generally had ten apartments. Units ranged from four to sixteen rooms, but most units had eight to ten rooms. Many of the apartments were duplex units that originally spanned multiple stories. These duplexes were as large as many row houses and were arranged similarly to traditional row houses. In the duplexes, "public" rooms such as the living room and kitchen were on the lower level, while "private" rooms were on the upper level. When the building was sold in 1959, the Beresford was reported as having 182 apartments of three-and-a-half to twelve rooms each.

In each apartment, the elevator foyers lead to a central gallery. Duplex units contain curved iron-and-brass staircases, leading to bedrooms on the upper level. In single-story units, the gallery leads directly to the living and dining rooms. There are also long hallways leading to bedrooms and the kitchen. Butlers' pantries and maids' rooms also lead off each kitchen. Rooms generally had large dimensions, (Note: According to Ruttenbaum 1986, p. 131, the maximum room dimensions were as follows: Entrance galleries: 11 by 29 feet (3.4 by 8.8 m); Living rooms: 20 by 36 feet (6.1 by 11.0 m); Dining rooms: 16 by 28 feet (4.9 by 8.5 m); Libraries: 15 by 20 feet (4.6 by 6.1 m); Bedrooms: 18 by 28 feet (5.5 by 8.5 m); The smallest entrance gallery was 13 by 14 feet (4.0 by 4.3 m) and the smallest bedroom was 14 by 21 feet (4.3 by 6.4 m).) particularly in comparison to apartments built after World War II. Some units also contained dedicated "breakfast rooms", which were distinct from the dining rooms. The units behind each setback also contained "sun rooms", which open out onto the terraces. There were multiple large closets in each apartment, as well as large walk-in closets paneled in cedar. Each bedroom had its own bathroom, and the master bedroom of each unit also adjoined a dressing room.

The tops of all three towers were intended to be triple-story penthouse apartments. The southeast-corner tower contains unit 22D, a four-story apartment with one bedroom, two terraces, a library, and two maids' rooms. The southwest tower apartment has a similar layout with three bedrooms, a kitchen, and a library. All three towers were designed with observation rooms. The top of the southeast corner had a 16,000-U.S.-gallon (61,000 L) water tower, and the northeast corner had a smaller 3,500-U.S.-gallon (13,000 L) water tower. Mike Nichols (and later David and Helen Gurley Brown) lived in the southeast tower, while John McEnroe lived within the northeast tower. The author Steven Ruttenbaum described the southeast-corner apartment as "one of the most desirable apartments in the Beresford", even more so than the other two towers.

All of the ceilings are finished in plaster; in contrast to other buildings, the structural beams were hidden above the ceilings. Some ceilings have molded plaster reliefs, although even the simplest ceilings had molded, three-tiered plaster cornices. Ceilings on the second to 16th stories were generally 10 feet (3.0 m) high, while ceilings on the top floors were generally 12 feet (3.7 m) high. One observer said the high ceilings and the decorations constituted "the final touch of grace". There are wood-burning fireplaces in the living rooms; these contain ornate cast-stone fireplace mantels decorated in the neo-Gothic style. Each bathroom was covered in ceramic tiles and contained glass doors and multiple showerheads, a novelty at the time of the Beresford's construction. Some units were redecorated for specific tenants; for example, Ely Jacques Kahn designed an Art Deco-style apartment for artist Edith Bry when the building was completed.

== History ==
By the late 1920s, high-rise apartment buildings were being developed on Central Park West in anticipation of the completion of the New York City Subway's Eighth Avenue Line, which opened in 1932. Central Park West was concurrently widened from 48 to 63 feet (15 to 19 m). Under the Multiple Dwelling Act of 1929, (Note: Under this legislation, the "street walls" of apartment buildings could rise one and a half times the width of the adjacent street before they had to set back. On lots of more than 25,000 square feet (2,300 m^{2}), the street walls could rise three times the width of the adjacent street. Apartment buildings could rise up to 19 stories; additional stories were allowed on large plots, but the floor areas of these stories were limited to 20 percent of the lot area. These upper stories were allowed on plots of at least 30,000 square feet (2,800 m^{2}) and were required to be set back 70 feet (21 m) on all sides.) this allowed the construction of proportionally taller buildings on the avenue. The Beresford, with its three relatively short towers, had been designed just before the passage of the act. It contrasted with the multi-story twin towers of the Century, the Majestic, the San Remo, and the El Dorado, which were all built one to two years after the Beresford was completed. As Christopher Gray of The New York Times wrote: "Had the Beresford been designed a year later, its three towers would have sprouted up like Jack's beanstalk."

=== Development ===
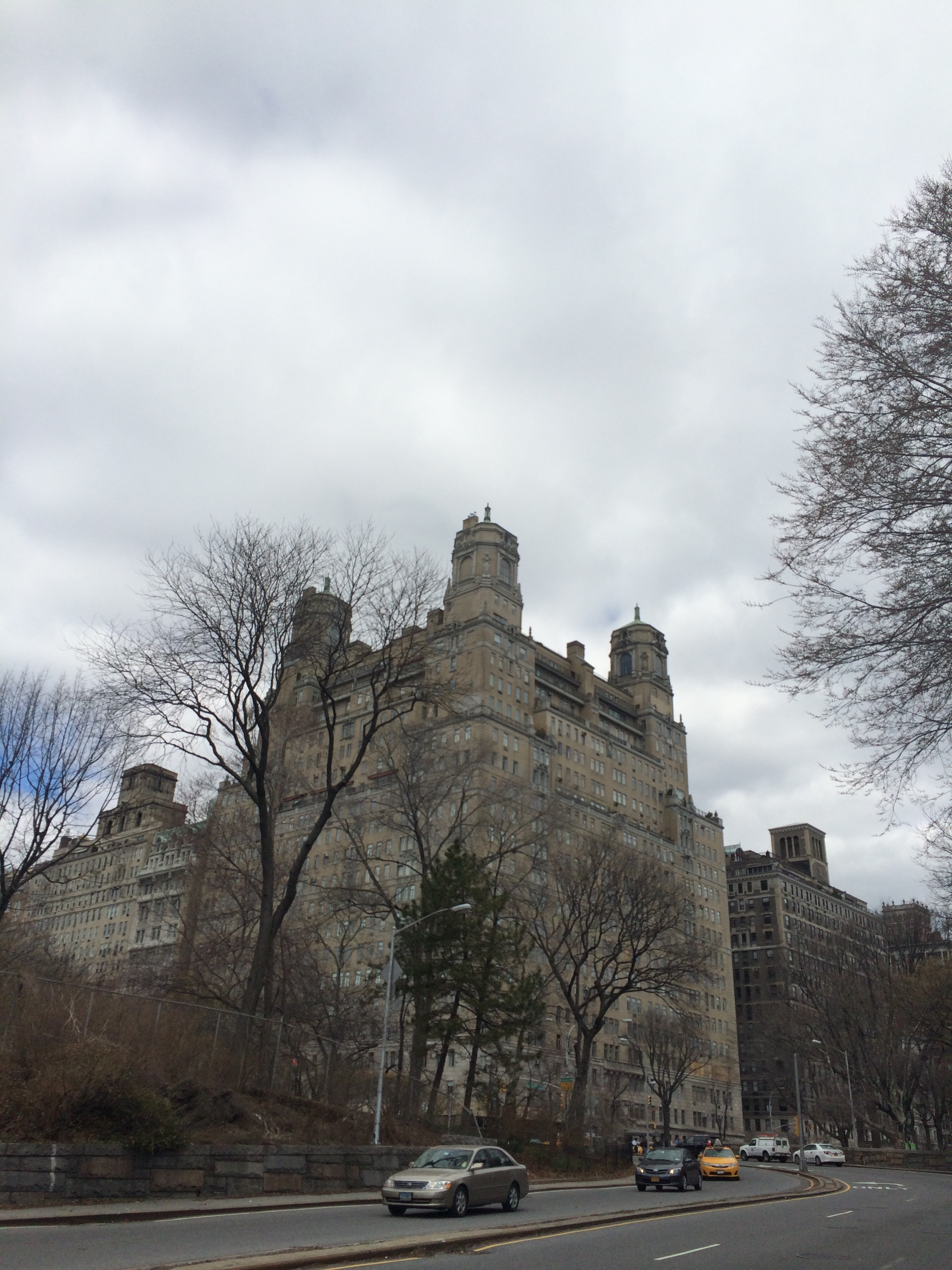
The Beresford as seen from the 79th Street Transverse in Central Park

The Beresford Central Park West Corporation, headed by Bennett Gordon, acquired the old Hotel Beresford from Frederick Brown in March 1925. Sugarman and Berger filed plans the next year for a high-rise apartment building to replace the hotel. These plans did not proceed, and Gordon resold the hotel to Max Verschleiser in 1927. Active Properties Inc. a syndicate led by banker and politician Henry Pollock, acquired the site in March 1928. Emery Roth filed plans that August for a 15-story building on Central Park West, between 81st and 82nd Streets, on behalf of the site's owner Manhattan Square Beresford Inc. The structure was to cost $3 million. Demolition of the old Beresford began the same month. By November 1928, the building's leasing agent L. J. Phillips & Co. was renting out apartments at rates averaging $1,000 per room.

Seventy percent of the suites had already been leased by May 1929. The construction of the new Beresford had prompted another developer to buy an adjacent group of row houses and develop an apartment building there. The Beresford's owners obtained a $5 million first mortgage loan for the building that July. HRH Construction was paid $150,000 for its role as general contractor for the Beresford. HRH also agreed to manage the Beresford (as well as the San Remo, which it also built) in exchange for two percent of the buildings' gross profits.

=== Rental house ===
The building officially opened on September 13, 1929, a little more than a month before the Wall Street Crash of 1929. At the time, Edgar Stix of L. J. Phillips & Co. predicted that all apartments at the building would be rented within the next month. This optimistic projection was based on the fact that an apartment with 13 rooms had been rented for $15,000 a year, while several five-room apartments were rented at rates of $7,500 a year. The Beresford had been able to rent out many of its suites for $1,000 per room but, after the Wall Street Crash, similar buildings on Central Park West were not able to match that rate. The New York Times reported in February 1931 that the Bank of United States, which had collapsed not long beforehand, was the actual owner of the Beresford. The bank's relationship to the Beresford became publicly known after a bank official testified that he had been ordered to burn the bank's documents in the Beresford's incinerator.

After the Bank of United States had collapsed, the New York State Banking Department took over the bank's holdings. At that point, the luxury residential market in Manhattan had declined significantly. By early 1934, the Banking Department was in the process of selling the Beresford to an unidentified investor. The Beresford had still not been sold by the next year, prompting the department to adjust the building's mortgage loan to facilitate its sale. The Banking Department had planned to subdivide some of the large suites in the mid-1930s, but these plans were canceled after the luxury market began to improve. The journalist Peter Osnos wrote that the Beresford and other Central Park West apartment houses contained many Jewish residents during the 1930s and 1940s, since these buildings were not "restricted", unlike others on the East Side.

In July 1940, a group of anonymous investors acquired the San Remo and Beresford, assuming a combined $7.4 million in mortgages on the two structures. The buildings themselves cost only $25,000, although they had cost a combined $10 million to build. One observer likened the sale to "buying the Queen Mary and the Queen Elizabeth for pocket change". The investment group was known as the Sanbere Corporation, a portmanteau of the two buildings' names. The New York Times subsequently reported that Max N. and Norbert Natanson owned the building for two decades. The Natansons sold the building in March 1959 to Sarah and Isidor Korein. The Korein family sold a partial ownership stake to investor Daniel Levy shortly thereafter. In 1961, the Koreins sold the leasehold under the Beresford to an investment syndicate represented by Walter J. Fried. At the time, it had 193 apartments and was still characterized as a luxury apartment house.

=== Cooperative conversion ===
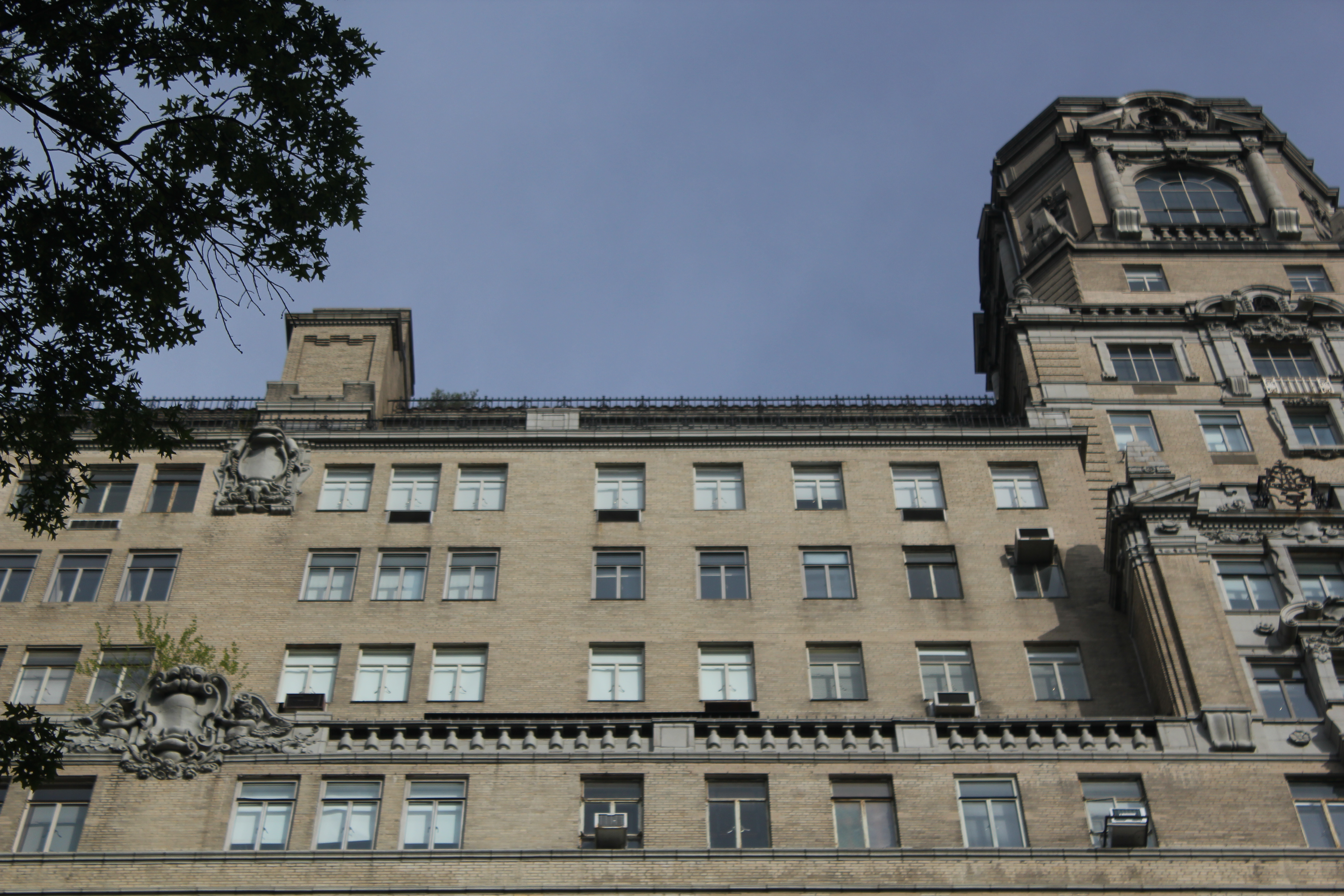
Top stories

By April 1962, the Beresford's owner Riker & Co. was planning to turn the building into a housing cooperative. The apartments were to be offered at prices between $16,500 and $55,650, with yearly maintenance fees ranging from $3,200 to $10,600. The Beresford officially became a co-op in June 1962 after existing tenants and newcomers bought shares in the co-op for half of the apartments. Riker & Co. then obtained a $4 million mortgage. The Beresford was one of twelve apartment buildings on Central Park West to be converted into housing cooperatives in the late 1950s and early 1960s. Pease & Elliman (later Douglas Elliman) was appointed as the managing agent for the Beresford in 1964. Town & Country magazine described the Beresford in the 1970s as having two doormen at each entrance and one operator at each elevator.

The co-op board initially did not seek official city-landmark status for the Beresford, as that would have raised the cost of maintenance. Nonetheless, the board members wanted to preserve as much of the original design as possible, including the windows. The Beresford's co-op board also periodically renovated the tenants' private elevator foyers, along with other shared interior spaces. The Beresford was protected as an official city landmark in 1987, and Akam Associates replaced Douglas Elliman as the building's leasing agent in 1989. During the 1990s, Crain's New York described the Majestic, Beresford, and El Dorado as having "become brand names that grow in strength as noted personalities move in". The Beresford's superintendent had even created a "Beresford Wall of Fame" with photographs of celebrities who lived there. Conversely, since there was a large number of celebrity residents, their presence did not affect property values, as in other neighborhoods with relatively few celebrity residents.

In the early 2000s, the co-op board passed a rule that limited the duration of apartment renovations. The rule was enacted after comedian Jerry Seinfeld spent more than two years renovating his apartment, prompting complaints from his neighbors. During the same time, twenty of the former maids' rooms at ground level were sold to tenants at an average price of $200,000. The northern tower was restored in 2005. That year, Crain's New York wrote that the Beresford was one of several "venerable apartment buildings on Riverside Drive and Central Park West".

== Notable residents ==
According to a 1996 article in New York magazine, many brokers classified the Beresford as one of five top-tier apartment buildings on Central Park West, largely because of the expansive southward views from the building. The others were 88 Central Park West, 101 Central Park West, the Dakota, and the San Remo.

- Bill Ackman, investor and hedge fund manager
- Michele Anthony, music industry executive
- Edwin Howard Armstrong, inventor
- Lee Bollinger, president of Columbia University
- David Brown, producer and writer; lived with Helen Gurley Brown
- Helen Gurley Brown, author, publisher, businesswoman; lived with David Brown
- Edith Bry, artist
- Irwin Chanin, developer
- Glenn Close, actress
- Jesse Crawford, organist
- Rick Elice, playwright; lived with Roger Rees
- Lewis Frankfort, businessman
- Allen Funt, producer
- Paul Goldberger, architecture critic; lives with Susan L. Solomon
- Benjamin Graham, financial analyst, economist, accountant, investor and professor
- Adolph Green, lyricist and playwright
- Kimberly Guilfoyle, television host
- Sheldon Harnick, lyricist and songwriter
- Richard Holbrooke, diplomat and writer; lived with Kati Marton
- Rock Hudson, actor
- Meyer Lansky, mobster
- Sidney Lumet, director and producer
- Kati Marton, writer; lived with Richard Holbrooke
- John McEnroe, tennis player; lived with Patty Smyth
- Marc Murphy, chef
- Phyllis Newman, actress and singer
- Mike Nichols, comedian and actor
- Vikram Pandit, banker
- Tony Randall, actor, comedian, singer
- Roger Rees, actor and director; lived with Rick Elice
- Mary Rodgers, author, composer, screenwriter
- Alex Rodriguez, baseball player
- Diana Ross, singer, songwriter, actress
- Diane Sawyer, journalist
- Dominique Senequier, businesswoman
- Jerry Seinfeld, comedian and actor; lives with Jessica Seinfeld
- Jessica Seinfeld, writer; lives with Jerry Seinfeld
- Beverly Sills, operatic soprano
- Paul Singer, hedge fund manager
- Patty Smyth, musician; lived with John McEnroe
- Susan L. Solomon, foundation executive; lives with Paul Goldberger
- Isaac Stern, violinist
- John Stossel, commentator
- Nathan Straus Jr., politician
- Bob Weinstein, film executive

The AMNH had also wanted to buy an apartment for its president in 1988, but the Beresford's co-op board voted against allowing the AMNH to buy a unit.

== Impact ==
Paul Goldberger of The New York Times wrote in 1976 that the Beresford was "a glorious building whose three castle‐like towers and fine siting have made it a long-beloved West Side landmark". Though Goldberger did not consider the Beresford to be among New York City's ten best apartment buildings, he called it a "cousin" of the San Remo, which did rank among Goldberger's top ten. In 1996, a writer for Interior Design magazine said the Beresford was "among the Upper West Side's top-drawer co-ops, the buildings that evoke the basic emotions of lust and envy when one thinks-or dreams-of the apartments within". Carter B. Horsley, a former writer for the Times, ranked the Beresford in 1998 as one of the "top 10 views of Central Park".

Critical commentary of the Beresford continued in the 21st century. During the 2000s, The New York Times said the presence of Central Park West's "architectural gems", such as the Beresford, contributed to increased housing prices on the eastern side of Central Park, along Fifth Avenue. John Freeman Gill of the Times wrote in 2005 that the Beresford was one of several buildings on Central Park West whose bases exhibited "the comfortable old solidity of limestone". The Wall Street Journal referred to the Beresford, Dakota, and San Remo as the "three grand dames of the West Side".

The building is a contributing property to the Central Park West Historic District, which was recognized by the U.S. National Register of Historic Places when its nomination was accepted on November 9, 1982. In 1984, the New York City Landmarks Preservation Commission (LPC) hosted hearings to determine whether the Century, Majestic, San Remo, Beresford, and El Dorado should be designated as city landmarks. Manhattan Community Board 7 supported all five designations, but the Beresford's co-op board was concerned about whether a landmark designation would hinder maintenance of the building. The LPC designated the Beresford as a city landmark on September 19, 1987. Landmarks commissioner Gene A. Norman said the Beresford's towers are part of the Central Park West skyline, contributing to the "image that most of the world has of New York". The Beresford is also part of the Upper West Side Historic District, which became a New York City historic district in 1990.

== See also ==
- National Register of Historic Places listings in Manhattan from 59th to 110th Streets
- List of New York City Designated Landmarks in Manhattan from 59th to 110th Streets
