= Edith Bry =

American painter (1898–1991)

- Born: November 30, 1898; St. Louis, Missouri, US
- Died: January 19, 1991 (aged 92); New York City, US
- Resting place: Mount Pleasant Cemetery, Hawthorne, New York
- Known for: Artist

Edith Bry (1898–1991) was an American painter, printmaker, and glass artist. During her long career she combined technical skill with an impulse to innovate. Critics noted her versatility, pointing to skill in handling oil painting, lithography, etching, drawing, watercolor, and wood carving. Her style ranged from realist to abstract and from what one critic called a "discipline of an inner reticence" to a "more dynamic emotional expressionism." Her early-career still lifes drew praise and a figure-group called "Exiles" received much attention following its acquisition by the Metropolitan Museum of Art. Her mid-career work was more expressive and abstract as she tried, as she put it, to rid herself "from the tyranny of nature." At the end of her career she was particularly known for semi-abstract work in glass and enamel, mainly of religious subjects.

== Early life and education ==
Bry was born on November 30, 1898. In 1910 or soon thereafter her family moved to Manhattan and she subsequently attended the Ethical Culture School on Central Park West. Bry showed an early interest in art. In the years before the outbreak of the First World War her parents would take her and her siblings on vacation trips to Europe and during these travels she was able to examine art in capital cities such as Paris and Madrid. In an early effort to teach herself to draw, she would copy the art postcards she bought. In 1915 she worked briefly in a New York batik studio. After graduating from high school in 1917 she studied for two years at the Art Students League. Her teachers there included J. Alden Weir, Winold Reiss, Guy Pène du Bois, Charles Locke, and Alexander Archipenko. During travels in Germany sometime not long after the end of the First World War she studied briefly under Hermann Struck and Siegfried Laboschin. Much later, in speaking of her formal art training, she told an interviewer, "I didn't want to study too long with any one teacher. A teacher can help along a certain line, but too many students stay too long with teachers, and imitate them. It is important for an artist to analyze his own work critically and to work by himself." In the late 1950s she worked with Abraham Rattner, a painter who, like Bry, showed a late-career interest in mosaic and stained-glass.

== Career in art ==
In 1927 Bry showed portraits and abstractions that she called "imaginative creations" in a solo exhibition at a gallery in Corsicana, Texas. The portraits showed George Gershwin, Rebecca West, Irwin Edman, and other well-known people. She told a reporter that by expressing her feelings the abstractions helped her to overcome depression and "turbulent moods." A year later the New York Post included her portrait of Carl Van Doren in its Saturday Gravure section and two of her drawings were included in a show organized by the Opportunity Gallery. (Note: The Opportunity Gallery was founded in 1927 by the artist Gifford Beal and a small group of patrons. Located in the Art Center on East 56th Street in Manhattan, it offered free exhibition space to new artists and sought no profit from sales of their work. Each exhibition was selected by a different artist.) Over the next few years her work appeared in group shows at the same gallery and in the gallery of a printer of limited edition books. In 1932 she exhibited with two other women in the G.R.D. Gallery. (Note: The G. R. D. Gallery was a nonprofit organization that opened early in 1928. Named in honor of the artist Gladys R. Dick, its founder was the philanthropist Jean S. Roosevelt (Mrs. Philip Roosevelt) and its art director was Kimon Nicolaïdes.) The still lifes in that show drew comment from a critic for The New York Times who praised her "knowing technique" and appreciated her enigmatic titles. ("Atavic," for a still life of red cabbage, beets, and eggplant, was one.) She joined the National Association of Women Painters and Sculptors in 1934 and contributed paintings to some of its exhibitions, but she did not take an active role in that organization. When she showed line drawings in a 1935 exhibition at the National Association's Argent Galleries, a critic praised her skill, writing that her "drawings might bid Picasso look to his laurels. In October 1935 she held a solo exhibition of oil paintings at a commercial gallery in St. Louis. A notice of the show in the St. Louis Star drew attention to her versatility. "Her output," it said, "is large, not only in oil, but in etching, lithography, wood carving, and sanguine crayon."

Edith Bry, Exiled, lithograph, 9 × 11 7/8 inches

The following year she was given a solo exhibition at the Grant Gallery in which she showed still lifes, landscapes, and scenes showing indigenous Mexicans. (Note: A collector, author, and former manager of the Anderson Galleries, Walter M. Grant founded and directed the Grant Gallery between 1934 and about 1938.) In 1937 she showed a lithograph called "Exiled" in the International Print Makers Exhibition at the Los Angeles Museum. The Los Angeles Times headed its article on the show with a reproduction of the print and its critic said it was "grim." This 1936 lithograph and a 1937 painting she made of the same scene were later purchased by the Metropolitan Museum of Art. The lithograph can be seen at right.

Bry joined the nonprofit Studio Guild in 1937. (Note: Founded in 1924 and managed by Grace Pickett, the Studio Guild aimed to promote the work of artists through its exhibitions. It was supported by donations from wealthy patrons, dues from artist members, and periodic fundraising events, including an annual masked ball.) During the next few years she participated in the Studio Guild's exhibitions. She also helped to arrange Guild-sponsored events that raised money for overseas relief work. In 1938, for example, she organized the sale of works donated by 130 artists for funds to support the work of the Joint Distribution Committee to help European Jews escape Nazi persecution. A year later she contributed works to a Guild exhibition that circulated among museums and galleries around the country. In 1940, when the Metropolitan Museum of Art put "Exiled" on view, a New York Sun reporter interviewed Bry. In the interview, she said she intended the painting to convey a sense of finality and doom. While she recognized that it was topical, she said there was nothing propagandistic in her intent.

In 1941 Bry became active in an artists' advocacy group called the Federation of Modern Painters and Sculptors. (Note: A group of New York artists formed the Federation of Modern Painters and Sculptors in the spring of 1940. All had resigned from the American Artists' Congress to protest its "Stalinist line" after the congress had endorsed the Soviet invasion of Finland. Founders included include Isabel Bishop, Ilya Bolotowsky, Dorothy Eisner, Anne Goldthwaite, Adolph Gottlieb, and Balcomb Greene.) She showed in its first and in subsequent annual exhibitions and participated in special exhibitions as well. Her contribution of a collage called "Equations" in the 35th annual exhibition of 1976 seems to have been her last. She served as recording secretary and vice-president of the organization and in 1945 was elected its president.

Bry continued to participate in group exhibitions during the war years, but she also volunteered her time in war-related work. In 1942 she began art classes for wounded soldiers, a year later she made war bond posters and made skin-draft drawings for a plastic surgeon, and in 1945 she painted irises for artificial eyes.

Edith Bry, Palin, 1937, lithograph, 12 1/2 x 8 3/4 inches

Before the war Bry had traveled to Guatemala which then became the source of much of her later work. Working from sketches she made then, she finished a lithograph called "Palin" in 1945 (seen at left). Showing Guatemalan Indians grouped around a Ceiba tree, the print was commissioned by a commercial gallery called Associated American Artists. In the post-war years she continued to show oils, watercolors, and prints in group exhibitions held by the associations of which she was a member and in 1951 was given a solo exhibition at the John Heller gallery. The latter drew critics' attention for what one called a shift in her work from "visual sobriety" to expressionistic feeling. Bry explained the transition as an effort to free herself from the "tyranny of nature." She aimed to move from painting subjects "in the customary sense like a figure or scene" toward a more direct expression of emotion. In these deeply felt works she increasingly showed religious subjects.

In the late 1950s Bry began to experiment with works in fused glass and vitreous enamel and thereafter began to make fused glass panels mainly for places of worship. After her death in 1991 she was best known for these works of the 1960s and 1970s. In 1983 the Loeb Student Art Center at New York University gave her a retrospective exhibition.

=== Artistic style ===
Edith Bry, Fire Island 3, 1964, watercolor, 5 x 6 1/2 inches

Edith Bry, Moonlit Ocean Seascape, about 1980, collage, 35 x 40 inches

Bry was a versatile artist who painted in oils, drew using graphite and crayon, and produced watercolors, and pastels. She made lithographs, woodcuts, and etchings. She did wood carving, mosaics, and large works in glass employing fused glass and enamel. Although her style evolved considerably during her long career, she avoided non-objectivism. She deployed degrees of abstraction, beginning with social realism and proceeding to a nearly free-form abstract expressionism. The progression was not clear-cut, however. Early in her career she made what she called "imaginative paintings" and in mid-career she made paintings that were, she said, "free harmonies of beautiful glowing colors." Late in her career she was still producing realist work such as the watercolor, "Fire Island 3," shown at right. For the most part her work could be described as semi-abstract. Its subjects were discernible, whether easily so, or only on close examination. She was seen as an expressive artist. A critic noted a tension between two styles of expressive work, one that revealed the "discipline of an inner reticence" and another consisting of a "more dynamic emotional expressionism." Critics saw this expressive content in both her realist and the more abstract paintings. Her collage, "Moonlit Ocean Seascape," at left, shows her late abstract style.

She was noted for her skill in composition and handling of color. In 1932 a critic praised three still life paintings for "their good spacial design and pleasing relation of color." Another said she arranged "her subject matter in compositions as interesting for their color harmonies as they are for their harmonies of form." A few years later Howard Devree, of The New York Times praised her "growth in compositional conception, and advance in paint values and ... mature and gratifying sureness of approach" and a critic for the New York Post said she had a flair for composition: "she places the objects in her still lifes in pleasing relations of form and space; the flowers in her bouquets have a spacial existence, air flows between the blossoms and around them."

When painting in oils Bry usually used a palette knife rather than a brush. During much of her career, she worked five days a week from about 10:00 am to 6:00 pm.

== Personal life and family ==
Bry was born in St. Louis, Missouri, on November 28, 1898. She was the daughter of Louis Bry and Melanie Scharff Bry, and had four siblings. In 1880 Louis Bry, Sr. emigrated to the United States from Rawitsch, Prussia (now Rawicz, Poland) and became a partner of his older brother, Nathan, in running successful department stores in Camden, Arkansas and Memphis, Tennessee. (Note: Founded by Nathan in 1872, Bry's Department Store was the first business of its type in Camden, establishing a number of innovations that helped it to succeed. A cousin took over management when Nathan and Louis Bry moved to St. Louis in 1893. Later, the two brothers founded another Bry's Department Store in Memphis. In a short while it built the business into one of the largest department stores in the American South. The same Bry cousin, Isaac Block, was its first manager.) The brothers also operated a clothing manufacturing business called Bry & Brother Cloak Company in St. Louis. In 1906 Louis moved to New York. There, he partnered with a relative named Edwin Bry (not his son), in a woolen manufacturing business with offices in Philadelphia and New York. (Note: This Edwin Bry was the son of Jean Bry who had been born in Berlin and was a fabric importer in Manhattan. The business they ran together was called Edwin & Louis Bry, Inc., incorporated in 1915. Like Martin Edwin Bry, this Edwin Bry had a brother named Louis. It had its main office in Philadelphia.) (Note: Louis Bry's brother Nathan, had a son named Martin Erwin Bry (August 23, 1891-September 12, 1955). It is unclear why Louis Bry decided to name one of his sons Martin Edwin. Both sons made their careers in the clothing business, one in St. Louis and the other in New York.) He later served as a consultant to a business run by his sons Edwin and Louis. (Note: Edwin Bry and Louis Bry, Jr., ran a fabric manufacturing business called Brybro in New York.) Louis and Melanie were married in St. Louis in 1890.

Edith Bry, Photo of the woodcarving over fireplace in library of her home

Bry married in 1921. Her husband, Maurice Shevelson Benjamin, was an engineer and founder of a brokerage firm called Benjamin, Hill & Company. They remained married to each other for the rest of their lives. Their only child, Bry Benjamin, was born in 1924 and died in 2009. (Note: Bry Benjamin graduated from Yale University and Harvard Medical School and established a career in medicine. In 1955 he married Annette Francis Levy. After their divorce he married Marianne V. Gupta, a librarian, in 1981. He died in 2009. He published a book with his first wife, In case of Emergency; What to Do Until the Doctor Arrives (Doubleday, Garden City, N.Y., 1965).) In 1929 the family moved to a large apartment on an upper floor in the newly opened Beresford building on Central Park West. The apartment had been designed for them in Art Deco style by a well-known architect, Ely Jacques Kahn. Bry carved the wood panel that was set over the fireplace in the library. The panel can be seen in the photo at right and in the portrait of Bry and her husband at top. Edith Bry died at home in New York on January 19, 1991.
