= Thiry de Bry =

Belgian goldsmith

Thiry de Bry (1495–1590), son of Thiry de Bry the elder and father of Theodor de Bry, was a goldsmith in 16th-century Liège. He made a number of chalices and reliquaries that were still extant in the 18th and 19th centuries.
