= Lynn Bry =

American physician

- Education: Washington University in St. Louis; Cornell University
- Known for: Associate Professor of Pathology
- Scientific career
- Workplaces: Brigham and Women's Hospital, Harvard Medical School
- Website: https://physiciandirectory.brighamandwomens.org/details/1395/lynn-bry-pathology-boston

Lynn Bry is a physician, anaerobic microbiologist, and microbial geneticist at Brigham & Women's Hospital, and Harvard Medical School. She has created multiple multi-institutional platforms to support scientific, clinical and educational activities, including the MadSci Network, Crimson prospective collection resource, Massachusetts Host-Microbiome Center, and Partners Healthcare-wide Pathogen Genomic Surveillance Program. She has also founded or co-founded successful start-up companies including iSpecimen and ConsortiaTX. She was awarded her MD and a PhD in Molecular Microbiology and Pathogenesis from Washington University School of Medicine. Her research studies host-microbiome interactions and their application to develop new therapeutics for human disease. She has authored or co-authored >70 peer-reviewed articles and book chapters, including original papers in Science detailing a molecular model of host-microbial cross-talk in the small intestine, and in Nature Medicine demonstrate therapeutic use of defined commensal microbes to reverse food allergies. Bry teaches medical school courses and is also a lecturer and mentor for the Project Success Program at Harvard Medical School.

While at Washington University, Bry founded and became Executive Director of The Madsci Network, an Ask-A-Scientist service based on the World Wide Web. The service involves more than 900 globally situated volunteer scientists who field questions from the general public and from students in kindergarten through the 12th grade. It has received more than 41,000 questions in subjects from astronomy to zoology. The site was nominated for a Webby Award in science, and has been named one of the top 50 science sites on the web by Popular Science magazine. Bry has served as a consultant to the United States Department of Education concerning the use of the Internet for science education and has spoken before members of the Office of Science & Technology Policy and the United States Library of Congress concerning the establishment of distributed expert systems.

She is a Board-certified Pathologist and specializes in clinical laboratory testing in molecular diagnostics, microbiology and immunology. She routinely works with research groups to develop novel markers into diagnostic assays that can be run on platforms used in clinical laboratories. She also maintains an NIH-funded research laboratory, studying host-pathogen-commensal interactions in the gut.

== Education ==
Bry received her bachelor's degree in Genetics and Development from Cornell University, then entered the Medical Scientist Training Program at Washington University School of Medicine in St. Louis. She was the first microbiology graduate student of Dr. Jeffrey I. Gordon and used her background in microbiology and microbial genetics to develop novel systems for studying host-microbial cross-talk within the gastrointestinal tract. She was awarded her MD and a PhD in Molecular Microbiology and Pathogenesis in 1998. She subsequently entered the residency program in Clinical Pathology at Brigham and Women's Hospital. While in her second year of the residency program, she was awarded a Howard Hughes Research Fellowship for Physicians to pursue a postdoctoral fellowship in molecular immunology in the laboratory of Dr. Michael B. Brenner at Brigham and Women's Hospital.
