= Theodor de Bry =

Walloon engraver and publisher (1528–1598)

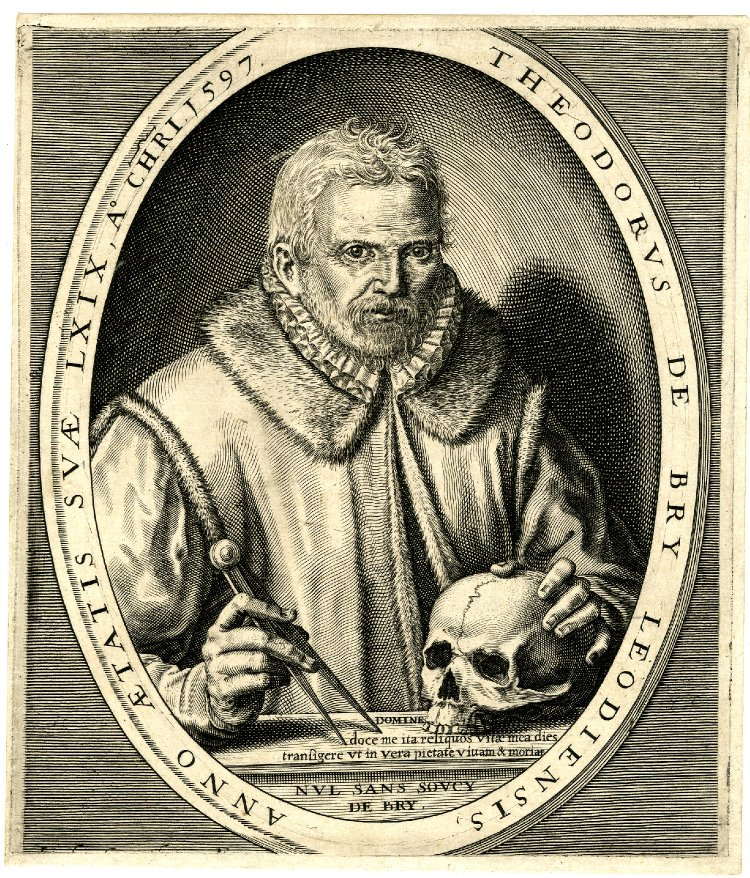
- Engraved self-portrait of Theodorus de Bry
- Born: 1528; Liège
- Died: March 27, 1598 (aged 69–70); Frankfurt
- Known for: Engraving
- Notable work: Collectiones peregrinatiorum in Indiam orientalem et Indiam occidentalem (1590–1633)

Theodore de Bry (also Theodorus de Bry; 1527/28 – 27 March 1598) was a Walloon engraver, goldsmith, editor and publisher, famous for his depictions of early European expeditions to the Americas. The Catholic authorities forced de Bry, a Protestant, to flee his native, Spanish-controlled Southern Netherlands. He moved around Europe, starting from his birth on the city of Liège in the Prince-Bishopric of Liège, then to Strasbourg, Antwerp, London and Frankfurt, where he settled.

De Bry created a large number of engraved illustrations for his books. Most of his books were based on first-hand observations by explorers, even if De Bry himself, acting as a recorder of information, never visited the Americas. To modern eyes, many of the illustrations seem formal but detailed.

== Biography ==
Theodorus de Bry was born in 1528 in Liège, Prince-Bishopric of Liège (in modern Belgium), to a family which had escaped the destruction of the city of Dinant in 1466 during the Wars of Liège by the Duke of Burgundy, Philip the Good and his son Charles the Bold. As a man he trained under his grandfather, Thiry de Bry the Elder (died 1528), and under his father, Thiry de Bry the Younger (1495–1590), who were jewellers and engravers, engraving copper plates. The art of copper plate engraving was the technology required at that time for printing images and drawings as part of books. In 1524 Thiry de Bry the Younger married Catherine le Blavier, daughter of Conrad le Blavier de Jemeppe. Their son, Theodore de Bry, also became a jeweller and engraver.

Theodore de Bry became a Protestant, and in 1570 was sentenced to perpetual banishment and his goods were confiscated. He moved to Strasbourg, along the west bank of the Rhine. In 1577, he moved to Antwerp in the Duchy of Brabant, which was part of the Spanish Netherlands or Southern Netherlands and Low Countries of that time (16th century), where he further developed and used his skills as a copper engraver. Between 1585 and 1588 he lived in London, where he met the geographer Richard Hakluyt and began to collect stories and illustrations of various European explorations, most notably from Jacques Le Moyne de Morgues.

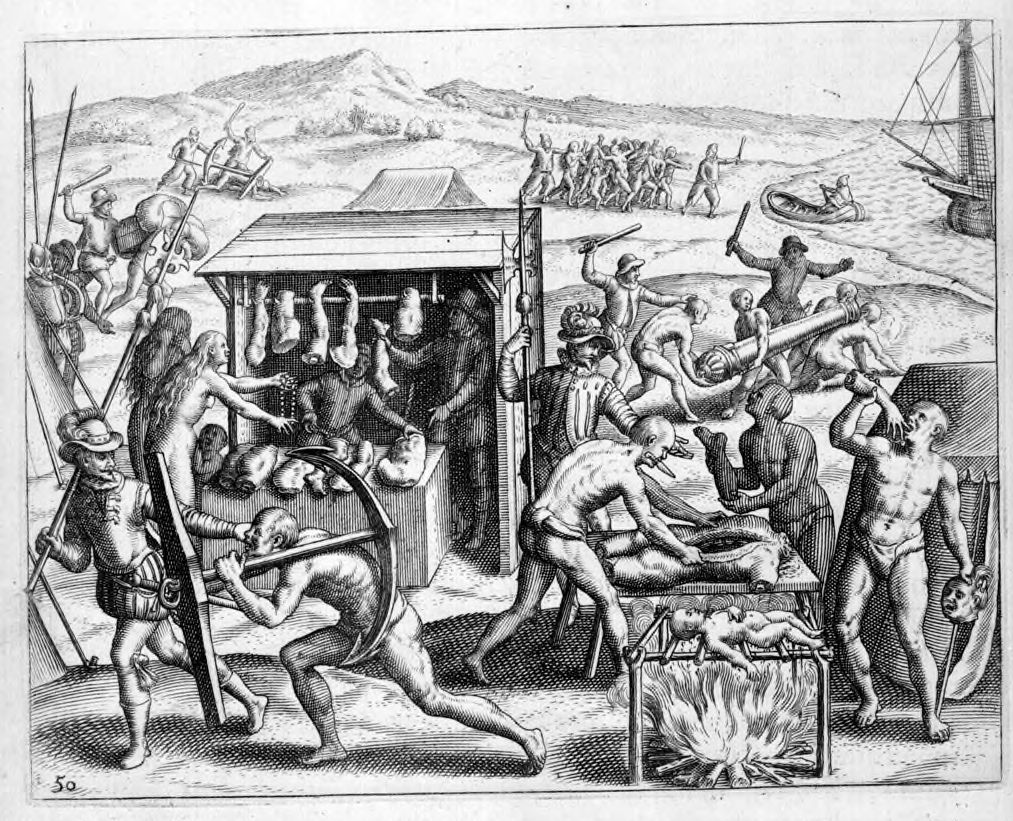
Depiction of Spanish atrocities in the New World, as recounted by Bartolomé de las Casas in Narratio Regionum indicarum per Hispanos Quosdam devastatarum verissima, illustrations designed by Joos van Winghe.

In 1588, Theodorus and his family moved permanently to Frankfurt-am-Main, where he became a citizen and began to plan his first publications. The most famous one is known as Les Grands Voyages, i.e., "The Great Travels", or "The Discovery of America". He also published the largely identical India Orientalis series, as well as many other illustrated works on a wide range of subjects. His books were published in Latin, and were also translated into German, English and French to reach a wider reading public.

In 1590 Theodorus de Bry and his sons published a new, illustrated edition of Thomas Harriot's A Briefe and True Report of the New Found Land of Virginia about the first English settlements in North America (in modern-day North Carolina). His illustrations were based on the watercolor paintings of colonist John White. The book sold well, and the next year de Bry published a new one about the first French attempts to colonize Florida: Fort Caroline, founded by Jean Ribault and René de Laudonnière. It featured 43 illustrations based on paintings of Jacques Le Moyne de Morgues, one of the few survivors of Fort Caroline. The images and descriptions feature the Timucuans. Jacques de Moyne had planned to publish his account of his expeditions but died in 1587. According to de Bry's account, he had bought de Moyne's paintings from his widow in London and used them as a basis for the engravings.

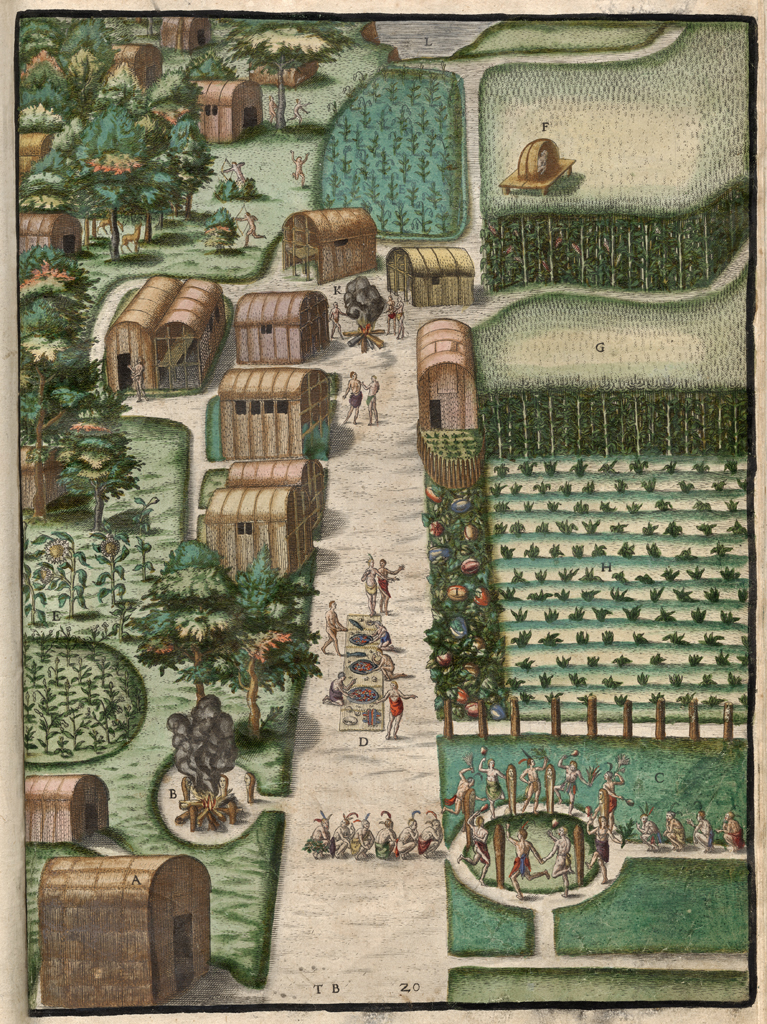
Village of Secoton, engraved illustration by de Bry accompanying Thomas Hariot's book of 1588 A Briefe and True Report of the New Found Land of Virginia

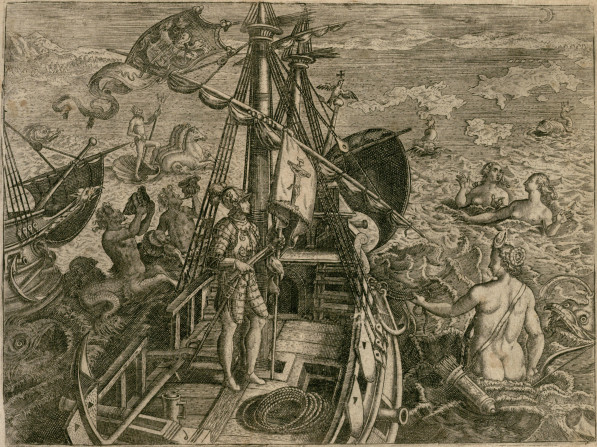
Engraving of Columbus, the discoverer of the New World, 1594

He and his son John-Theodore made adjustments to both the texts and the illustrations of the original accounts, on the one hand in function of his own understanding of Le Moyne's paintings, and, most importantly, to please potential buyers. The Latin and German editions varied markedly, in accordance with the differences in estimated readership.

The verisimilitude of many of de Bry's illustrations is questionable; not least because he never crossed the Atlantic. Amerindians look like Mediterranean Europeans, and illustrations mix different tribal customs and artifacts. In addition to day-to-day life of the American natives, Theodore de Bry even included a few depictions of cannibalism; largely thanks to the accounts of Amerigo Vespucci this was already a very common element in images showing a personification of the Americas. All in all, the vast amount of these illustrations and texts influenced the European perception of the New World, Africa, and Asia.

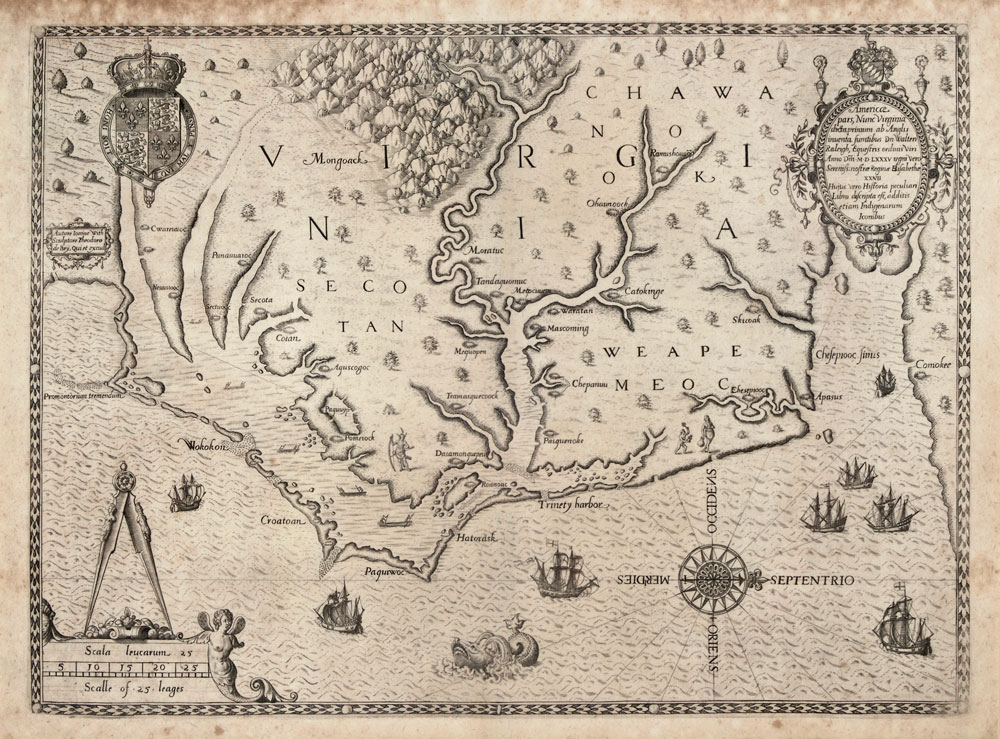
The Map of Virginia, circa 1585–1586 (centered on Albemarle Sound)

Among other works he engraved a set of twelve plates illustrating the Procession of the Knights of the Garter in 1587, and a set of thirty-four plates illustrating the Procession at the Obsequies of Sir Philip Sidney; plates for Thomas Harriot's Brief and True Report of the New Found Land of Virginia (Frankfurt, 1590); the plates for the six volumes of Jean-Jacques Boissard's Romanae Urbis Topogrephia et Antiquitates (1597–1602); and, with Boissard, a series of 100 portraits and biographies of humanists and Protestants entitled Icones Virorum Illustrium (1597–1599).

De Bry had been assisted by his two sons, Johann Theodor de Bry (1561–1623) and Johann Israel de Bry (1565–1609), who after their father's death in Frankfurt-am-Main on 27 March 1598, carried on the Collectiones (expanded to voyages in Asia, reaching 30 volumes) and the illustration of Boissard's work and also added to the Icones and other significant publications, like Robert Fludd's works on the microcosm and macrocosm.

His work and engravings can today be consulted at many museums around the world, including Liège, his birthplace, and at Brussels in Belgium. In France, they are housed at the Library of the Marine Historical Service at the Château de Vincennes on the outskirt of Paris. In the US, there are copies at the Public Library of New York, at the University of California at Los Angeles, and elsewhere. In Argentina, it is possible to find copies at the Museo Maritimo de Ushuaia in Tierra del Fuego and at the Navy Department of Historic Studies in Buenos Aires. In Scotland, eleven titles are listed in the catalogue of Edinburgh University Library (Special Collections).

== Works ==
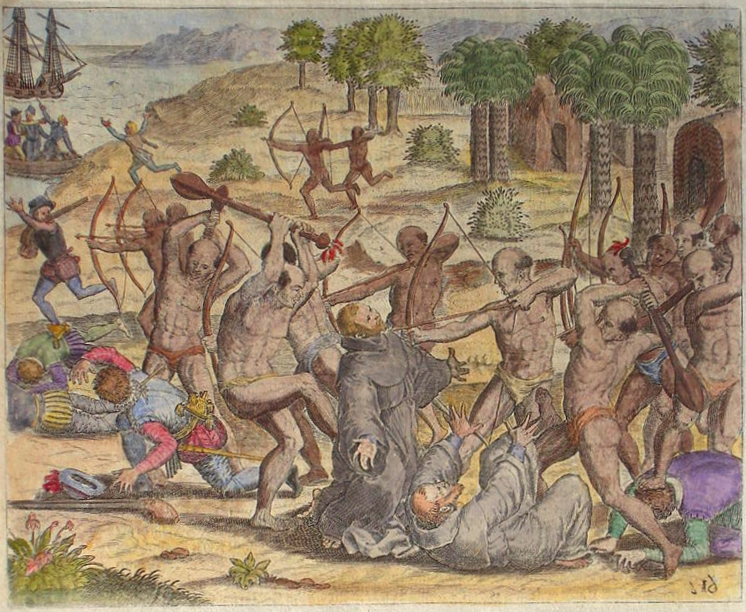
The Natives of Cumaná attack the mission after Gonzalo de Ocampo's slaving raid. Colored copperplate by Theodor de Bry, published in the "Relación brevissima de las indias".

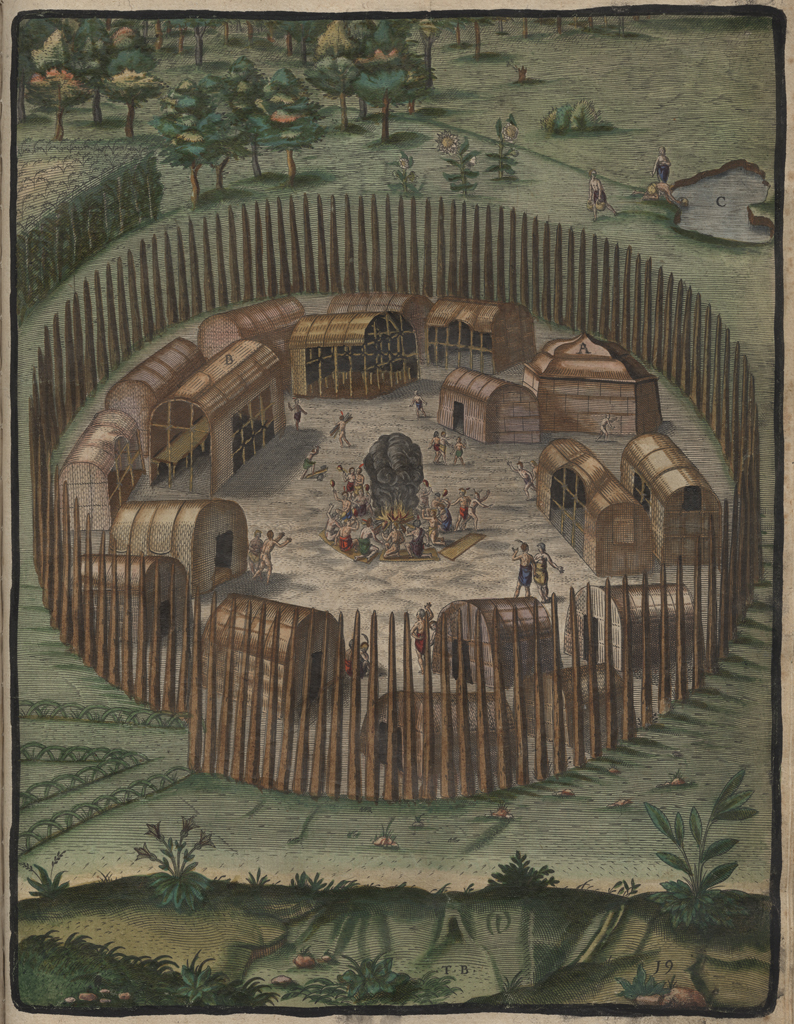
The Towne of Pomeiooc, engraved illustration by de Bry accompanying Thomas Hariot's book of 1588 A Briefe and True Report of the New Found Land of Virginia

- 1590–1634 Bry (Theodore de). Collectiones peregrinatiorum in Indiam orientalem et Indiam occidentalem, XIII partibus comprehenso a Theodoro, Joan-Theodoro de Bry, et a Matheo Merian publicatae. Francofurti. 1590–1634. Fol. (Parts I to VI, edited and illustrated by T. de Bry, parts VII to IX by his sons, Johann Theodor and Johann Israel de B.; parts X to XII by J. T. de B., and part XIII by M.Merian.)
- 1596 (America. Part VI.) Historiae ab A. Bezono ... scriptae, sectio tertio....in hac reperies qua natione Hispani... Peruani regni provincias occuparint, capto rege Atabaliba, etc. (3d part of G. Benzoni's Historia del Mondo Nuovo.) Map and plates, 2 parts. Frankfurt. 1596. Fol.
- 1617 (Second edition). Oppenheimii. 1617. Fol.
- 1595 (German edition). Frankfurt. 1595. Fol.
- 1613 (Second German edition). Frankfurt. 1613. Fol.
- 1599 (America. Part VII). Descriptionem trium itinerum. . .equitis F. Draken....J. Hauckens.. .G. Ralegh ... in Latinum sermonem conversaauctore G. Artus. Maps and plates. 3 pt. Francofurti. 1599. Fol.
- 1625 (Second edition). Francofurti. 1625. Fol.
- 1602 (America. Part IX). De novi orbis natura (by J.de Acosta). Accessit... S. de Weert and...O. a. Noort ....Plates. 5 pt. Francofurti. 1602. Fol.
- 1633 (Second edition). Francofurti. 1633. Fol.
- 1601 (German edition). Yon Gelegenheit der elemente natur de Neuer Welt. J. H. v. Linschoten. Frankfurt. 1601. Fol.
- 1602 (Latin and German edition). Francofurti. 1602.
- 1620 (Latin). Francofurti. 1634. Fol.

== See also ==
- Black Legend, anti-Spanish propaganda

== Gallery ==
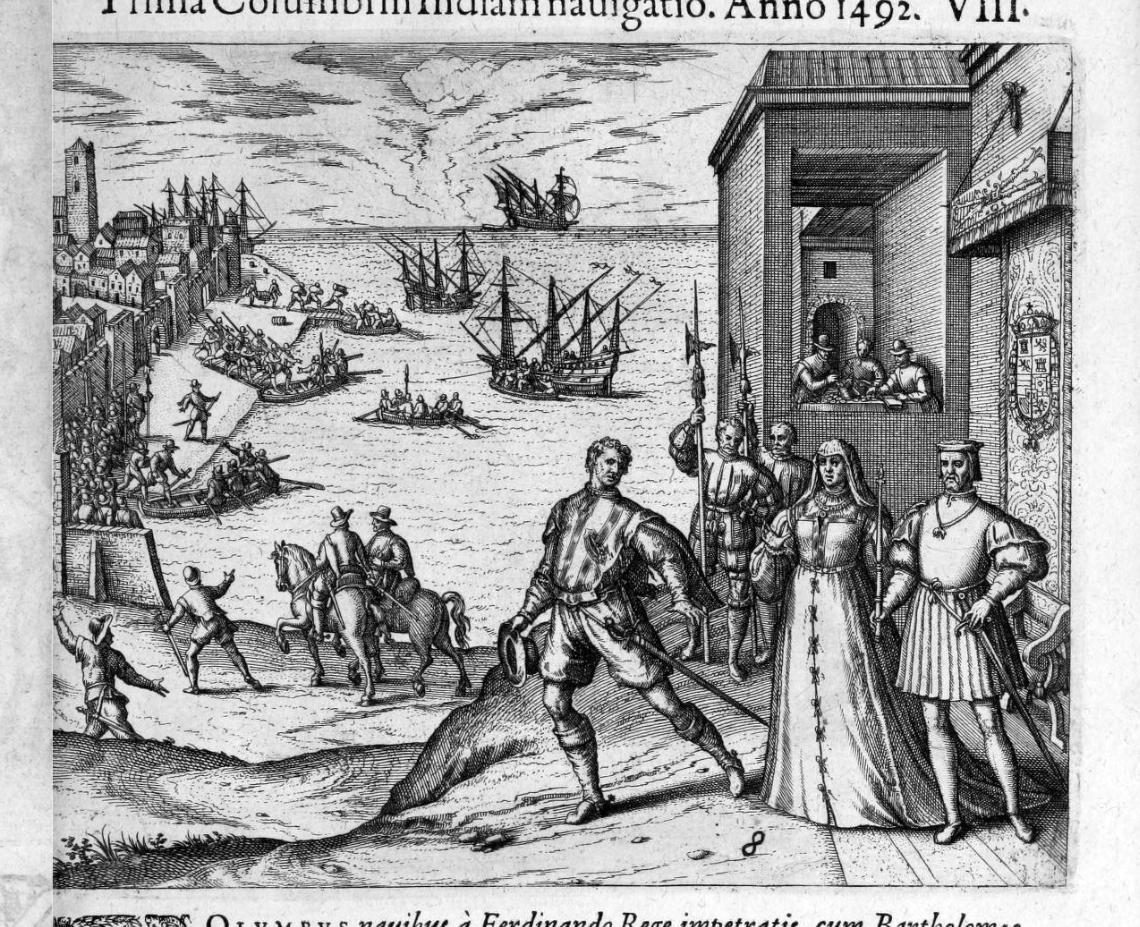
King Ferdinand & Queen Isabella watching Christopher Columbus departing for the Caribbean - Americae pars Quarta, 1594

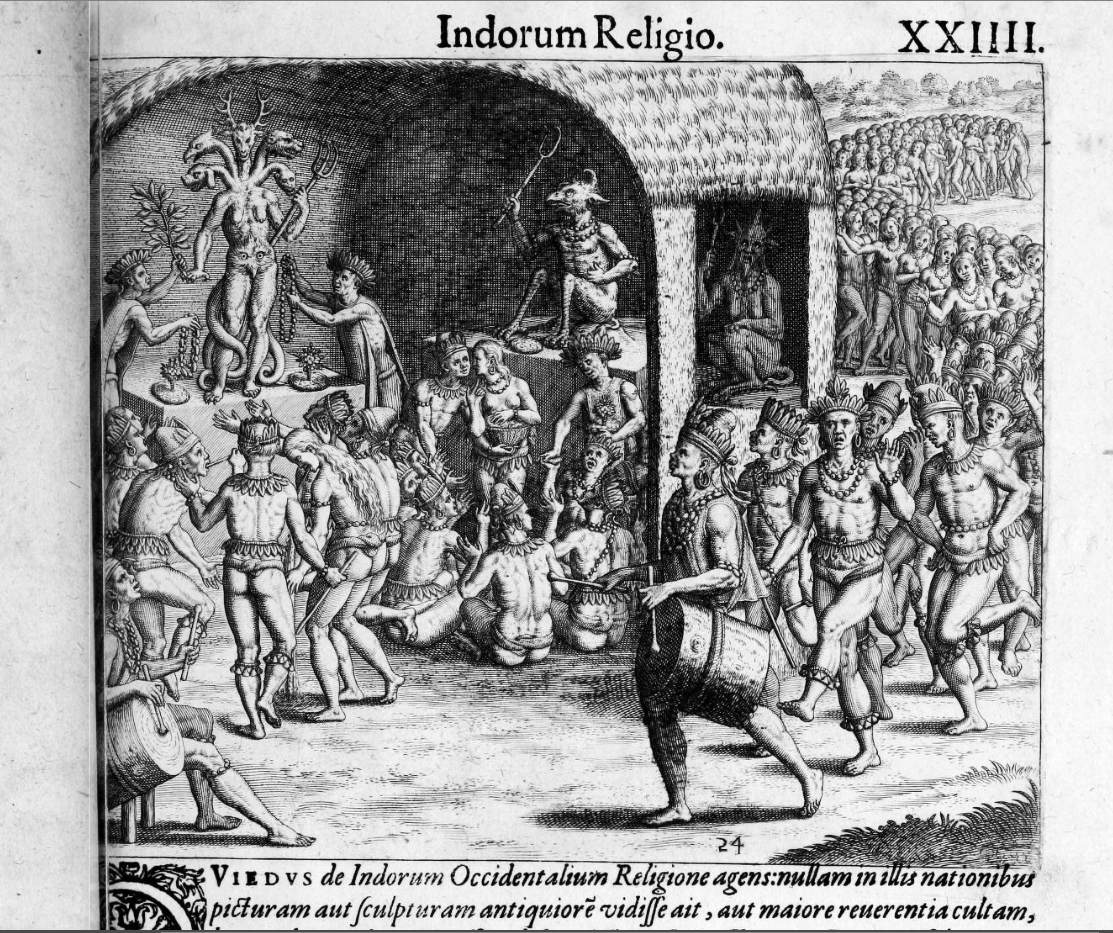
Indians worshipping the Caco-Demon - Americae pars Quarta, 1594

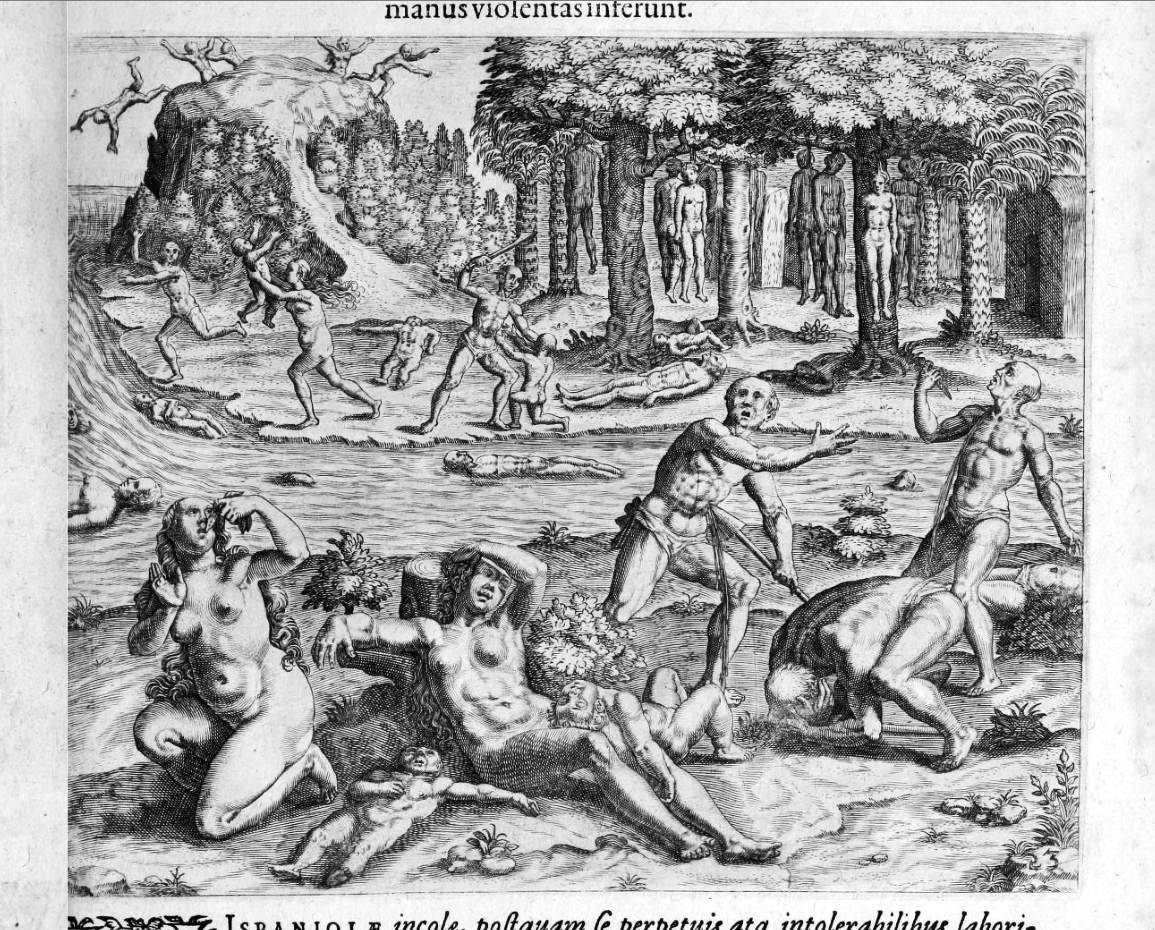
The tortuous workload inflicted upon the Indians led many to self injury. - Americae pars Quarta, 1594

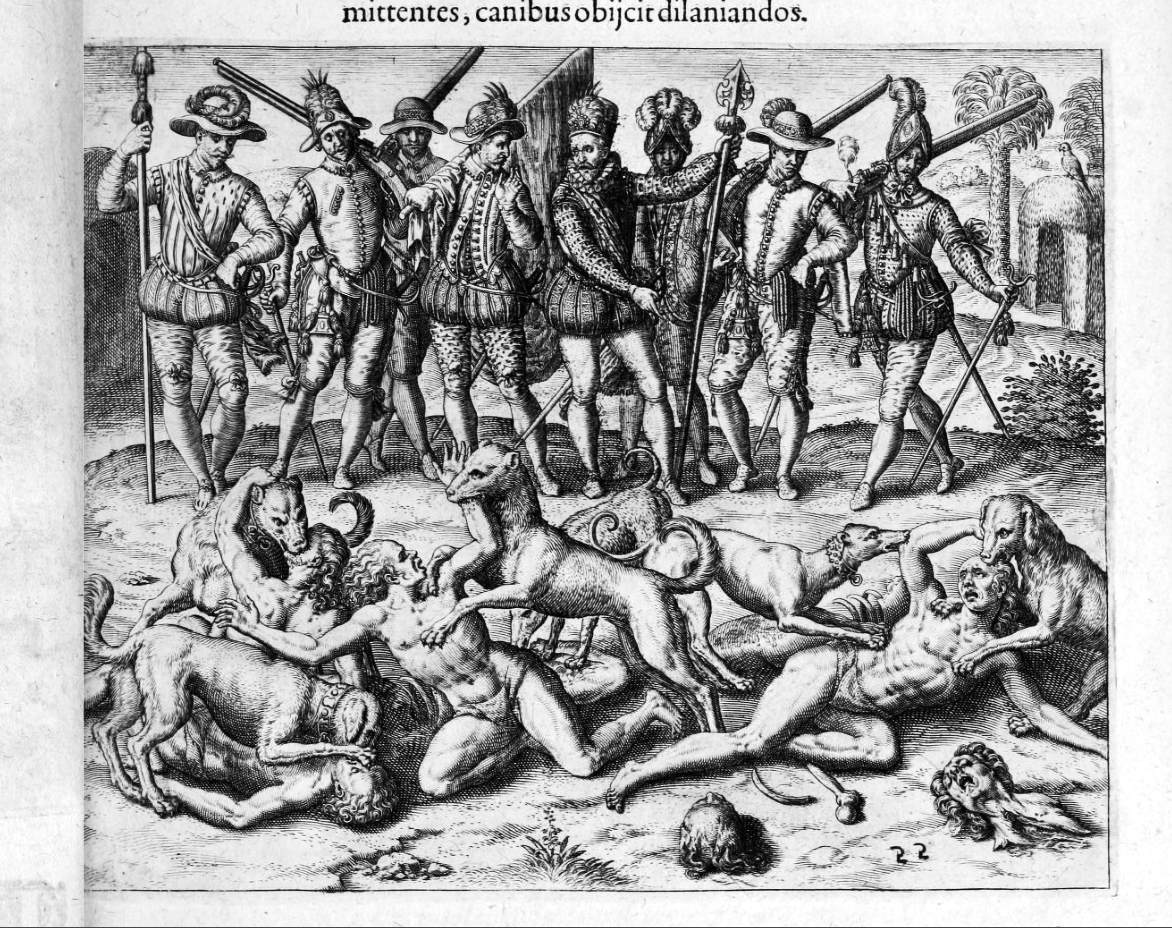
Valboa accuses the Indians of sodomy & they are torn to pieces by dogs as punishment - Americae pars Quarta, 1594

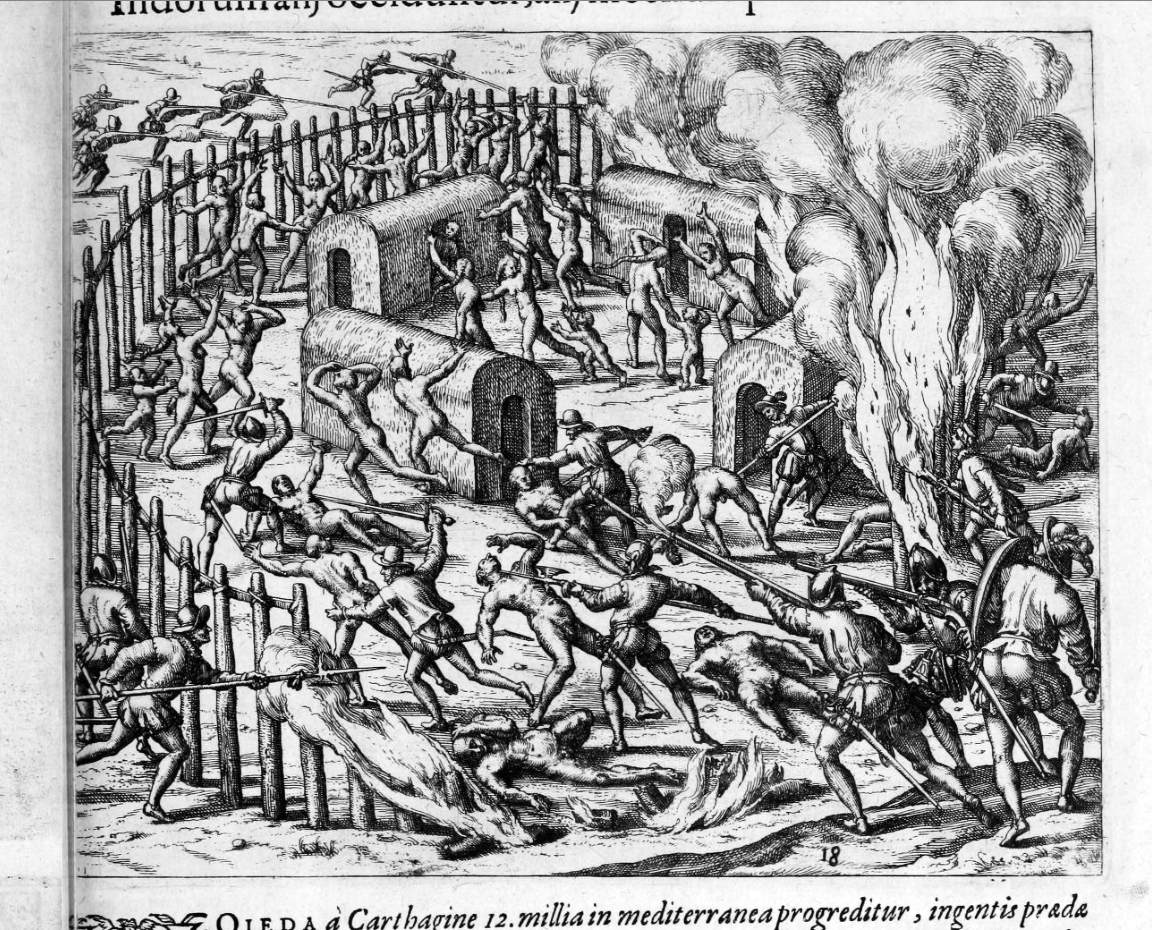
(Alphonso de) Hoieda murders Indians in hopes of finding their gold - Americae pars Quarta, 1594

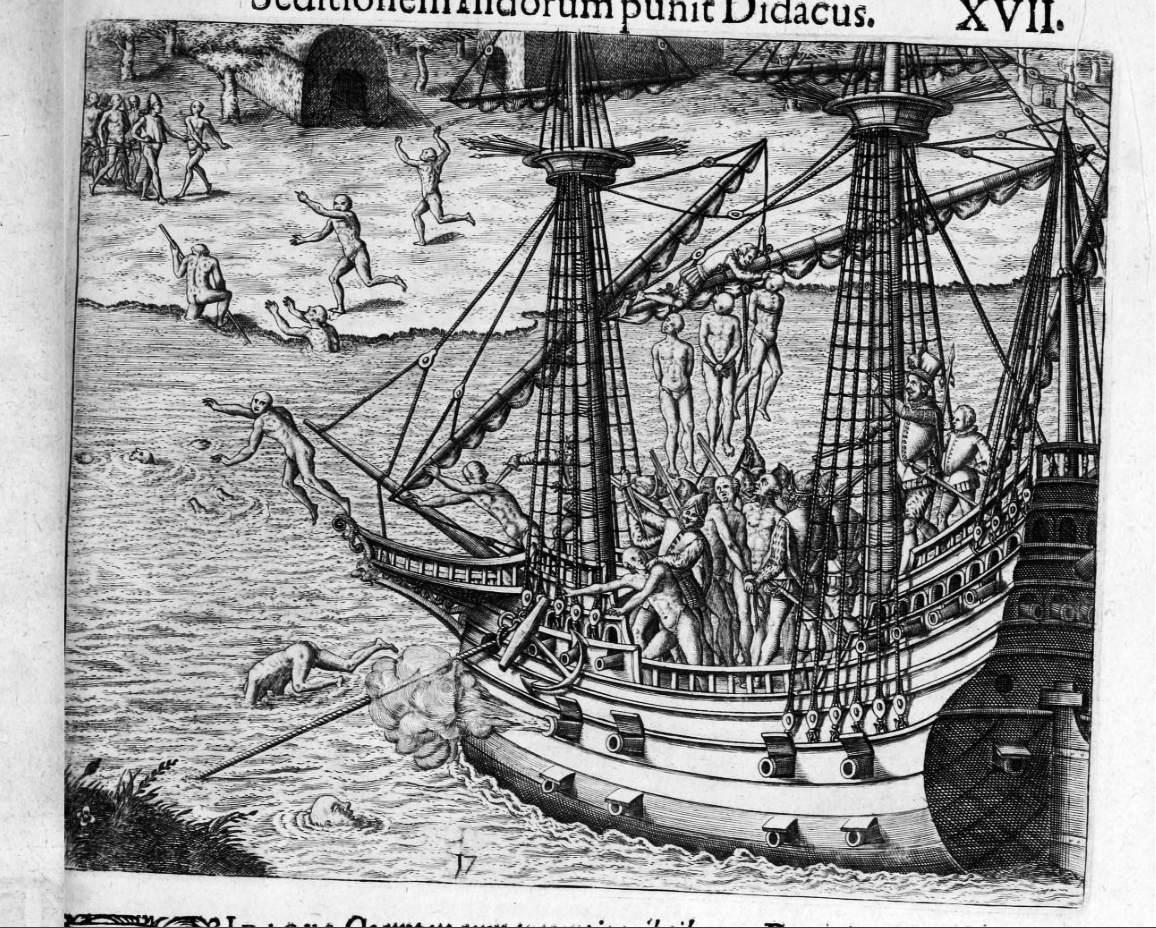
Didacus Ocampus punishes the rebellion of the Indians in Cumana - Americae pars Quarta, 1594

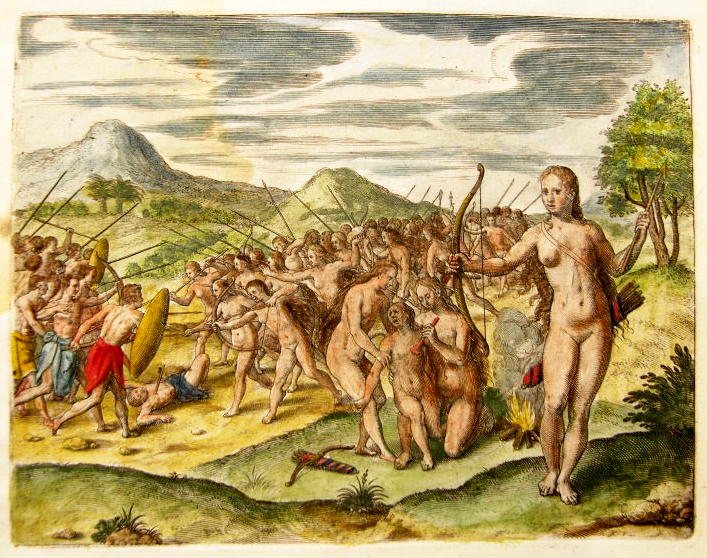
Women warriors of Monomotapa/ Mwenemutapa/ Mutapa Empire - Indiae Orientalis, 1599

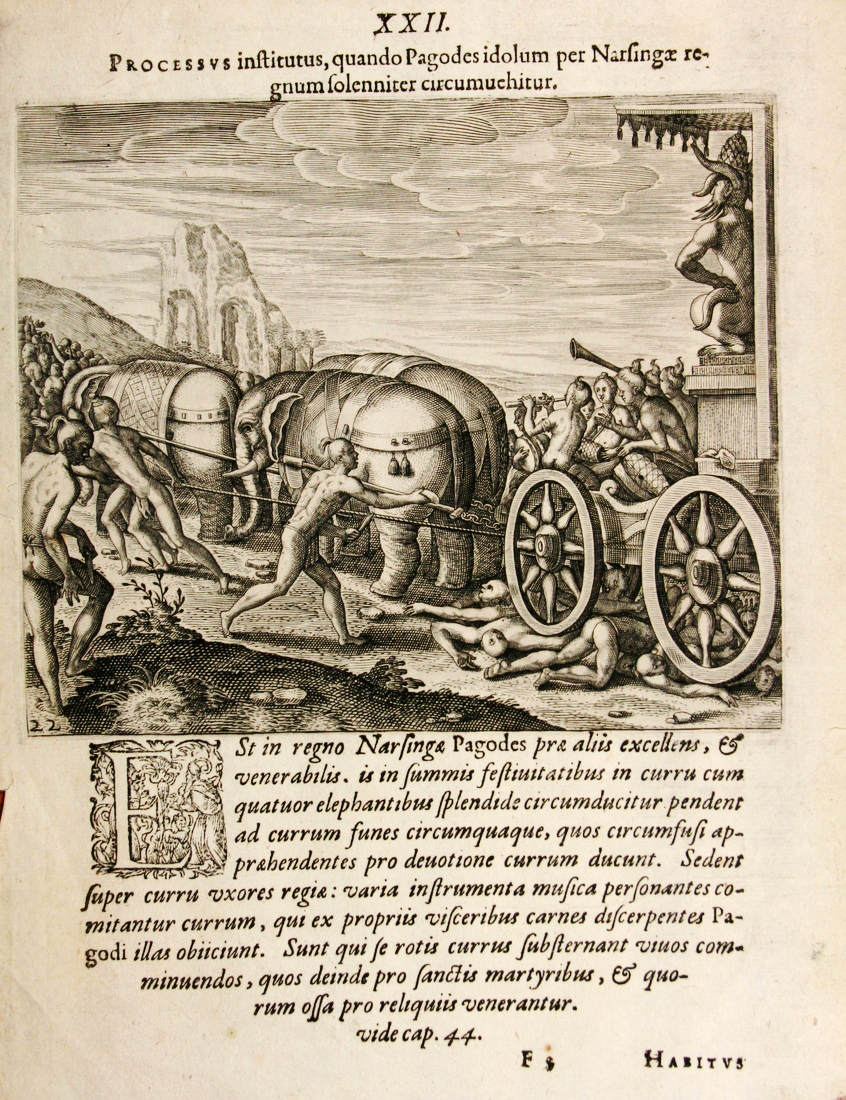
Procession of Idol in the kingdon of Narsingae - Indiae Orientalis, 1599

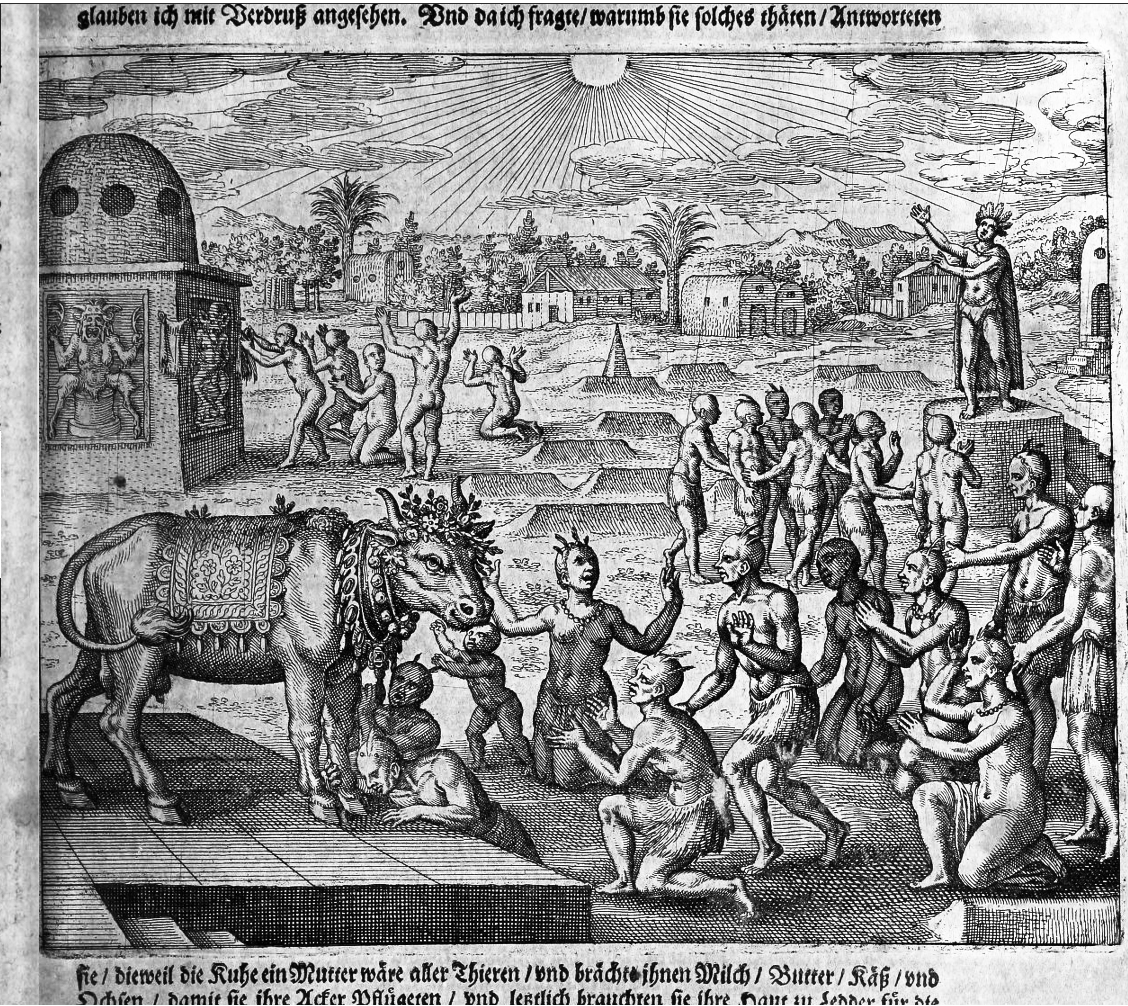
Indians venerating a cow - Indiae Orientalis, 1599

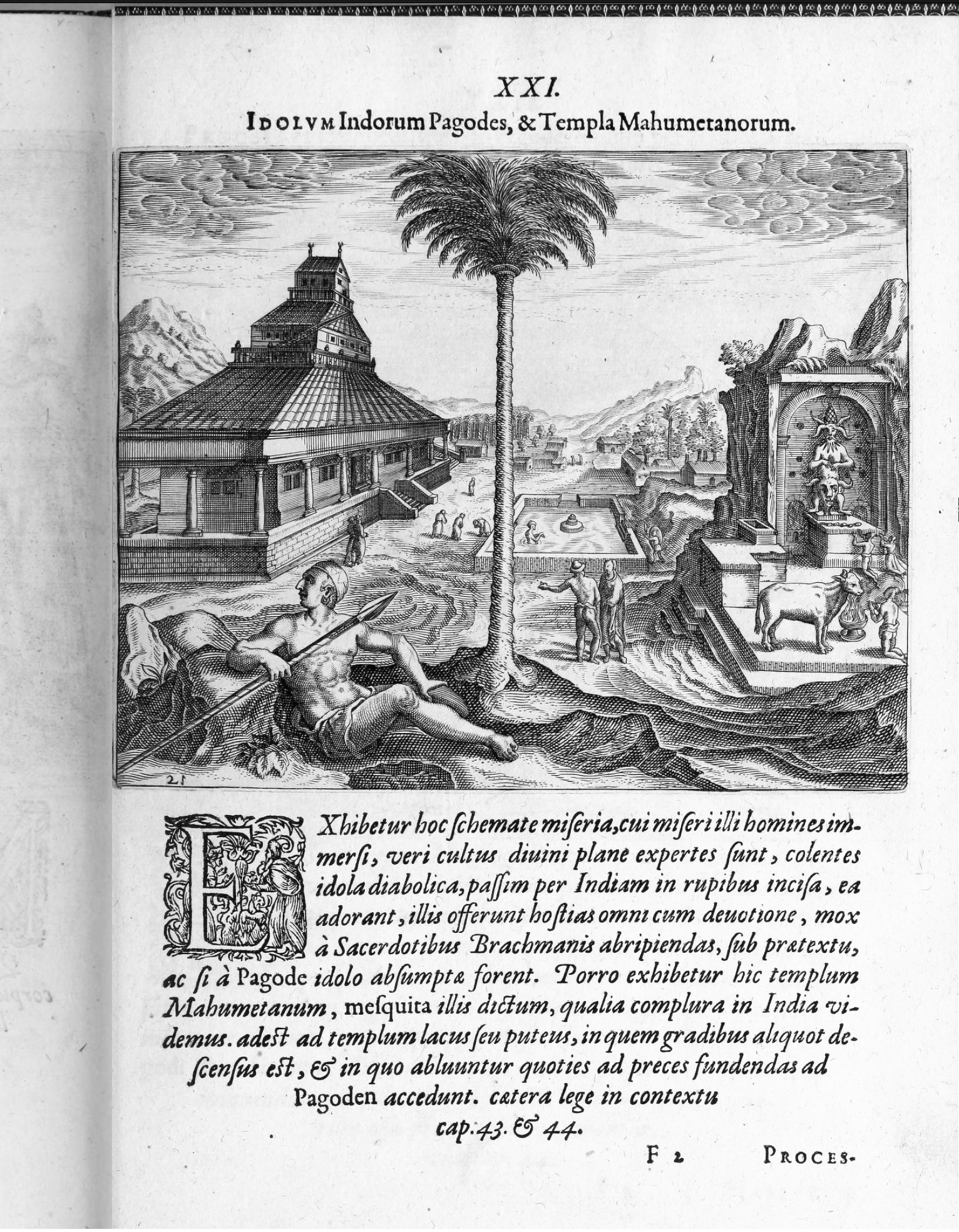
Mohammedan Temple and Indian Pagoda - Indiae Orientalis, 1599

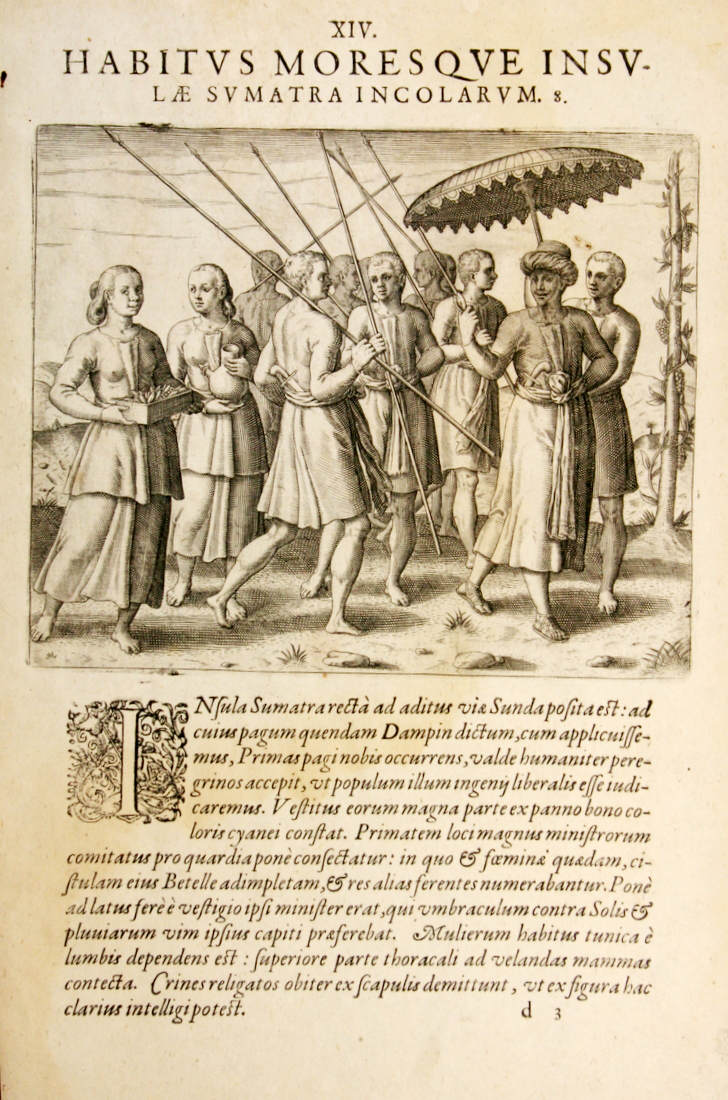
Clothing of the people of the island of Sumatra - Indiae Orientalis, 1599

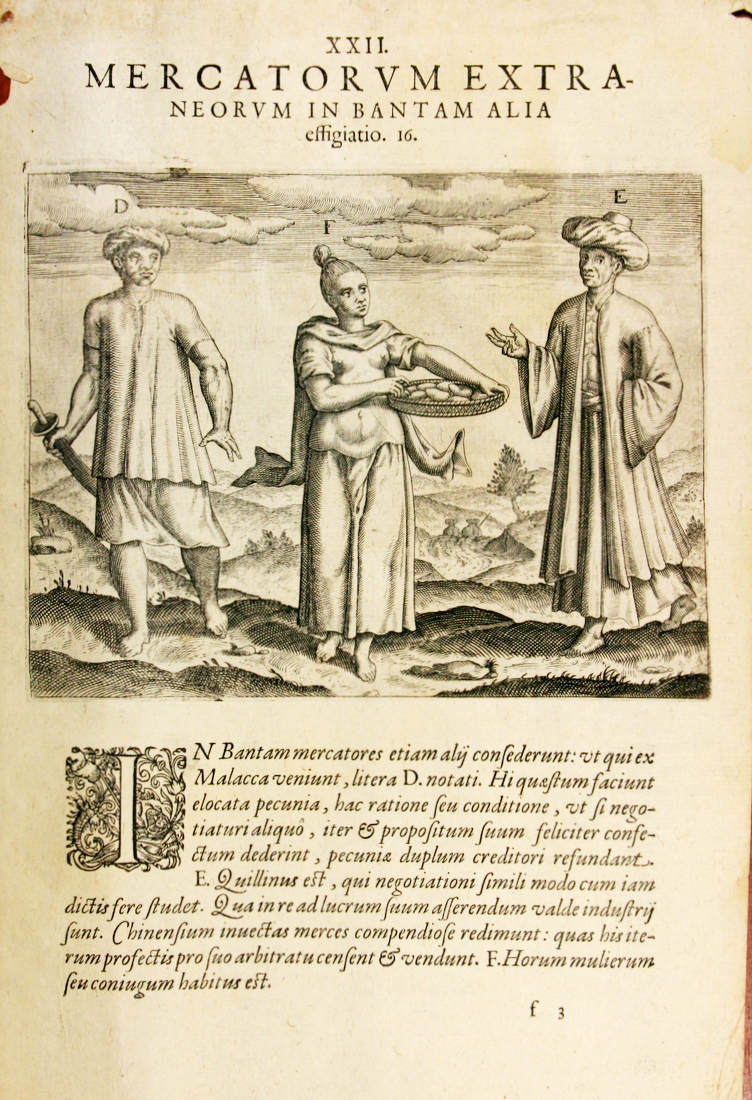
People of Malacca & Bantam - Indiae Orientalis, 1599

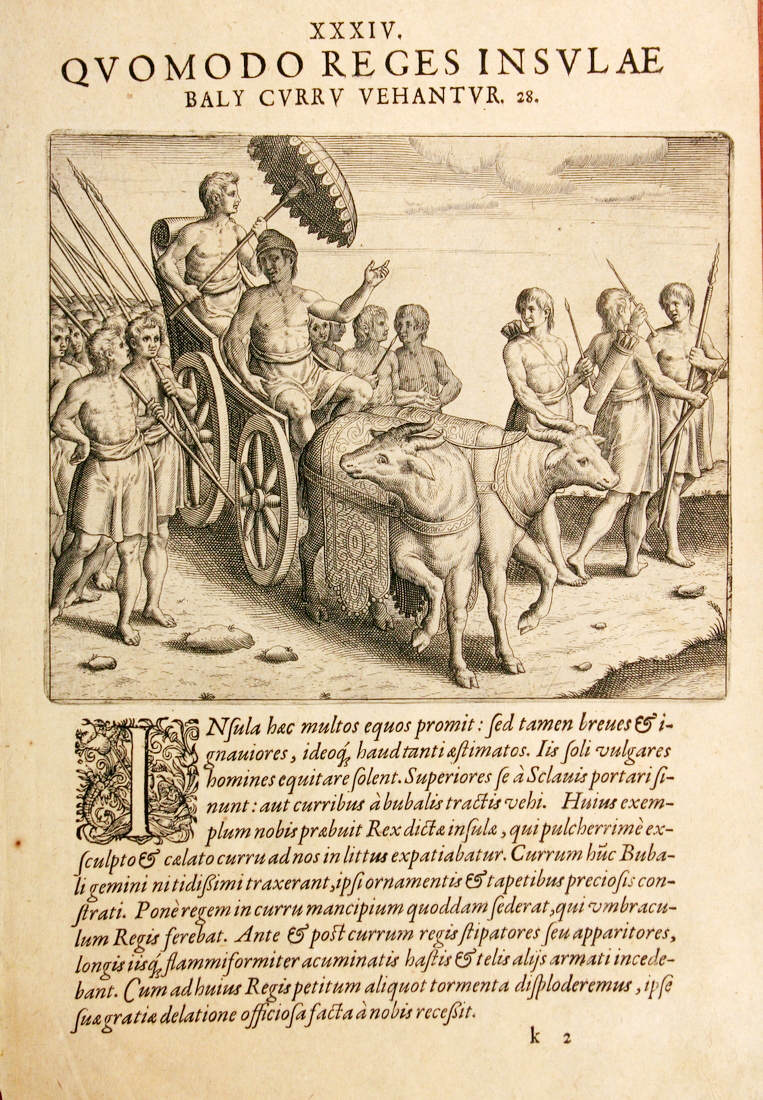
King of the island of Bali - Indiae Orientalis, 1599
