= Edward A. Reynolds West Side High School =

Public high school in New York City

- Former location on the Upper West Side of Manhattan, New York City

Edward A. Reynolds West Side High School is a New York City public alternative high school in East Harlem, formerly located on the Upper West Side of Manhattan. West Side High is a transfer school for students behind on credits and at risk of dropping out.
