= 45 East 66th Street =

Building in Manhattan, New York

- U.S. National Register of Historic Places
- U.S. Historic district – Contributing property
- New York State Register of Historic Places
- New York City Landmark
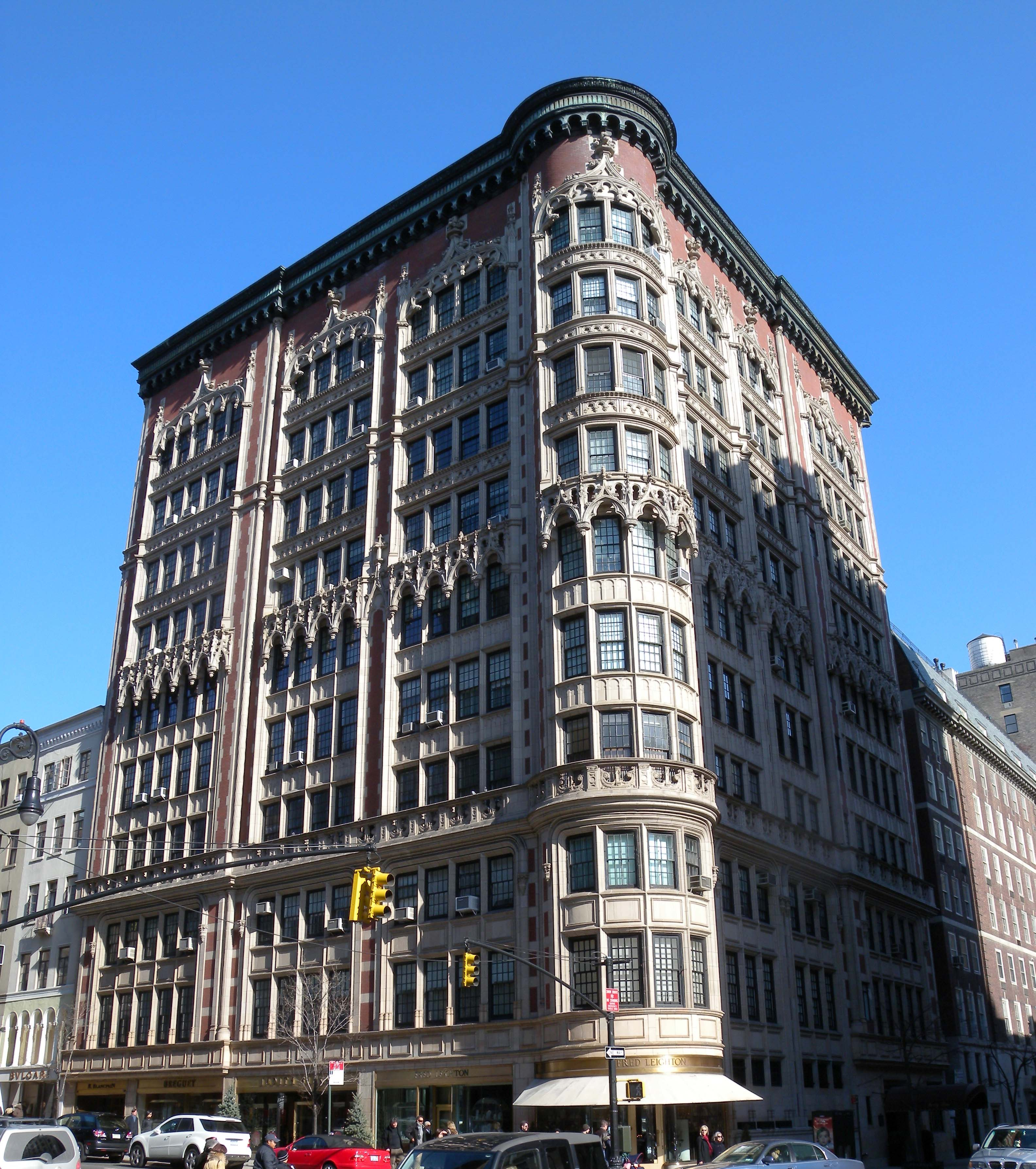
- Seen from across Madison Avenue and 66th Street (2009)

- Location within Manhattan Location within New York City Location within New York
- Location: 45 E. 66th St., Manhattan, New York, US
- Coordinates: 40°46′05″N 73°58′04″W
- Area: 10,042 ft^{2} (932.9 m^{2})
- Built: 1908
- Architect: Harde & Short
- Architectural style: French Gothic
- Part of: Upper East Side Historic District (ID84002803)
- NRHP reference No.: 80002674
- NYSRHP No.: 06101.000059
- NYCL No.: 0963

Significant dates
- Added to NRHP: May 6, 1980
- Designated NYSRHP: June 23, 1980
- Designated NYCL: November 15, 1977

45 East 66th Street (also known as 777 Madison Avenue) is a cooperative apartment building on the Upper East Side of Manhattan in New York City, United States. It was built between 1906 and 1908 and was designed by the firm of Harde & Short. The building is one of a few luxury apartment buildings that were developed in the surrounding area prior to World War I. It is a New York City designated landmark and is listed on the National Register of Historic Places.

The building, located at the northeast corner of Madison Avenue and 66th Street, is ten stories high. The facade is made of red brick with light-colored French Gothic–style terracotta details. The Madison Avenue and 66th Street facades are both divided vertically into three bays and are ornamented with details such as band courses, ogee arches, finials, crockets, and tracery. Over the years, architectural critics such as Paul Goldberger and Christopher Gray have praised the detailing on the facade. Initially, the building had 20 apartments, surrounding a light court at the center; the typical apartment included three to four bedrooms and several family rooms. The ground-story apartments were replaced with retail in 1929, and most of the apartments were subdivided in the late 1940s and early 1950s.

The building was developed by Parkview Real Estate Company, which was led by Charles F. Rogers. The structure was sold in 1912 after going into foreclosure, and it was resold twice more in the next decade. Bing & Bing owned the building from 1929 to 1973, when the racehorse owner Sigmund Sommer bought it. Sommer fired several employees and made other changes to the building, triggering rent strikes and lawsuits. Bing & Bing ultimately repurchased 45 East 66th Street in 1977 and resold it to Martin J. Raynes in 1985. Raynes converted the building into a housing cooperative, and the facade was renovated in the late 1980s. After Raynes ended his involvement with the building in 1990, Classic Properties took over the remaining unsold co-ops, and it sold the retail space. A penthouse structure atop the building was erected in the 2010s.

== Site ==
45 East 66th Street is on the northeastern corner of 66th Street and Madison Avenue on the Upper East Side of Manhattan in New York City, United States. The building has an alternate address of 777 Madison Avenue. The rectangular land lot covers 10,042 square feet (932.9 m^{2}), with a frontage of 100 feet (30 m) on 66th Street to the south and 100 feet (30 m) on Madison Avenue to the west. The building itself measures approximately 100 by 89 feet (30 by 27 m) across. Nearby structures include the Sara Delano Roosevelt Memorial House at 49 East 65th Street, on the block to the south, and the Seventh Regiment Armory between 66th and 67th streets, on the block to the east.

Prior to the current building's construction, the site at 777 Madison Avenue had been occupied by a four-story stone house and a brick-and-stone church. When the building was developed in the 1900s, the surrounding area was occupied by rowhouses. A small number of luxury apartments were built nearby before World War I, including the Verona two blocks south.

== Architecture ==
The building was designed by Harde & Short (Note: The building is sometimes incorrectly attributed to Stanford White.) and rises 10 stories. It contains decorative details inspired by the French Gothic style; the decorations are spread across the entire facade, unlike in other buildings built in New York City before World War I, where the decorations were typically confined to the bottom and top stories. The historian Christopher Gray described the decorations as similar to those of the Leuven Town Hall in Leuven, Belgium.

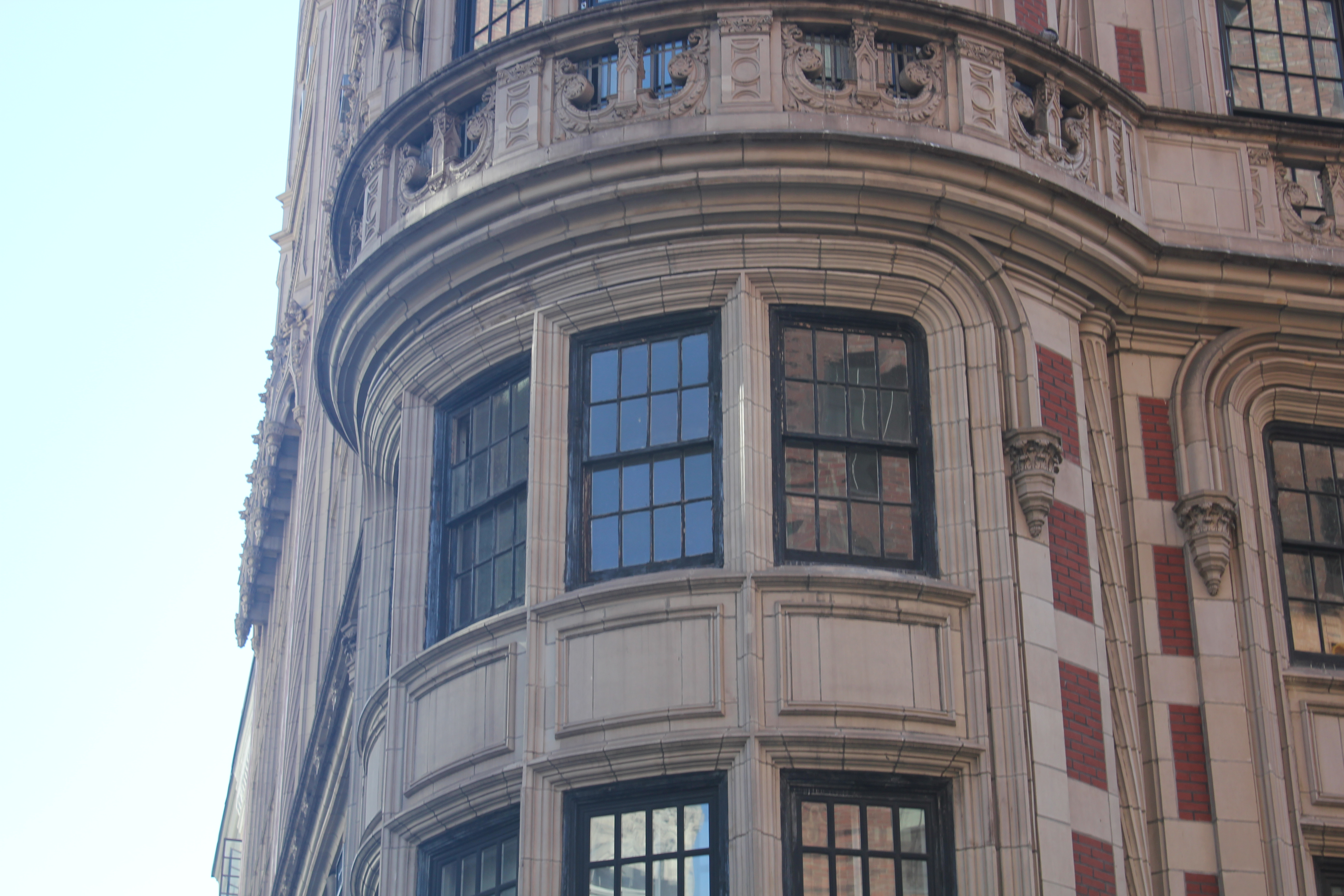
Rounded corner

The decorations at 45 East 66th Street resemble those of several other buildings designed by Harde & Short. Before designing 45 East 66th Street, Harde & Short had designed the Red House at 350 West 85th Street, which also included large amounts of Gothic decoration. The turret at the building's corner was adapted from another Harde & Short building at West End Avenue and 80th Street; the firm later used a similar rounded corner in the Alwyn Court. The building's decorations also influenced the design of 44 West 77th Street, which was built shortly afterward.

=== Facade ===
45 East 66th Street is mostly clad in red brick, with light-colored terracotta details, in addition to pieces of blackened mortar. The facade's two primary elevations—the western elevation on Madison Avenue and the southern elevation on 66th Street—are connected by a rounded turret at the corner. The turret rises the entire height of the building and curves 180 degrees counterclockwise from the northwest to the southeast. Each elevation is divided vertically into three bays. The northernmost bay on Madison Avenue and the easternmost bay on 66th Street protrude slightly from the facade, with twisting engaged columns on either side, and consist of five windows on each story. The other bays on both facades are narrower; the two western bays on 66th Street have three windows per story, while the two southern bays on Madison Avenue have four windows per story.

The building's main entrance is on 66th Street. The original entrance was through a stone doorway at the corner of Madison Avenue and 66th Street, surrounded by leaf motifs and flanked by canopied windows. Above both the first and second stories are horizontal band courses. At the second and third stories, the windows in each bay are surrounded by a round arch with a drip molding, and there are corbels on either side of each bay. All stories above the first floor contain sash windows in a twelve-over-twelve configuration, except for the third floor, which has eight-over-eight windows. On both elevations of the facade, there is a balustrade with scrollwork in front of the fourth-story windows.

On the fourth through tenth stories, there are pointed ribs and terracotta key patterns on both sides of each bay. In addition, the windows above the fourth and fifth stories have terracotta spandrels with arch decorations. A Gothic canopy with ogee arches, finials, crockets, and tracery is located above each of the sixth-story windows. The canopies above the narrower bays are connected by trefoil arches with finials. At the seventh through ninth stories, the spandrels above each window consist of arches and corbels. Within each bay, there is an ogee arch above the tenth-story windows, which is decorated with tracery. Above the tenth story is a cornice with arches and vertical grooves, which resemble a partial colonnade. Above the cornice was originally a double-height parapet, which was removed in the 20th century due to extreme deterioration. The top of the roof was originally 18 feet (5.5 m) higher than the top of the facade. A penthouse is placed above the roof.

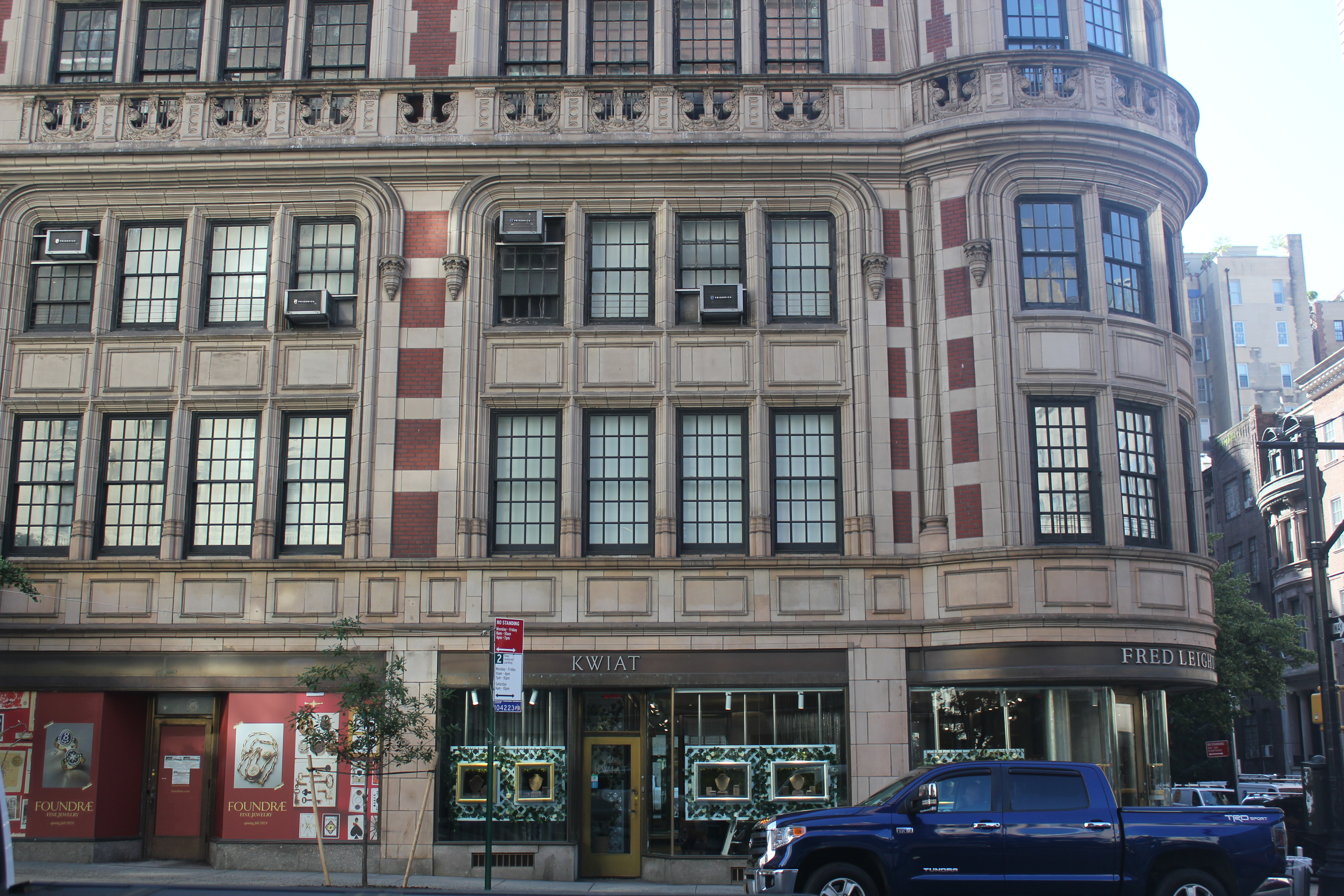
First through third stories

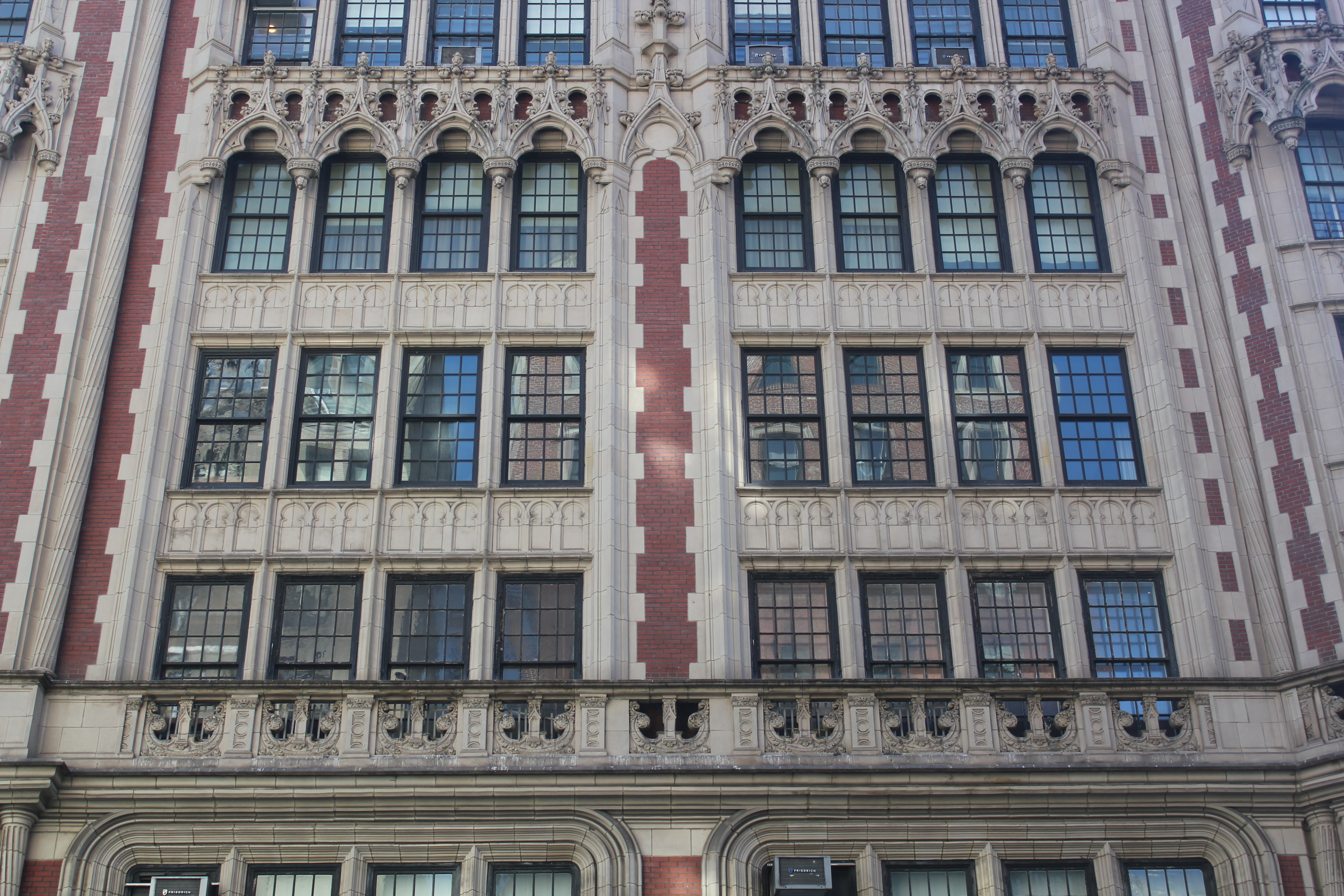
Fourth through sixth stories

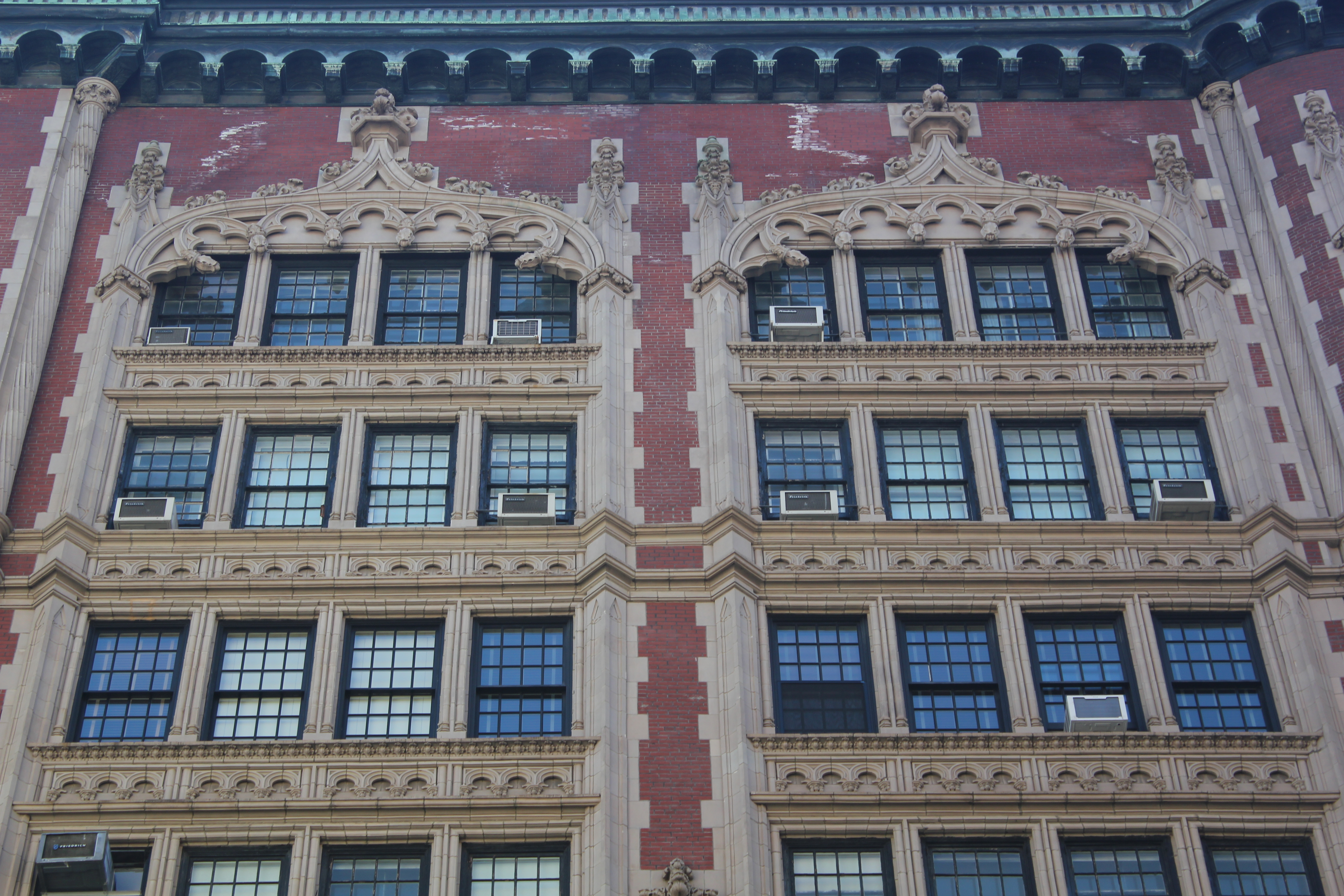
Seventh through tenth stories

=== Features ===
According to the New York City Department of City Planning, the building has a gross floor area of 86,910 square feet (8,074 m^{2}). The original plans for the building called for 41 apartments decorated with hardwood, mosaic, and marble tile. The structure would be outfitted with steam heating and electric elevators. However, the building initially had 20 apartments, with two on each floor. The typical apartment had several family rooms, including a foyer, music room, living room, dining room, and salon, which covered a total of 1,600 square feet (150 m^{2}). In addition, each of the apartments had four bathrooms and three to four regular bedrooms, along with some smaller bedrooms for the live-in staff. The apartments had about 12 or 13 rooms apiece, and many were ornamented with elaborate woodwork. Similarly to the later Alwyn Court, the apartments surrounded a light court at the center.

The ground-story apartments were replaced with commercial storefronts as part of a 1929 renovation; the original entrance was moved from the curved corner to 66th Street at that time. Many of the remaining apartments were divided in the late 1940s and early 1950s, increasing the number of apartments to 34. By the late 20th century, some of the apartments on the intermediate floors remained intact, but only the tenth floor retained its original layout. After the building was converted to a housing cooperative, the upper stories have included 33 apartments, while the lower stories have contained several storefronts and offices. The Department of City Planning cites the building as being split into 33 apartments and three non-residential units. At the beginning of the 21st century, the building had about 5,200 square feet (480 m^{2}) of retail space.

== History ==
=== Development and early years ===
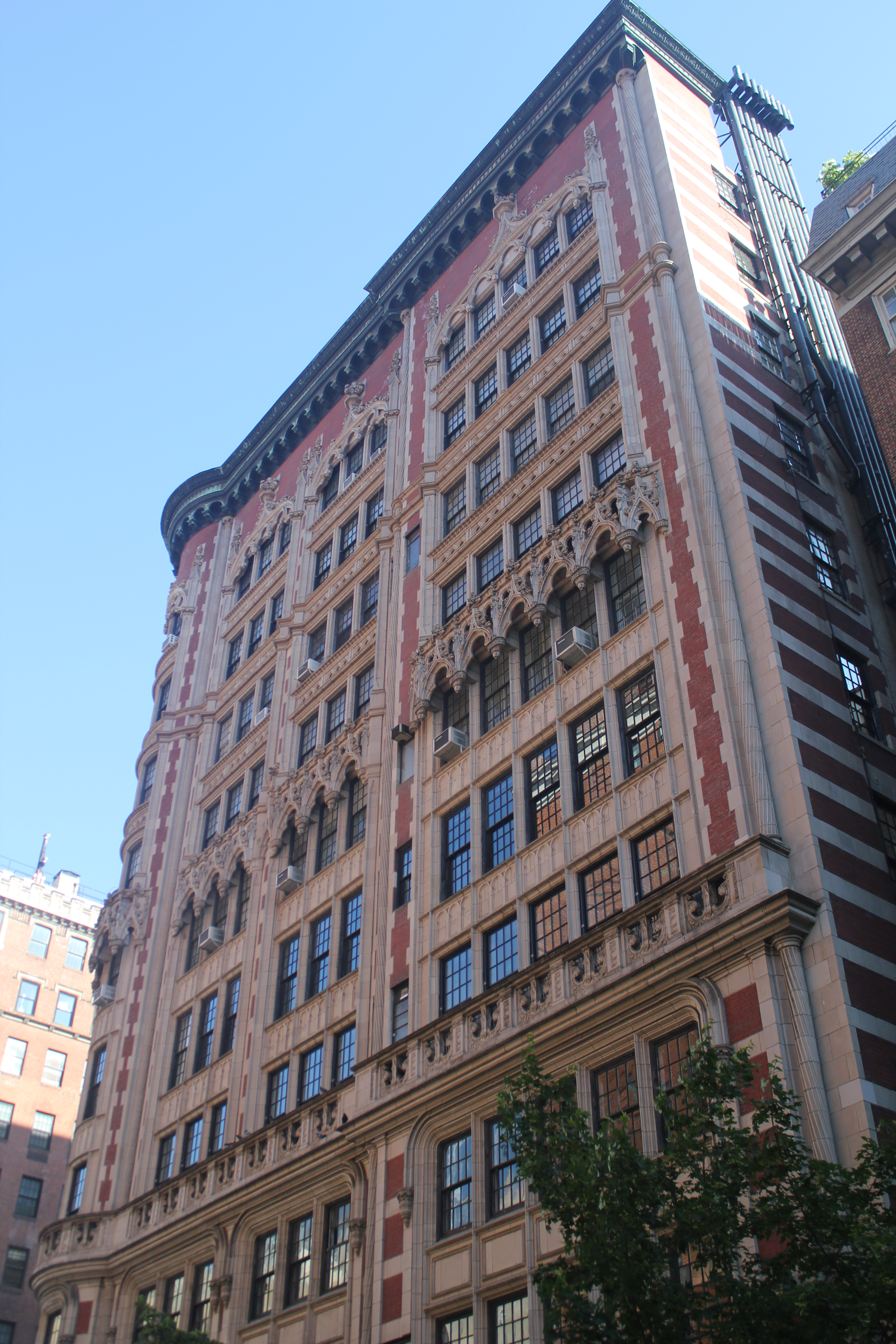
The building viewed from 66th Street

The building was developed by Parkview Real Estate Company, which was led by Charles F. Rogers. In early 1906, the firm of Schwartz & Gross was hired to design an 11-story apartment building at Madison Avenue and 66th Street, which was expected to cost $400,000. Parkview Real Estate hired Harde and Short that May to design an apartment building on the site. The next month, Harde and Short submitted plans for a ten-story apartment building on the site, which was to cost $1 million, to the New York City Department of Buildings. The Century Investing Company lent Parkview Real Estate $315,000 to pay for the building's construction. The structure was initially called the Parkview, (Note: Also spelled Park View) a tribute to the fact that Central Park was one block west.

777 Madison Avenue was completed in 1908, and the Empire Trust Company lent Parkview Real Estate $115,000 for the property that year. Originally, the building's valuation was assessed at $1 million. In spite of the recent Panic of 1907, many of the building's apartments had been rented out shortly after its completion. Among the building's early residents was the socialite Micaela de Acosta, whose daughter Aida de Acosta was married there in 1908. Other tenants included the socialite Helen Phelps Stokes, as well as the businessman Anson Wood Burchard. In 1910, Albert J. Bodker was hired to add some bathrooms. The structure soon went into foreclosure, and it was auctioned off in May 1912. The Barney Estate Company took over the building. The new owners obtained a $500,000 mortgage from the Title Insurance Company and a $500,000 mortgage from United States Realty. 777 Madison Avenue was resold in 1919 to I. Randolph Jacobs and Everett Jacobs; at the time, the building was valued at $800,000.

By the early 1920s, the building's tenants paid $130,000 per year in rent. The Jacobses resold the building in November 1921 to Max Loewenthal, and they acquired Loewenthal's 22-room country estate in North Castle, New York, in exchange. The building had originally been surrounded by a recessed areaway, but this was infilled in the early 20th century as Madison Avenue became more commercial in character. By the 1920s, the building's residents included the businessman Harry F. Guggenheim, former police chief Theodore A. Bingham, the novelist Cosmo Hamilton, and the businessman William Delavan Baldwin.

=== Bing and Bing ownership ===
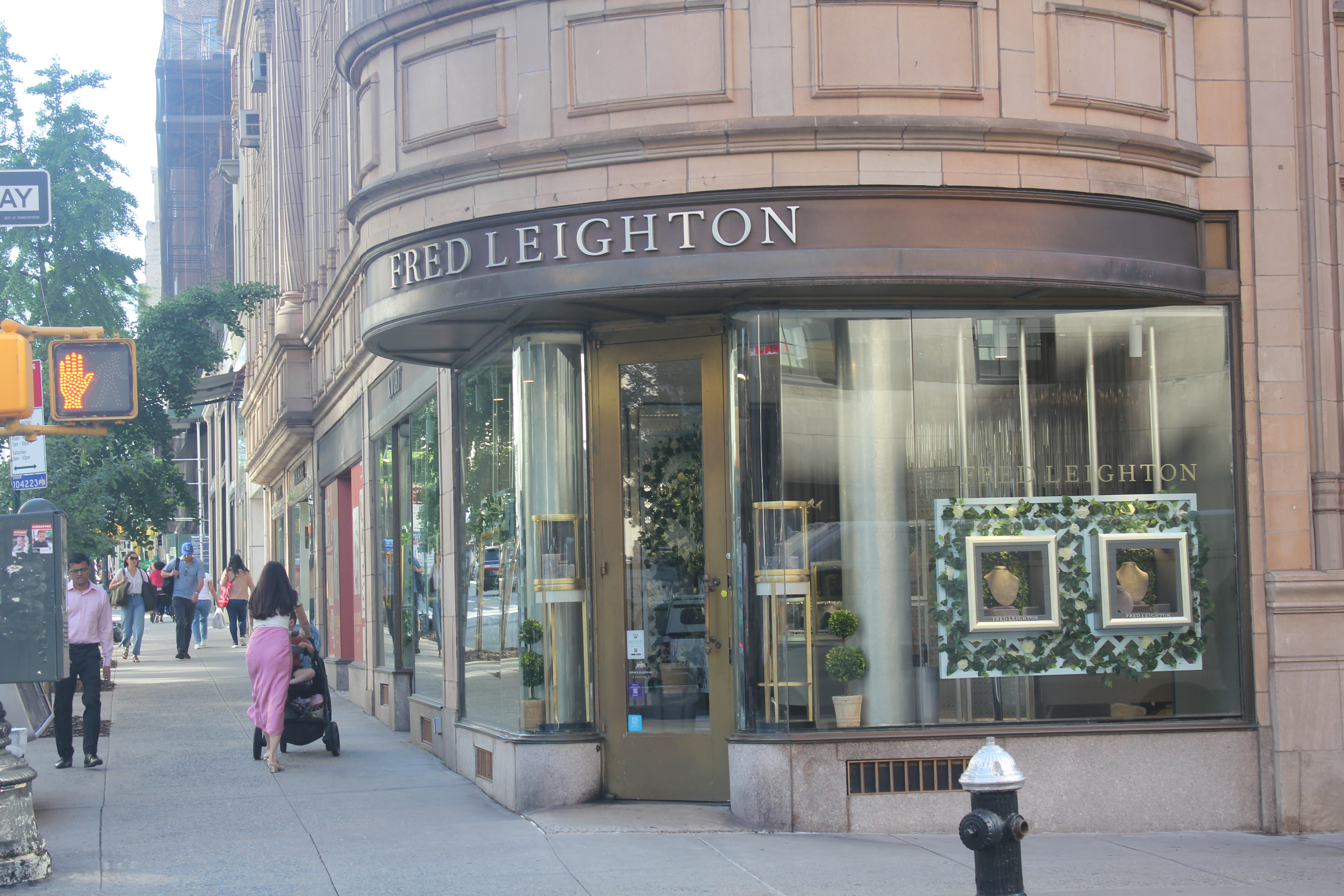
The original main entrance, now a storefront

Gresham Realty, led by the real-estate investor Alexander Bing, bought 777 Madison Avenue in February 1928. At this point, the structure was valued at $1.5 million. Bing's firm, later known as Bing & Bing, owned the building for the next 45 years. Due to increasing demand for commercial space, the ground-story spaces were converted to storefronts in 1929 and the entrance moved to 45 East 66th Street. After the commercial space was finished, the Scottish-goods importer MacDougalls of Inverness leased a storefront at the building. The antiques dealer Walter Philipp leased a storefront in 1938. Among the building's residents in the mid-20th century were the singer Morton Downey, the politician Grafton D. Cushing, and the socialite Nelly Régine Beer (the wife of banking magnate Robert de Rothschild).

Most of the apartments remained intact during the Great Depression, but rental income decreased due to temporary rent regulation restrictions imposed during World War II. As such, from 1948 to 1953, the owners subdivided most of the upper-story apartments as older tenants moved out. During the mid-1950s, many of the decorations on the sixth and tenth floors were removed. The Sagittarius Gallery moved to 45 East 66th Street in 1958, and the retailer Henry Greenhut moved into the building the next year. In addition, Betty Metcalf opened a dress shop there in 1963.

=== Sommer ownership and Bing repurchase ===
The racehorse owner Sigmund Sommer bought 45 East 66th Street in July 1973; at the time, the building's residents included United Nations ambassadors and theatrical personalities, who paid up to $2,500 a month. After taking over, Sommer allegedly fired three employees, including a doorman and an elevator operator. He converted the original manually operated elevator to automatic operation. Sommer also changed the lightbulbs from antique ones to cheaper neon tubes, a move protested by several tenants. The dissenting tenants claimed that the building was being neglected and that the employees' dismissals made the building less safe, though Sommer claimed that he had lost over $33,000 in one fiscal year. The tenants filed suit to prevent Sommer from dismissing the staff, and they also went on a rent strike, withholding thousands of dollars until the staff were reinstated. Several of the building's residents went to the Belmont Park horse track to protest Sommer. The protesting tenants bet on Sommer's horse, in the hope that they would win $100,000 to hire the elevator operator, although they lost their money. Sommer agreed to employ a doorman 24 hours a day.

In late 1974, the state's conciliation and appeals board fined Sommer $2,500 for dismissing the elevator operator. Even though the elevator had just been automated, the board ordered Sommer in late 1974 to hire an elevator operator. Sommer appealed the decision, forcing the tenants to operate the elevator themselves; twenty tenants went on a rent strike while the decision was appealed. The New York Supreme Court ruled in early 1975 that the elevator operator had to be hired, although the $2,500 fine was waived. That November, New York's landlords and tenants court ruled that, because the building had lacked an elevator operator for 11 months, Sommer had to refund tenants 10% of the rent payments made during that time. The New York Supreme Court, Appellate Division, upheld the Supreme Court ruling in 1976, mandating that an elevator operator be hired.

Bing and Bing bought back the building in 1977. Afterward, the tenants sought to have the building designated as a city landmark, and they commissioned Christopher Gray to write a report about 45 East 66th Street. The owners, who opposed the designation, hired the architect Percival Goodman, who claimed that the preservation movement "will be cheapened by dubious designations". Conversely, the Municipal Art Society, the American Institute of Architects' local chapter, the Society of Architectural Historians, and several individual architects supported landmark protection. The New York City Landmarks Preservation Commission (LPC) considered designating 45 East 66th Street as a city landmark in May 1977, and the commission granted the designation on November 15, 1977. The building was added to the National Register of Historic Places in 1980. By the early 1980s, the building's retail tenants included the shoe store Botticellino and the jeweler Fred Leighton. In addition, the building had an Italian shoe boutique, Flaminia Shoes.

=== Co-op conversion ===
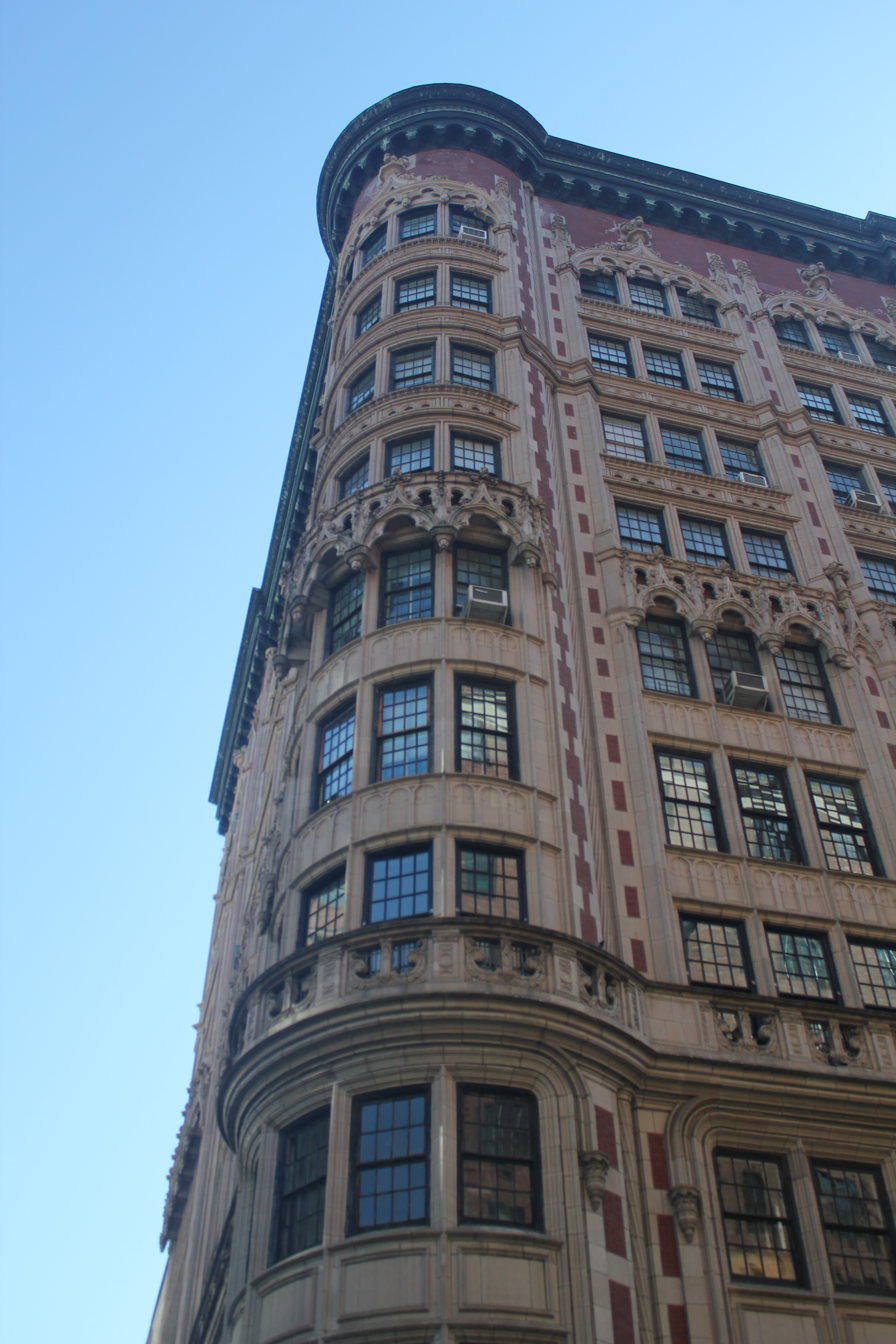
Architectural detail of the building's curved corner at Madison Avenue and 66th Street, as seen from the ground

In 1985, the developer Martin J. Raynes agreed to buy 45 East 66th Street and several other properties from Bing and Bing, with plans to convert the structures into condominiums or cooperatives. Raynes began converting 45 East 66th Street into cooperative apartments. The cooperative apartments on the upper floors constituted a single condominium for ownership purposes, while the retail space and two professional offices downstairs were split into three different ownership condominiums. Several retailers opened stores at the building in 1987, including the clothing retailer Alexon Group, the clothing retailer David Berk, and the jeweler Matthew Hoffman. This was followed in 1988 by the opening of Christian de Castelnau's clothing boutique, which operated in the building for only two years. The co-op conversion took effect in September 1988. As part of the co-op agreement, workers were not allowed to renovate the building during the summer.

After the co-op conversion went into effect, the engineer Vincent Stramandinoli supervised a restoration of the facade, while Hydro Kleen was hired to clean the facade. Raynes ended his involvement with the co-op conversion in 1990. Classic Properties took over the remaining unsold apartments, while the Executive Life Insurance Company became a limited partner in the conversion. The next year, Mitsui Real Estate Sales bought the building's ground-level retail space from Raines for $14.75 million, or $2,854.65 per square foot ($30,727.2/m^{2}). La Perla opened a clothing boutique at 777 Madison Avenue in 1994. Twelve of the building's apartments were still rental units by then, even as the remaining tenants had bought into the co-op offering plan. The building gained more retail tenants in the late 1990s, including the luxury label Goldpfeil and the Italian shoe boutique Pancaldi.

Friedland Properties bought the retail space for $22.55 million in 2001; it was estimated to be the most costly commercial-real-estate transaction in New York City. At the time, the building's retail tenants included a Charles Jourdan shoe store, as well as David Berk, La Perla, and Fred Leighton. The same year, part of the ground-floor interior was renovated to accommodate an expansion of the Fred Leighton store. A Judith Ripka jewelry boutique opened at the building in 2005. The LPC approved plans for a penthouse structure atop the building in 2014, with a bedroom, bathrooms, and dressing rooms. Former New York City mayor Rudy Giuliani, who owned a penthouse unit on the top floor until 2025, reportedly opposed the penthouse's construction because he did not want his apartment to lose its status as the building's penthouse. The penthouse was ultimately built anyway. The diamond company De Beers operated a temporary store at 777 Madison Avenue during the late 2010s. The building continued to operate as a co-op, with a doorman, into the 2020s.

== Reception ==
When the building was being considered for landmark designation in 1977, the historian Paul Goldberger said the "eccentricity of its lavish detailing and round tower strikes just the right note on bustling Madison Avenue" because the decorations redirected observers' attention upward. In another news article three years later, Goldberger felt that the building was "just elaborate enough to be showy, just restrained enough to be dignified". In a 1992 book about apartment buildings in New York City, Andrew Alpern wrote that the facade's decorations "show an intricate complexity of surface treatment and a flamboyance that has few equals in all the city". Christopher Gray, writing for The New York Times in 1988, called the structure a "high-water mark in early apartment styling", as buildings erected in the city after World War I were generally designed in a more conservative style. Not all commentary was positive; Goodman felt that the building had a mediocre design and that its architects had had little influence.

== See also ==
- List of New York City Designated Landmarks in Manhattan from 59th to 110th Streets
- National Register of Historic Places listings in Manhattan from 59th to 110th Streets
