= 44 West 77th Street =

Apartment building in Manhattan, New York

- Studio Apartments
- U.S. National Register of Historic Places
- New York State Register of Historic Places
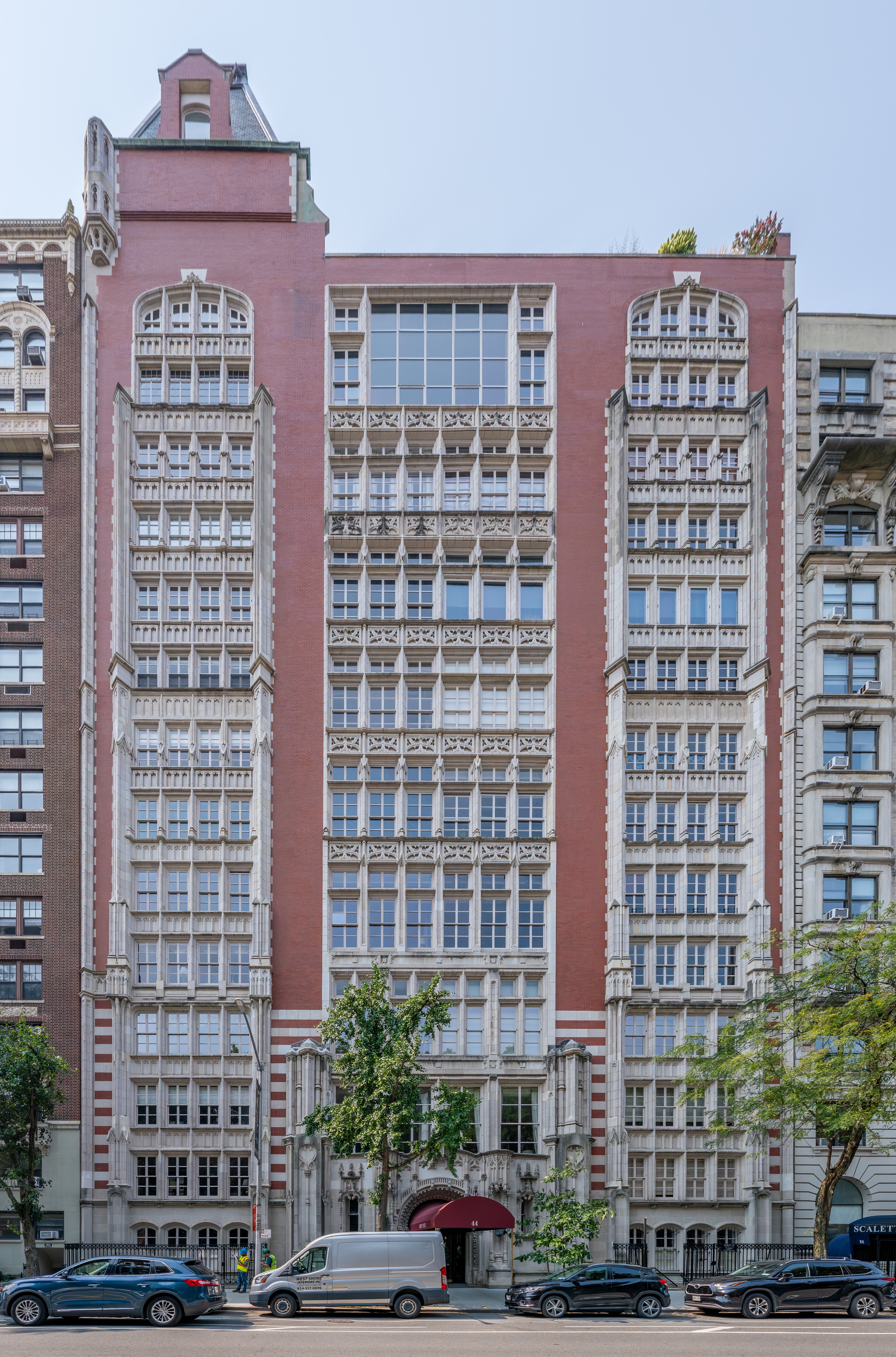

- Location within Manhattan Location within New York City Location within New York Location within the United States
- Location: 44 W. 77th St., New York, New York
- Coordinates: 40°46′48″N 73°58′33″W
- Area: 10,200 square feet (950 m^{2})
- Built: 1907
- Architect: Harde & Short
- Architectural style: Late Gothic Revival
- NRHP reference No.: 83001748
- NYSRHP No.: 06101.000177

Significant dates
- Added to NRHP: 1983-05-19
- Designated NYSRHP: 1983-04-01

44 West 77th Street (also known as the Studio Building or Studio Apartments) is a 14-story housing cooperative on the Upper West Side of Manhattan in New York City, United States. It was designed by Harde & Short in the Neo-Gothic style and was completed in 1909. The apartment building has a brick facade and limestone trim, with elaborate arched doorway. The facade has three protruding bays of large, north-facing windows, intended in part to illuminate artists' studios inside. Above the ground-floor lobby, the building has a mixture of large apartments for general use and smaller artists' apartments with 1 1/2-story studio rooms.

The building's developer, the artist Walter Russell, had previously built similar structures in the West 67th Street Artists' Colony. Russell acquired the site in 1907 and completed it two years later. He then sold the building to the Manhattan Square Apartment Association, whose shareholders owned the building, making it a housing cooperative. The building stopped being a cooperative in the 1940s, when the Metropolitan Life Insurance Company acquired 44 West 77th Street and removed the terracotta decorations. After being sold several times, the building was reconverted to cooperative ownership in 1970, and the facade was restored in the 1990s. The building is listed on the National Register of Historic Places and is a contributing property to the New York City Landmarks Preservation Commission's Central Park West-76th Street Historic District.

== Description ==
44 West 77th Street is located on the Upper West Side of Manhattan in New York City, United States. It is on the south side of the street just east of Columbus Avenue, occupying a rectangular land lot of 100 by 102 feet (30 by 31 m). 44 West 77th Street faces the American Museum of Natural History to the north. The site's location on the south side of 77th Street allowed the building to take advantage of sunlight from the north. The structure is sometimes known as the Studio Building or Studio Apartments. However, the historian Christopher Gray characterizes 44 West 77th Street as having no official name, describing it one of several such upscale early-20th-century buildings in Upper Manhattan, in contrast to older, named buildings such as the Dakota.

The building was designed by Harde & Short and was built by the Hedden Construction Company. 44 West 77th Street, along with 45 East 66th Street and the Alwyn Court, was one of three elaborately-decorated structures in Manhattan that Harde & Short had designed in the 1900s after completing the Red House in 1903.

=== Exterior ===
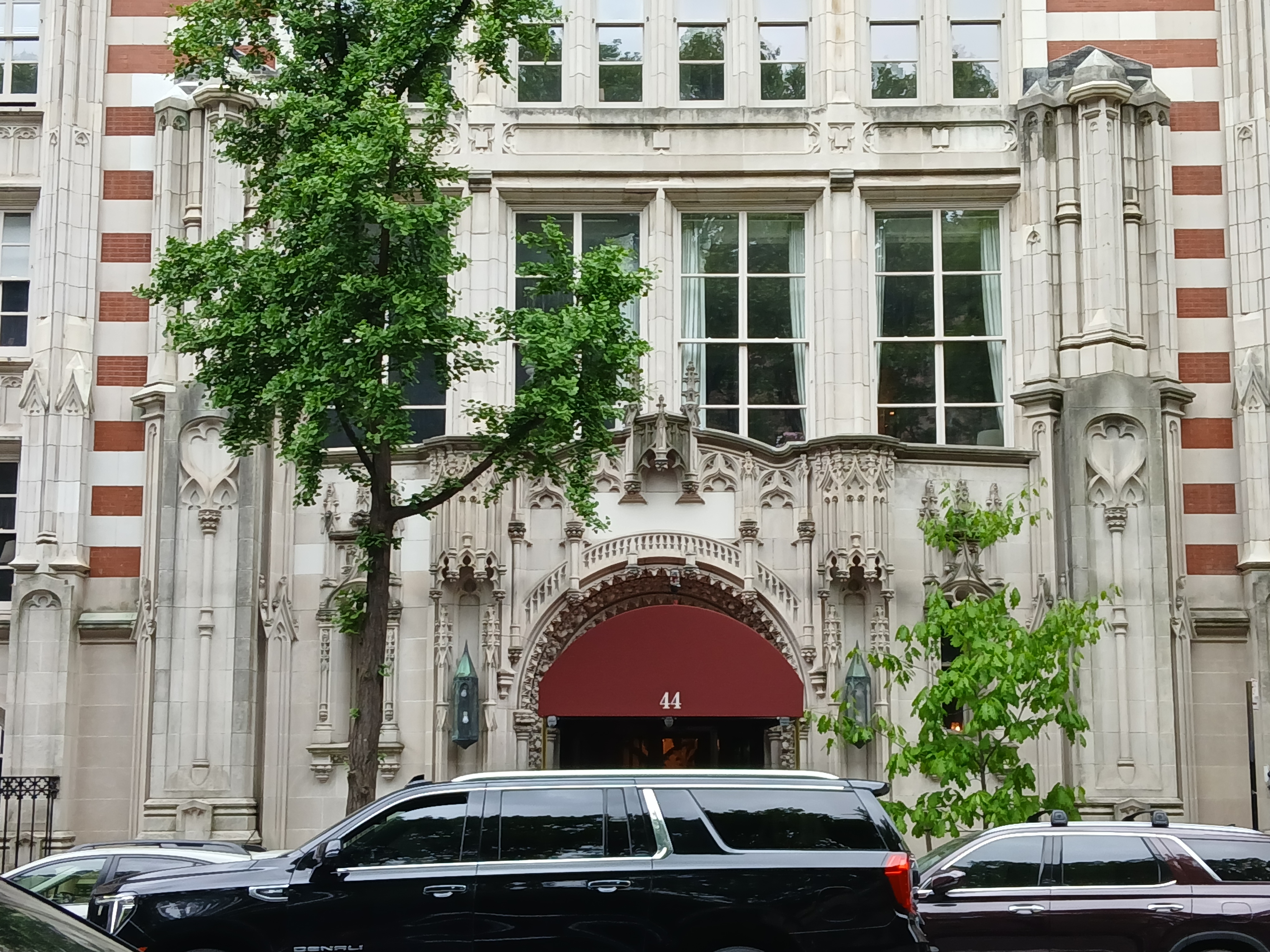
Decorations at the entrance of 44 West 77th Street

The facade was inspired by French churches and Belgian government buildings. The facade is mostly made of red brick. interspersed with limestone trim and divided vertically by three protruding bays of windows. The original decorations include extensive tracery, arches, finials, trefoil or quatrefoil motifs, and crockets. The facade also used white terracotta for decorations above the ground story, though most of the terracotta has since been removed.

On the ground floor is an elaborate arched doorway; the recessed windows on either side have protruding hoods. The doorway and windows are flanked by stepped buttresses, which ascend three stories. Within the protruding bays, there are carved spandrel panels between each floor. Some of the windows are double-height units, which illuminate artists' studios. The outer two bays are flanked by ribs, which ascend to the 12th floor. The decorations at the roofline included a turret, crockets, and a pediment, all in the Gothic style; these decorations were dismantled in the 1940s. As built, the western (right) bay had a tower topped by tracery, while the eastern (left) bay terminated abruptly. The eastern bay has a dormer at the rooftop, housed within a steep roof.

=== Interior ===
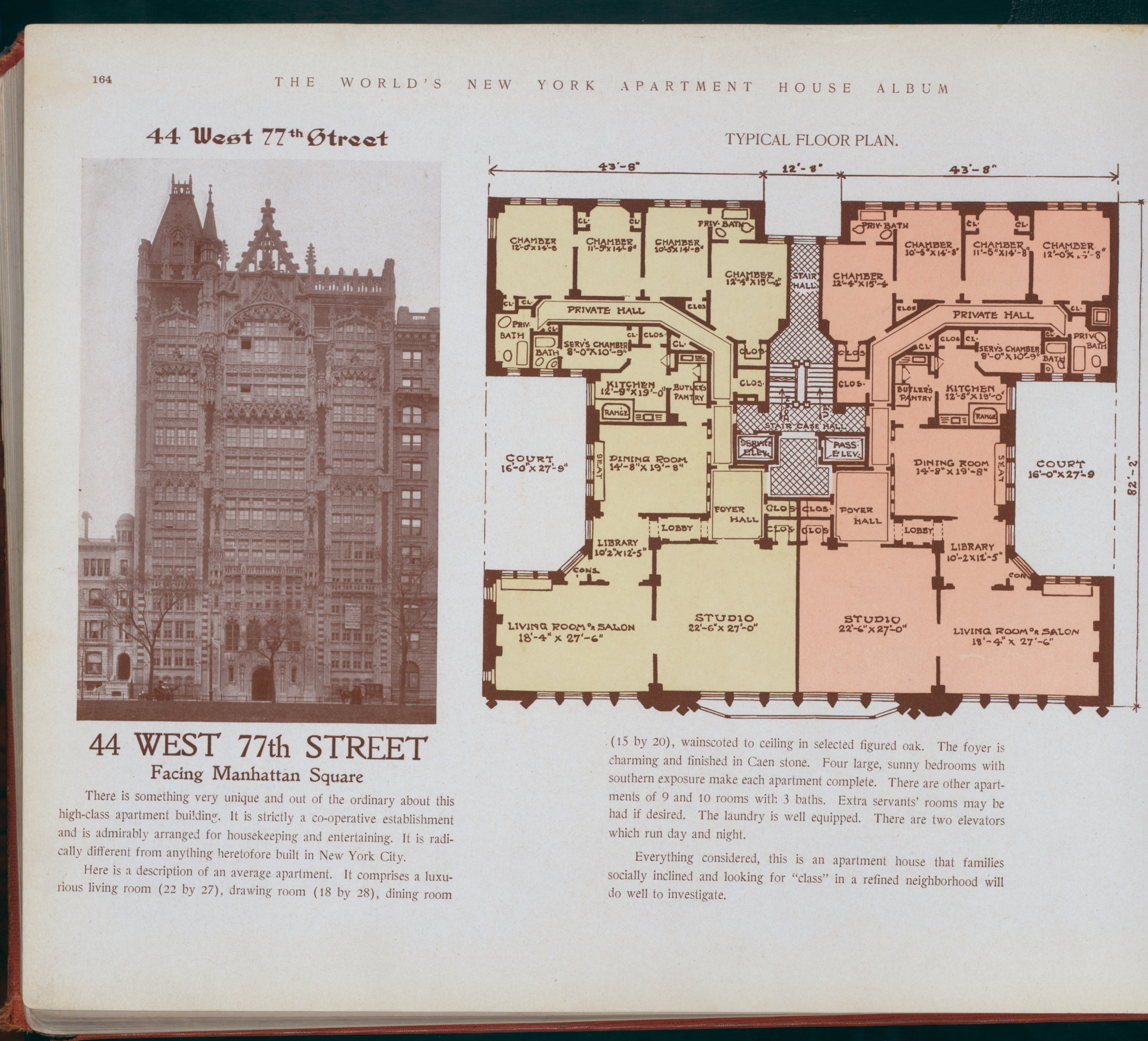
Interior floor plan

The interior floor plan remains mostly intact and, uniquely among Harde & Short's buildings, still retains its original entrance vestibule. The first floor has a lobby with gray walls, bronze chandeliers with finials, and gilded stair rails and doors. The lobby has engaged columns on the wall, which support a ceiling with groin vaults, similar to those in a cathedral. The vaults divide the lobby into three bays. The lobby also has elaborate limestone-framed, round-arched openings, some of which lead to other rooms. Above the interior doorways are transom windows, which have tracery.

As built, 44 West 77th Street included a mixture of large apartments for general use, along with smaller artists' apartments with 1 1/2-story studio rooms. Most of the large apartments remain and are grouped two to a floor; these apartments occupy the western or eastern halves of each floor. Artists' apartments are arranged in pairs, which span groupings of three stories; the 1 1/2-story studios of each pair are stacked atop each other. The lower apartment in each grouping is accessed from the lowest story, with the studio at the same level, while the upper apartment is accessed from the highest story, with the studio half a story below. The central portion of each grouping also has a separate apartment without any studio. One of the 13th-floor units, built for the sculptor Karl Bitter, measures 44 feet (13 m) long with a double-height ceiling. Another unit, renovated in 1939 for the artist Paul Trebilcock, had a living room 45 feet (14 m) long.

The apartments were generally designed by their original tenants, who were allowed to select decorations "within certain limitation". Excluding the foyers, kitchen, and servant rooms, large apartments typically have seven or eight rooms. Each of the apartments has a foyer, living room, dining room, sunroom, double-height studio, and multiple bedrooms. The living room or salon is typically placed at the front, the dining room in the center (facing an interior light court), and the bedrooms at the rear. The layouts of several apartments have been modified; for example, some apartments have received new closets, while rooms in other apartments were combined. A few apartments remain fully intact, including 6E, a nine-room unit with a Caen stone mantel, leaded-glass windows, bronze doorways, and carved wood pilasters.

== History ==
44 West 77th Street was developed in the 1900s by the artist Walter Russell under the 44 West Seventy-seventh Street Company. At the time, numerous developers were constructing housing cooperatives for artists in Manhattan, many of which contained large studio rooms with high ceilings. Russell had previously constructed some buildings in the West 67th Street Artists' Colony, another group of artists' studio apartments, and several developers of buildings in the 67th Street colony had begun constructing co-ops elsewhere in Manhattan. In January 1907, Russell bought four land lots on the south side of 77th Street east of Columbus Avenue totaling 102 by 100 feet (31 by 30 m) across. The lots, which included the 12-story Manhattan Square Hotel, would be replaced by the new studio apartment building. The developer borrowed $500,000 from the Metropolitan Life Insurance Company to help pay for the construction. Russell commissioned Harde & Short to design the building, and work began early that year.

44 West 77th Street was completed in 1909, and Pease & Elliman were hired to sell the apartments. Soon after the building's completion, in November 1909, the 44 West Seventy-seventh Street Company sold the property for slightly under $1,000,000 to the Manhattan Square Apartment Association. The association's shareholders owned the building, thus making it a housing cooperative. Although 44 West 77th Street was intended to be similar to earlier artists' cooperatives, it was home to a variety of professionals, such as doctors and lawyers. Some decorations on the facade had begun to peel off within two years of the building's completion, including terracotta shards that dropped onto the street, requiring the replacement of the mortar in the facade's joints. Much of the original terracotta work was replaced at that time with newer terracotta.

The building was taken over by the Metropolitan Life Insurance Company in 1940, following a foreclosure proceeding, and became a regular apartment building. Later in the decade, the terracotta decorations were dismantled due to concerns that the decorations would fall off. The terracotta was replaced with brick. The removal, overseen by Metropolitan Life's in-house architect Samuel R. Bishop, contrasted with the retention of similar details on Harde & Short's other buildings. Metropolitan Life sold the building in 1947 to a group led by David Jacobs, taking back a mortgage of $355,000; at the time, the property was valued at $500,000.

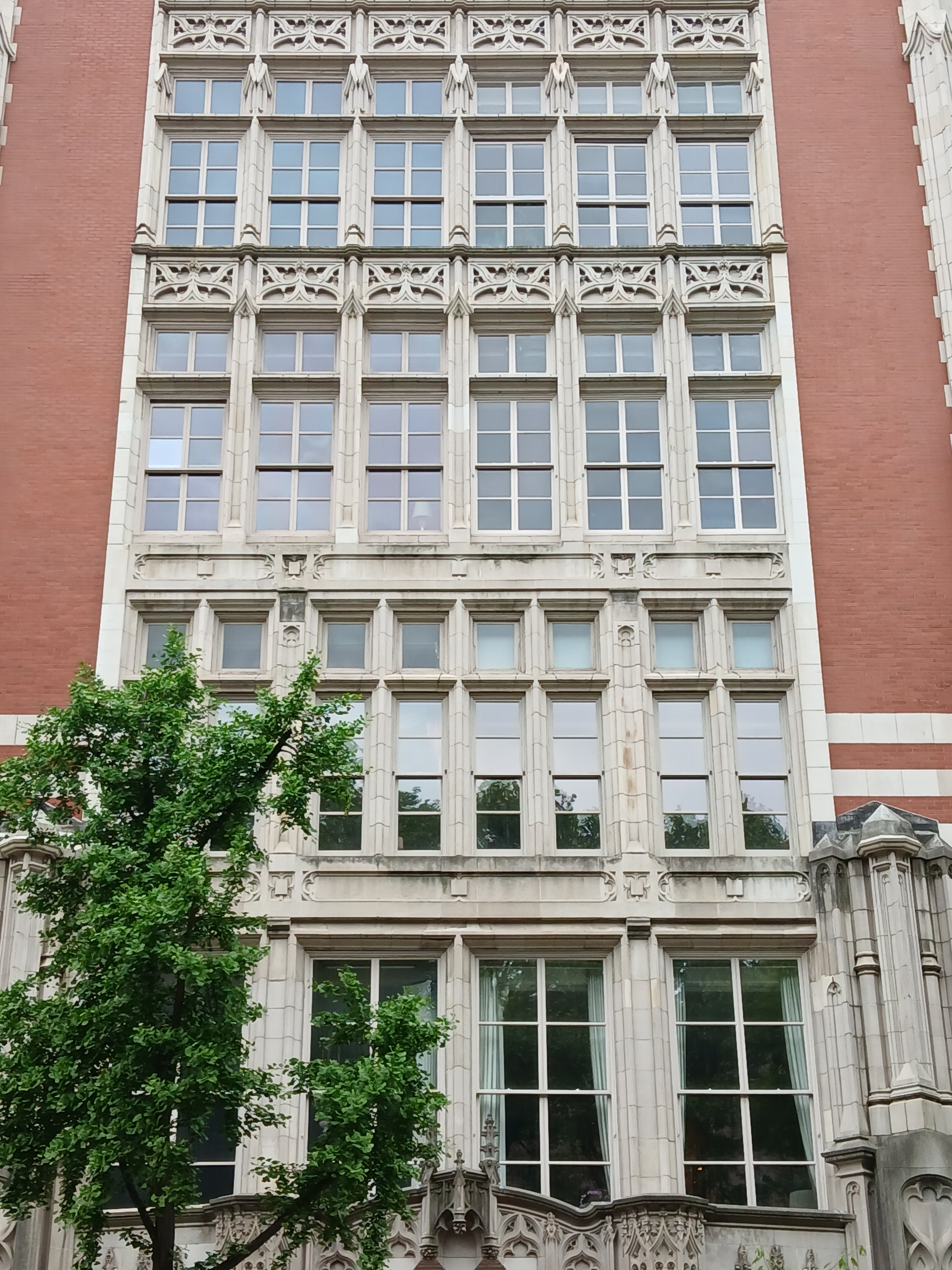
Detail of windows

In 1970, the building was reconverted to cooperative ownership. It became a contributing property to the New York City Landmarks Preservation Commission's Central Park West-76th Street Historic District, designated in 1977. 44 West 77th Street was also added to the National Register of Historic Places in 1983. The facade was again repaired in the early 1990s; the work, which cost $500,000, involved fixing leaks and repairing loose portions of the facade. The original design details were not restored at the time because it would have cost millions of dollars, a high burden for each resident, since at the time there were just 33 apartments.

== Notable residents ==
- Karl Bitter, sculptor
- Roald Dahl, writer; lived there with Patricia Neal in the 1950s
- Robert MacNeil, news anchor
- Patricia Neal, actress; lived there with Roald Dahl in the 1950s
- Jacob Panken, lawyer
- Samuel M. Roosevelt, portraitist
- Aaron Shikler, portraitist; occupied a 3,500-square-foot (330 m^{2}) apartment where he completed many of his portraits

== Reception ==
When the building was completed, it was likened to a "Brobdingnagian cathedral". One source wrote that the design was intended to draw attention, "first from a certain bizarre effect and later from the novelty and interest of the facade". Architects and Builders Magazine wrote that the design made passersby "stare and gasp". By contrast, Architectural Record regarded it as an "apartment house aberration" and preferred that the facade be less elaborately decorated, saying the building's "freakish front" could be seen as a form of self-aggrandizement for the architect. Stone magazine criticized the use of terracotta when the facade was repaired in 1911, predicting that "we are ready to return to safe and sane methods of construction". The New York Times wrote that Harde & Short's designs of 44 West 77th Street, 45 East 66th Street, and the Alwyn Court were unrivaled "in the amount and complexity of facade detail". The historian Andrew Alpern wrote that the facade details seemed to "have been squeezed out of a pastry tube".

== See also ==
- National Register of Historic Places listings in Manhattan from 59th to 110th Streets

== Sources ==
- Alpern, Andrew (January 1, 1992). Luxury Apartment Houses of Manhattan: An Illustrated History. Courier Corporation. ISBN 978-0-486-27370-9.
- Central Park West - 76th Street Historic District (PDF) (Report). New York City Landmarks Preservation Commission. April 19, 1973.
- National Register of Historic Places Inventory/Nomination: Studio Apartments (PDF) (Report). National Park Service. 1983.
- "Studio Apartment House; 44 West 77th Street, New York". Architects' and Builders' Magazine. William T. Comstock. 1909.
