= Alwyn Court =

Residential building in Manhattan, New York

- U.S. National Register of Historic Places
- New York State Register of Historic Places
- New York City Landmark
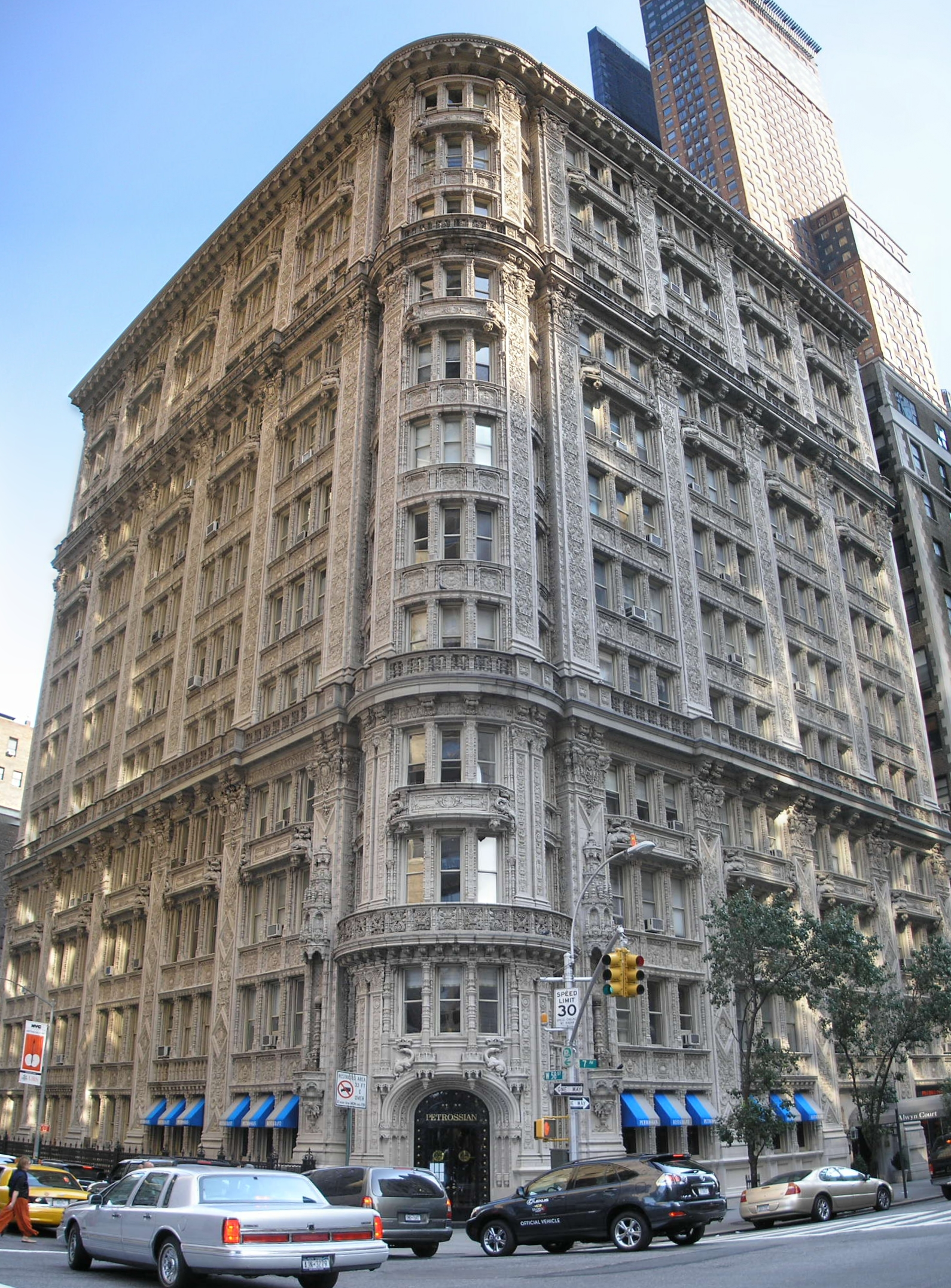
- The facade as seen in 2007 from Seventh Avenue and 58th Street
- Location: 180 West 58th Street; Manhattan, New York, U.S.
- Coordinates: 40°45′57″N 73°58′46″W
- Built: 1907–1909
- Architect: Harde & Short
- Architectural style: French Renaissance
- NRHP reference No.: 79001599
- NYSRHP No.: 06101.000539
- NYCL No.: 0254

Significant dates
- Added to NRHP: December 26, 1979
- Designated NYSRHP: June 23, 1980
- Designated NYCL: June 7, 1966

The Alwyn Court, also known as the Alwyn, is an apartment building at 180 West 58th Street, at the southeast corner with Seventh Avenue, in the Midtown Manhattan neighborhood of New York City, United States. The Alwyn Court was built between 1907 and 1909 and was designed by Harde & Short in the French Renaissance style. It is one of several luxury developments constructed along Seventh Avenue during the late 19th and early 20th century.

The building is thirteen stories tall. Its facade is clad with elaborate terracotta ornamentation in the Francis I style, with a main entrance on Seventh Avenue and 58th Street. Inside is an octagonal courtyard with a painted facade by artist Richard Haas, as well as a location of the Petrossian caviar bar. The Alwyn Court was originally built with twenty-two elaborately decorated apartments, two on every floor, which typically had fourteen rooms and five bathrooms. The interior was subdivided into 75 apartments in 1938.

The Alwyn Court was named after Alwyn Ball Jr., one of the building's developers. Despite a fire shortly after its opening, the Alwyn Court quickly became one of New York City's most expensive apartment buildings. During the early 20th century, ownership changed several times. By the 1930s, the last luxury tenant had moved out, and the building's interior was completely rebuilt. The Alwyn Court was made a New York City designated landmark in 1966, and added to the National Register of Historic Places in 1979. The building was renovated and converted to cooperative apartments in 1980, and the facade was restored in the late 1990s and early 2000s.

== Site ==
The Alwyn Court is at 180 West 58th Street, on the southeast corner with Seventh Avenue and one block south of Central Park, in the Midtown Manhattan neighborhood of New York City, United States. The site covers 12,525 square feet (1,164 m^{2}), with a width of 100 feet (30 m) on Seventh Avenue and a depth of 125 feet (38 m) on 58th Street. The Alwyn Court occupies 9,500 square feet (883 m^{2}), or about three-quarters of its lot. The remaining area is occupied by an atrium at the center of the building, as well as a small courtyard running on the east and south sides.

The Alwyn Court shares the city block with The Briarcliffe to the south and 165 West 57th Street and One57 to the east; it is cater-corner from 200 Central Park South to the northwest. It is also near the Saint Thomas Choir School and the American Fine Arts Society (also known as the Art Students League of New York building) to the west; the Osborne Apartments and the Rodin Studios to the southwest; Carnegie Hall to the south; Hampshire House to the northeast; and the New York Athletic Club and Essex House to the north. The Alwyn Court is one block north of an artistic hub that developed around West 57th Street between Sixth Avenue and Broadway during the late 19th and early 20th centuries, following the opening of Carnegie Hall in 1891. It was one of several luxury buildings developed around Carnegie Hall, on the northernmost end of Seventh Avenue, by the beginning of the 20th century.

== Architecture ==
The thirteen-story Alwyn Court is 149 feet (45 m) tall, with twelve full stories and a smaller penthouse. It was designed by Herbert Spencer Harde and R. Thomas Short of the firm Harde & Short in the French Renaissance style, with Francis I detailing on the facade. The Alwyn Court was erected by the Hedden Construction Company. The building is similar in plan to the Dakota, completed in 1884, and the Apthorp, completed in 1908; all three buildings originally contained large apartments arranged around either a light court or courtyard. Although the interior and main entrance have been altered, almost all of the facade remains intact.

=== Facade ===
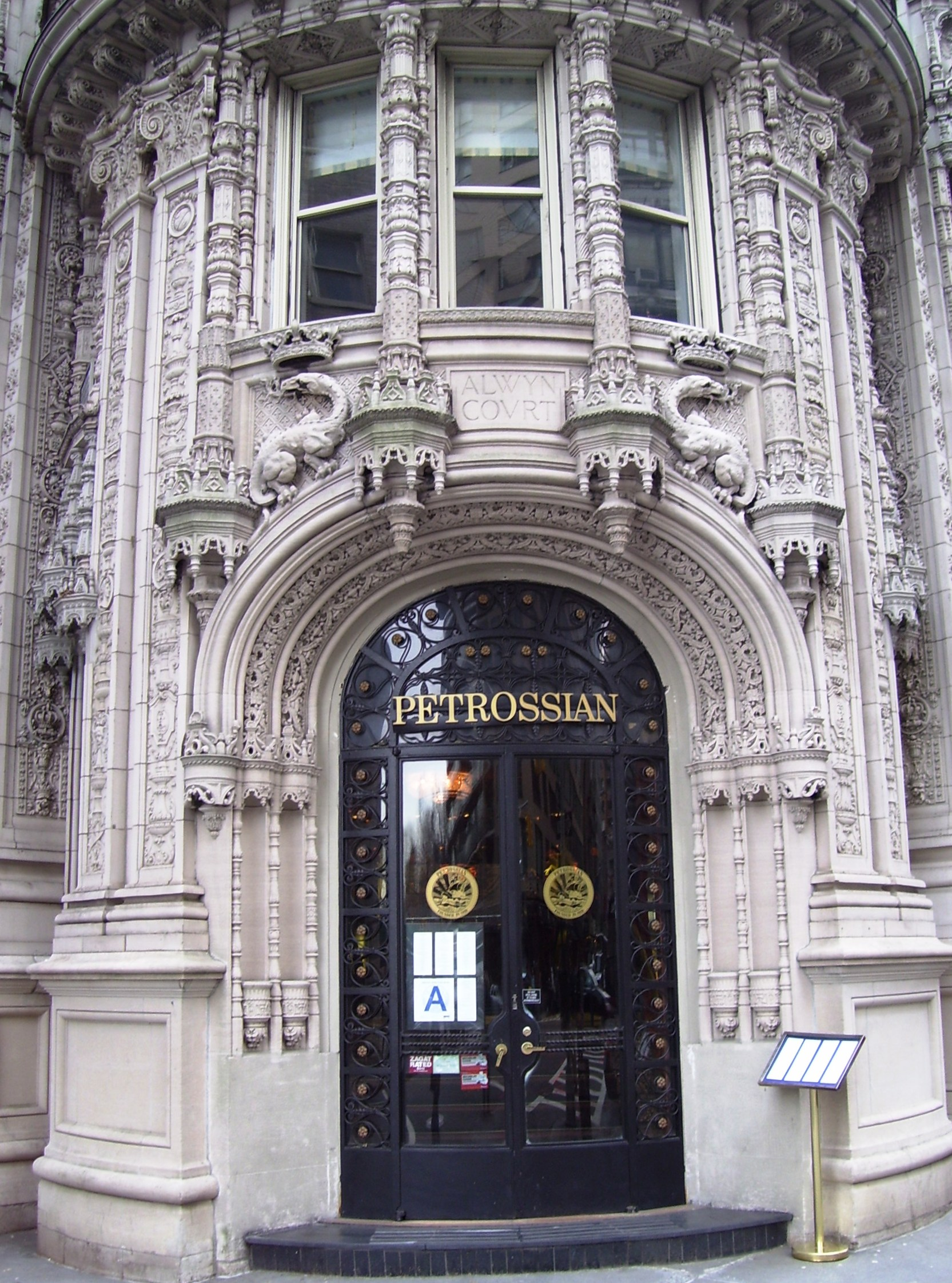
Entrance in the rounded corner

In contrast to many luxury apartment buildings erected at the beginning of the 20th century, which contained ornate detailing mostly on the bottom and top stories, the Alwyn Court's decoration is spread throughout all parts of the facade. The decorative terracotta details on the facade include quattrocento-style pilasters, baldachin-like canopies, and crowned salamanders representing Francis I, in addition to fleurs-de-lis, cameos, and escutcheons. The Alwyn Court uses terracotta because, at the time of its construction, it cost one-third as much as other material such as stone. Since it was possible to reuse the molds that were used to bake the terracotta, the amount of decoration was limited only by the number of unique designs.

The Alwyn Court's twelve-story facade is divided into three horizontal sections: a four-story base, a five-story shaft, and a three-story crown. These sections are separated by large decorative bands. The northern facade, on 58th Street, is divided vertically into five bays while the western facade on Seventh Avenue is subdivided into four bays. Each bay has three sash windows per floor, which are separated from each other by vertical mullions and spandrels. There are decorative spandrel panels between the windows on each floor. Additionally, the bays are separated horizontally by decorative pilasters topped with Corinthian-style capitals. Above the twelfth story, a cornice projects from the roof.

The northern and western facades are joined by a rounded corner, which contains an ornately detailed, recessed entrance archway. According to architectural writer Frank Winkler, rounded corners were desirable because their "simultaneous command [...] of two streets furnishes an interior attraction which any occupier would be delighted to acquire...". The corner entrance served as the Alwyn Court's main entrance before the building's renovation in 1938, when the ground-floor corner space was reconfigured into retail space. The modern-day main entrance is on Seventh Avenue, closer to the elevators than the original corner elevators.

=== Interior ===
As the Alwyn Court's construction predated fire codes, there were no fire escapes, and only minimal space for a single staircase on each floor. The staircase created a potential fire chimney, being open to the entire building. However, the building did contain fireproof materials such as brick exterior walls, as well as concrete floors, walls, and partitions. Each story has ceilings 10.5 feet (3.2 m) tall. In addition, the basement contained a wine vault for each tenant. The original design contained two passenger elevators and a service elevator. The staircase and elevators originally opened onto the southeastern corner of the atrium. When the building was renovated in 1938, the elevators were relocated.

==== Lobby and atrium ====
The main lobby on Seventh Avenue, created in 1938, replaces the original lobby at the corner of Seventh Avenue and 58th Street. It contained peppermint-green walls with white plaster ornament, as well as a foyer with glass doors. The lobby contained ornamentation themed to music, including a red-marble mantlepiece in the foyer with carvings of pipes, horns, and violins, as well as lighting fixtures shaped like lyres. Some of this decoration has since been removed. North of the lobby is a retail space, accessed from the corner entrance, which houses the Petrossian caviar bar. Petrossian contains a private residents' entrance from the lobby.

The atrium at the center of the building is octagonal, with four longer sides parallel to the main dimensions of the building, as well as four chamfered corners. (Note: The octagon is symmetrical and, according to The New York Times, measures either 30 feet (9 m) or 32 feet (10 m) across.) The atrium was originally an air shaft, with 286 frosted windows overlooking it. Between 1979 and 1981, the air shaft was covered with a skylight. The courtyard was landscaped with a fountain and trees, becoming an enclosed atrium. At the first floor, the atrium was re-clad with multicolored marbles, and some stone benches were installed. In the public corridors surrounding the atrium, the windows were replaced with railings. The atrium's facade contains a trompe l'oeil mural painted by artist Richard Haas. The mural, painted in several hues of tan, depicts imitation architectural detail resembling the facade of the exterior.

==== Apartments ====
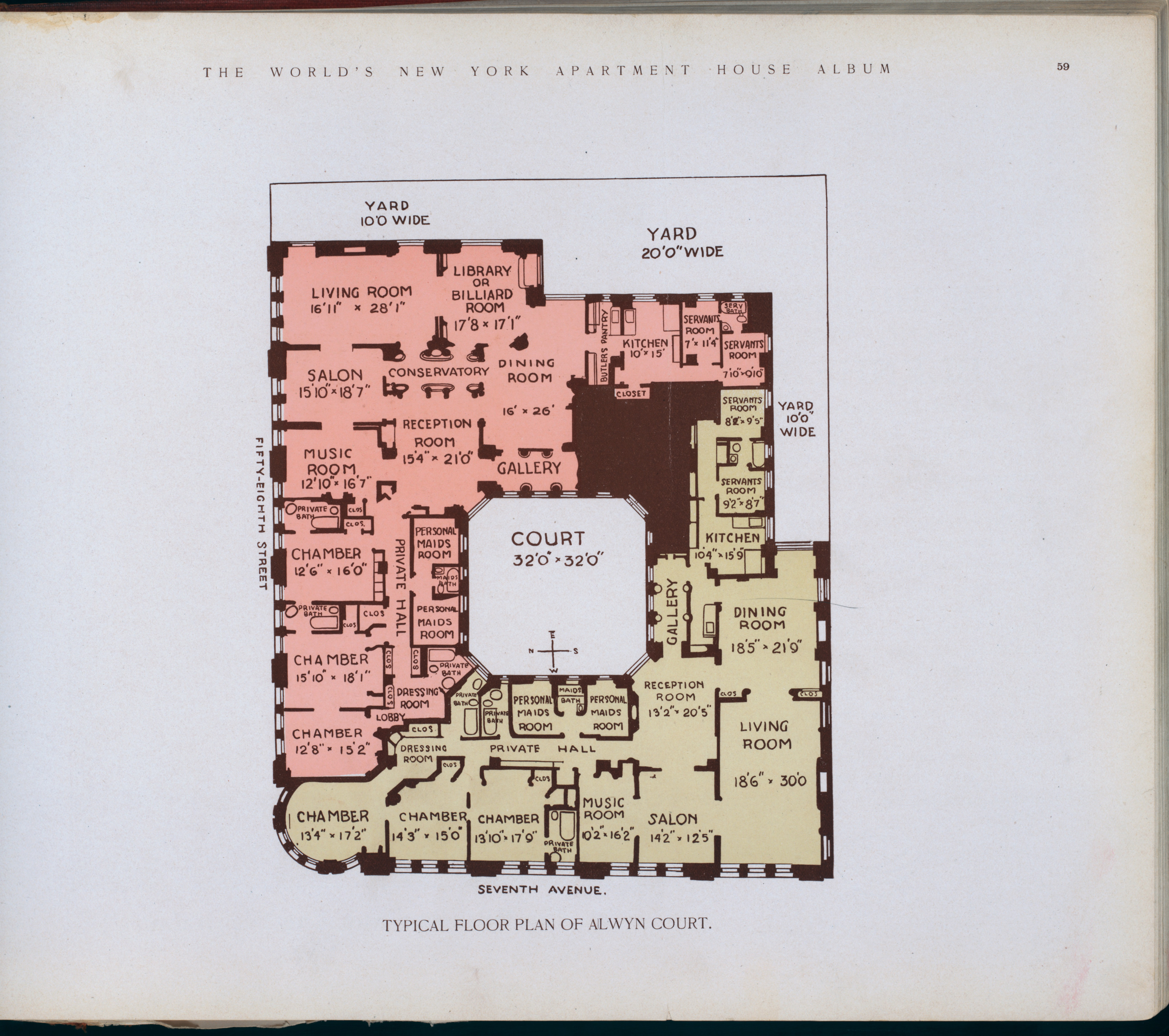
Typical floor plan of Alwyn Court from The [New York] World's loose leaf album of apartment houses (1910)

The Alwyn Court originally had up to 22 apartments, two each on the first through eleventh floors; several residents combined multiple apartments. One of the units on each floor would occupy the southern and western sides of the floor, while the other unit would occupy the northern and eastern sides. Typical apartments had 14 rooms with five bathrooms, but some units contained up to 34 or 35 rooms. The largest unit, comprising three standard apartments, cost $22,000 (equivalent to $788,000 in 2025 (Note: 1634–1699: McCusker, J. J. (1997). How Much Is That in Real Money? A Historical Price Index for Use as a Deflator of Money Values in the Economy of the United States: Addenda et Corrigenda (PDF). American Antiquarian Society. 1700–1799: McCusker, J. J. (1992). How Much Is That in Real Money? A Historical Price Index for Use as a Deflator of Money Values in the Economy of the United States (PDF). American Antiquarian Society. 1800–present: Federal Reserve Bank of Minneapolis. "Consumer Price Index (estimate) 1800–".)).

The apartments had rooms of up to 18 by 30 feet (5 by 9 m). Originally, a standard apartment had numerous communal rooms such as an entrance gallery, reception room, conservatory, music room, living room, dining room, and salon. Three rooms in each 14-room apartment faced the central courtyard. At the corner of Seventh Avenue and 58th Street, there were several rooms with curved bow windows. The entertainment spaces could be combined to create a single space of about 1,700 square feet (160 m^{2}), 2,000 square feet (190 m^{2}), or 2,500 square feet (230 m^{2}). The building also had wine vaults in the basement for each tenant. Harde and Short were particularly proud of the Alwyn Court's floor layouts, threatening to sue architects who copied their floor plans.

The apartments were decorated throughout with carved woodwork and bronze-and-iron light fixtures, as well as ornamental plaster and imitation Caen stone by McNulty Brothers. Some residents imported their own decorations; one 34-room unit was designed as a replica of a French castle. An article in the Real Estate Record and Guide described an apartment with white-enamel woodwork, silk tapestries, paneled doors, plate-glass compartments and mirrored walls. The suites also had their own conservatories and large millinery closets, the latter with plate-glass shelves. Other suites included ball-gown closets and dressing closets with mirrors on the doors. In addition, there were wood-burning fireplaces and vacuum-cleaning systems. The twelfth floor contained 34 rooms used as servants' quarters. Each of the apartments originally could function with just three to five servants, in contrast to traditional mansions of the same size that required twice as many staff.

During its 1938 renovation, the Alwyn Court was divided into 75 apartments. Each floor typically had six units, and a penthouse story contained three additional apartments. The apartments contained between three and five rooms apiece. Each unit also contained bathrooms and dining galleries, while the penthouses have roof terraces and solariums. Twelve apartments, at the rounded corner, were fitted with large oval living rooms, while some of the units contained large fireplaces. Because the atrium was still an air shaft at the time of the renovation, none of the major rooms of each apartment face the atrium. Following the 1980s renovation, these units were turned into cooperative apartments. The Alwyn Court also contains storage units, a bike room, and a laundry room for residents.

== History ==
During the early 19th century, apartment developments in the city were generally associated with the working class, but by the 1870s, apartments were also becoming desirable among the middle and upper classes. Furthermore, by the beginning of the 20th century, there were some housing cooperatives in the city that catered specifically to artists, including at 130 and 140 West 57th Street, as well as on 67th Street near Central Park. The original concept for the Alwyn Court also called for it to be an artists' cooperative.

=== Construction ===
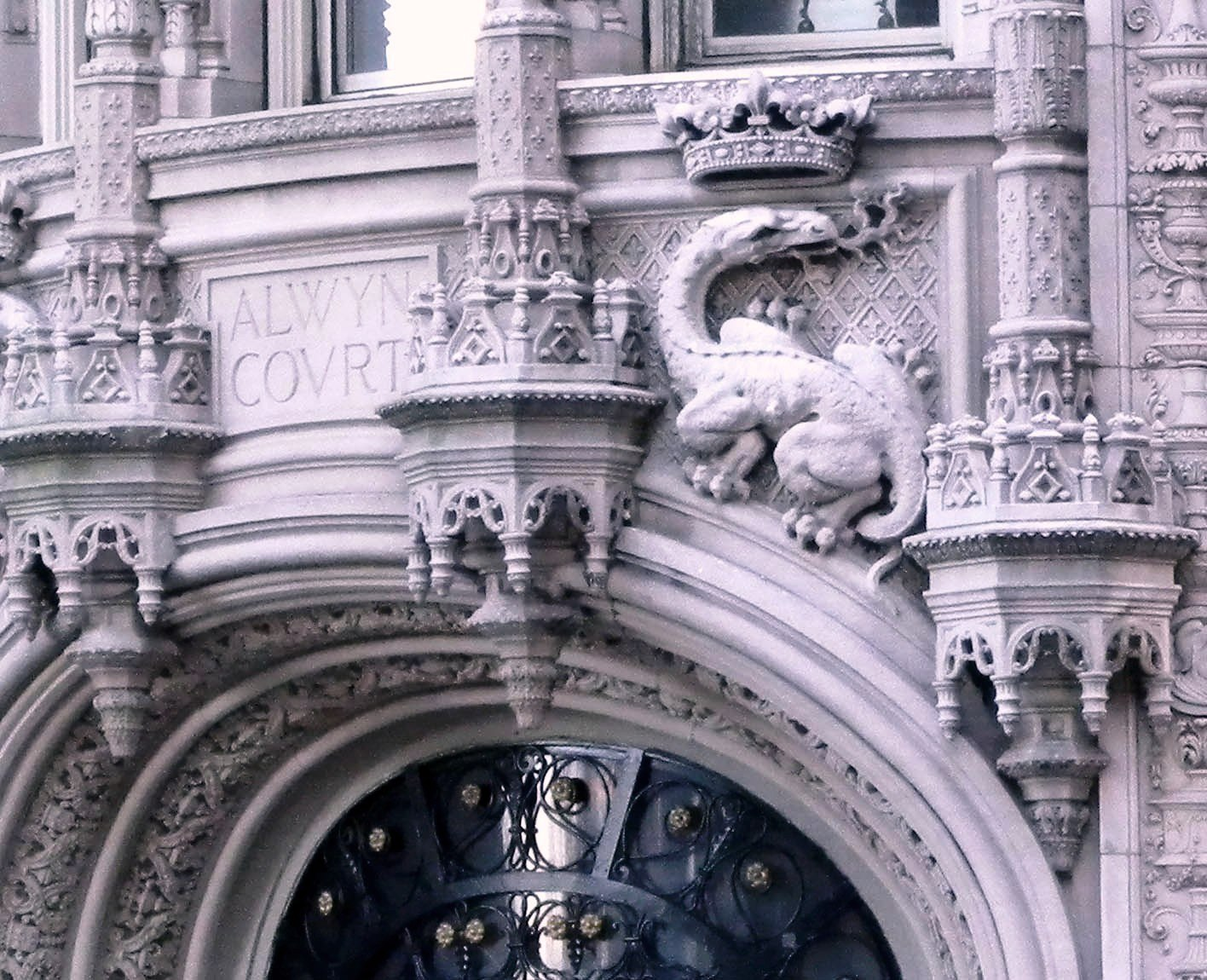
Terracotta detail of a crowned salamander over the doorway at the corner of 58th Street and Seventh Avenue

Stuyvesant Co-operative Buildings, a company founded by artist Walter Russell, purchased the lot at the southeast corner of 58th Street and Seventh Avenue for $500,000 in the first week of June 1907. Russell planned to build a twelve-story apartment house on the site in conjunction with developer Alwyn Ball Jr., the building's namesake. By the next month, the Alwyn Court Corporation had been created to construct the building, and Harde and Short had been selected as the architects. According to E. S. Barlow, a leasing agent who was associated with the Alwyn Court for over three decades, Russell and Ball had originally wanted to select Radcliff & Kelly for the building's design, but selected Harde and Short because of their expertise in designing previous apartment houses. Harde and Short submitted construction plans to the New York City Department of Buildings in October 1907.

The Alwyn Court's construction was delayed slightly by a carpenters' strike against the Hedden Construction Company. The building was nearly completed by September 1909, when the Fifty-Eighth Street and Seventh Avenue Company was formed to operate the apartments. By then, Russell was no longer involved with the Alwyn Court, having gone bankrupt the previous year. In March 1910, with the building still mostly unrented, a fire broke out in an empty apartment on the tenth floor, causing $150,000 worth of damage when it spread to three other floors. The superstructure was undamaged, and the building was quickly repaired.

=== Rental apartment building ===
==== Early years ====
The Alwyn Court had become one of the city's most expensive apartment buildings by late 1910. An article in The New York Times that September said that three units had been rented for $9,000 per year in as many weeks, whereas "a few years ago $5,000 was regarded as an extravagant price to pay for an apartment". The Tribune stated that the building's proximity to Central Park and public transportation gave it an advantage over similar developments. The apartments were advertised as "City Homes for Those with Country Houses", and the building itself was billed as "an up-to-date 'House of Select Residences'". The standard apartments were rented for between $6,500 and $10,000 a year (equivalent to $233,000–358,000 in 2025), while larger apartments cost as much as $22,000 annually (equivalent to $788,000 in 2025). Initially, all leases ran for at least three years. According to the architectural historian Andrew Alpern, at the time, the average New Yorker could live comfortably within the city even if they spent only $2,000 annually (equivalent to $72,000 in 2025).

Soon after the Alwyn Court's opening, one tenant requested that the building's owners merge two of the apartments to create a duplex. Following the success of this duplex conversion, the Alwyn Court's owners decided to merge additional apartments and rent them out at higher rates. The Alwyn Court was foreclosed upon in 1918, and the second-mortgage holders bought the building at auction for $931,801. (Note: The New-York Tribune reported in November 1919 that the second-mortgage holders had sold the building again, although the then-owner denied that the sale happened.) The Grenell Company acquired the building in January 1920 and promptly resold it to Benjamin Winter. The Alwyn Court was resold in July 1930 to Simon & Hartstein, which almost immediately resold it to Edgar A. Levy for $1.3 million. At the time, the building was still considered one of New York City's "most imposing apartment houses".

==== Mid-20th century modifications ====
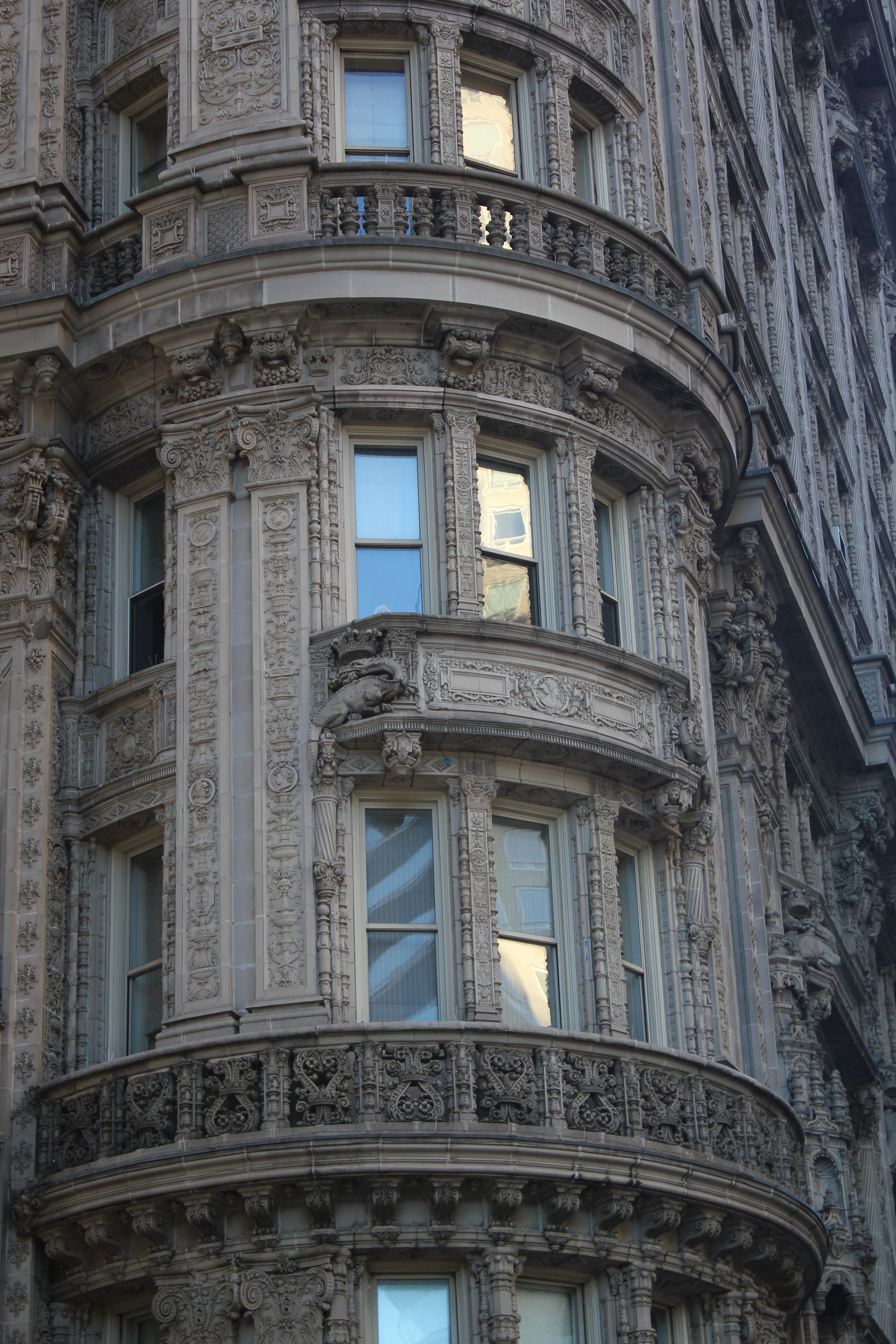
Curved corner detail

By the mid-1930s, the city's architectural and social landscape had changed, and the Alwyn Court was no longer in a desirable part of town. Only about a quarter of the apartments were occupied, and the owners were unable to pay the mortgage. As tenants moved out, the owners had difficulties renting out the remaining apartments. Consequently, the building was placed for sale at a foreclosure auction in 1936, during the Great Depression. Christopher Gray of The New York Times, writing in 1997, stated that the building's telephone directory in 1936 only listed six tenants. The Drydock Savings Bank spent $900,000 to acquire the Alwyn Court; at the time, the building's taxes amounted to $30,000 per year. The bank ordered the eviction of the last tenants. (Note: A contemporary New York Herald Tribune article stated that the Drydock Savings Bank had ordered out all remaining tenants by 1936. However, according to Gray, the eviction did not occur until 1938.) With the Great Depression ongoing, it was no longer feasible for the building to retain such large apartments.

The Drydock Savings Bank decided to remodel the interiors in 1938, with a budget of $500,000. The renovation was designed by Louis S. Weeks and carried out by Ellinger Construction Corporation. Edgar Ellinger of the Ellinger Construction Corporation suggested demolishing the interiors while retaining the facade ornament. As such, the exterior and the floor arches were retained, while the original 22 apartments were split into 75 units. The redesign was necessitated by updated building codes, which made a mere alteration impractical, but because the superstructure was relatively sound, the owner decided not to demolish the building. Interior decorator Dorothy Draper oversaw the remodeling, which included a redecorated lobby and redesigned public corridors. The main entrance had to be relocated as well. The cornice and balustrade atop the building were also taken apart, and the rooftop units, once used by servants, became penthouse apartments.

Two-thirds of the 75 newly subdivided apartments were rented by August 1938, and all apartments had been rented by the following October. The building earned about $137,000 a year in rental income at the time, The units remained fully occupied through the early 1940s. The Alwyn Court's success was attributed to the fact that the rooms were typically larger than in other apartment buildings, and most tenants did not require the large 14-room spaces of the original design. The New York City Landmarks Preservation Commission designated the Alwyn Court as a New York City landmark on June 7, 1966, and the building was added to the National Register of Historic Places on December 26, 1979. By the 1970s, the building had again become dilapidated, and rent control regulations made it difficult for the building to turn a profit.

=== Cooperative conversion ===
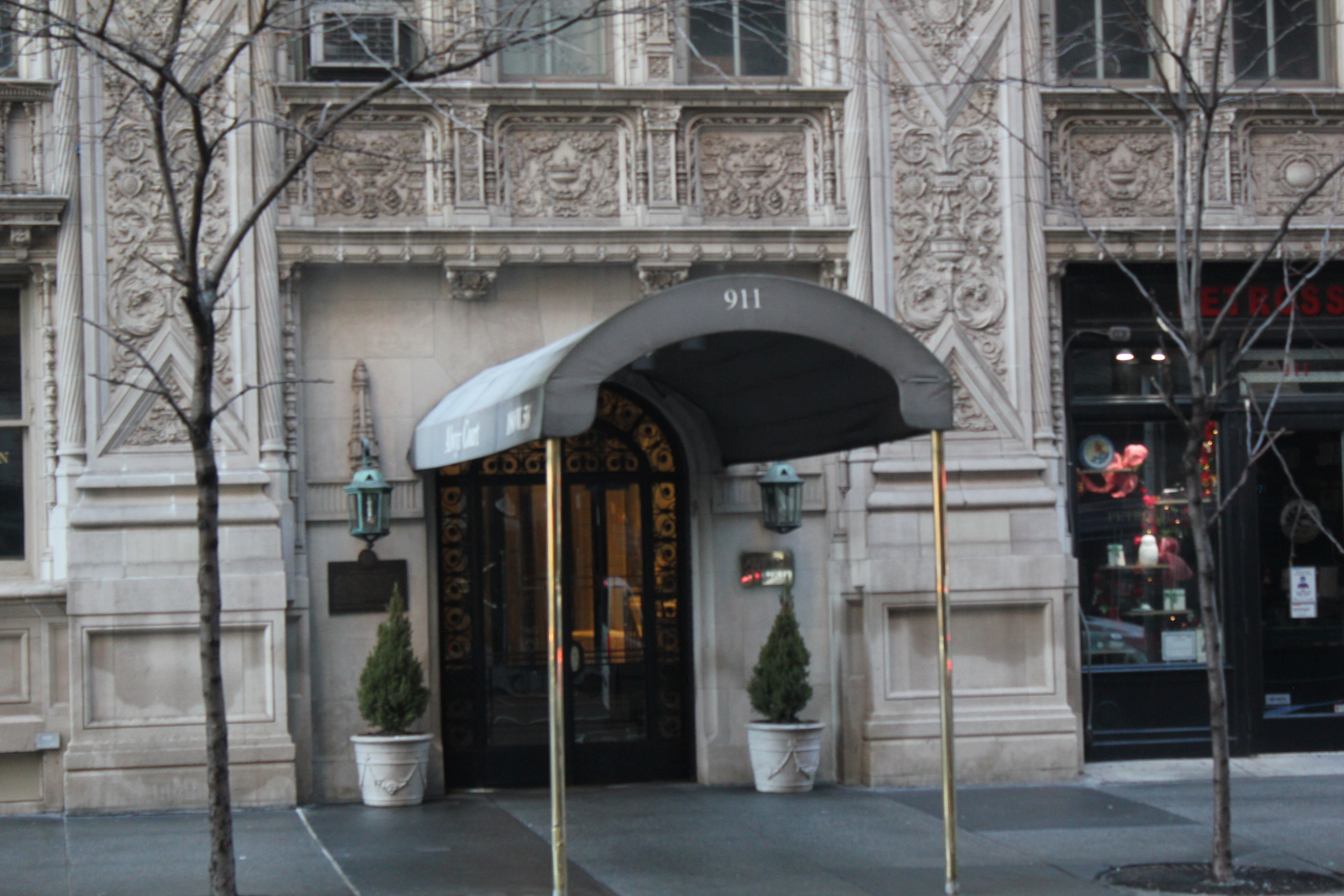
Seventh Avenue entrance

During the late 1970s, David Walentas bought the Alwyn Court for $2 million in cash. In February 1979, Walentas announced a plan to convert the building from rentals to cooperative apartments. At the time, two-thirds of the units were rent-controlled units wherein residents could be exempted from tax increases, and as a result, tenant turnover happened infrequently. As part of the cooperative conversion, the central air shaft was converted into an atrium, and a skylight was installed over it. During the conversion, the facade was also cleaned and restored by Beyer Blinder Belle, while Richard Haas painted the atrium mural. The ground-floor stores were converted to an upscale restaurant. The conversion was completed in August 1980. By the following May, two of the converted cooperative apartments had sold for $175,000 apiece, compared to the rent-controlled units, which were internally valued at between $35,000 and $60,000.

The rent-controlled tenants were slated to be evicted under Walentas's original plan. Following tenant outcry and several lawsuits from both Walentas and the tenants, he changed the plan to allow rent-controlled tenants to remain after the conversion, provided that the Alwyn Court was their primary residence under New York rent control law. Other disputes arose between the tenants and owner, even after the conversion. One such dispute in 1985 concerned the legal definition of a window, specifically whether the openings overlooking the central atrium could be classified as windows or balconies; the dispute had temporarily caused the building's occupancy permit to be revoked. The Petrossian caviar bar opened in the building's base in 1984. The facade was still in poor shape: by 1997, pieces of terracotta were falling from the facade, prompting the owners to install a protective shed over the sidewalk. The facade was subsequently renovated. The New York Landmarks Conservancy awarded the facade's restoration a Lucy G. Moses Preservation Award in 2002. Further facade renovations were conducted in 2005.

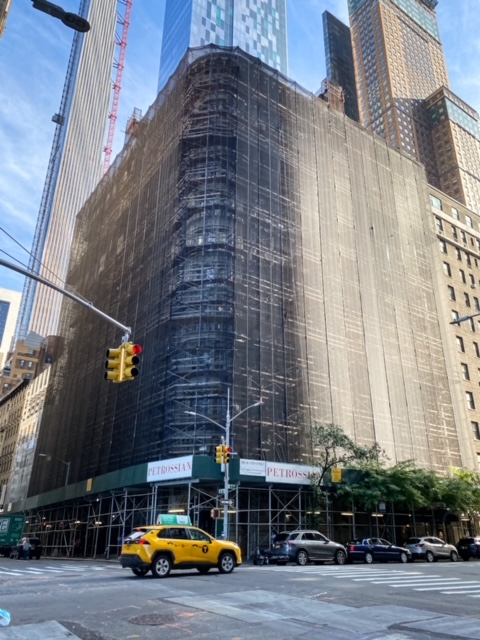
Renovation of the Alwyn Court in 2020

By the early 21st century, the Alwyn Court had regained a status as a luxury apartment building. It had become part of Billionaires' Row, an area with several residential skyscrapers marketed for the ultra-wealthy. In 2013, during the construction of the neighboring One57 on Billionaires' Row, the Alwyn Court was forcibly evacuated because One57's builders were replacing a damaged crane. The Alwyn Court's cooperative board attempted to block the forced evacuation, but the crane was eventually hoisted after the board signed an agreement with One57's developer, Extell Development Company. Another renovation was undertaken starting in 2019.

== Notable residents ==
Upon the Alwyn Court's opening in late 1909, its first tenants included United Cigar Stores president Jacob Wertheim, as well as Steinway & Sons president Frederick Steinway. Philip Roosevelt, John Godfrey Saxe, and Nicholas Schenck also moved to the building during the early 20th century. The building also served as the home of Maurice Wertheim, who lived in the building's 34-room unit. Humorist Fred Allen lived in the building with wife Portland Hoffa. Later in the 20th century, residents included actor Darren McGavin, actor Rita Gam, lawyer Louis Nizer, and actor Natasha Richardson. In the early 21st century, the Alwyn Court was home to residents including actress Jessica Hecht and her director husband Adam Bernstein, designer Amy Lau, and actor Richard Thomas.

== Critical reception ==
The Alwyn Court's facade has generally been positively reviewed throughout the building's history. Shortly after the building's completion, Architects' and Builders' Magazine described the facade as "an incrustation of terra cotta, a filigree of fine ornament on every pilaster, soffit and mullion". An Architecture magazine critic said in 1910, "The design, if made by a pastry cook, would be of the highest excellence, but it can hardly be considered at all in the light of architecture...", stating that the design "defies description". In a 1976 article, The New York Times stated the Alwyn Court's "distinction resides in its extraordinary terra cotta ornamentation".

Modern criticism has also been positive. Architectural writer Elizabeth Hawes wrote in 1993 that the structure was a "great architectural pile designed to impress even the affluent and worldly-wise", Architecture critic Carter Horsley, writing in the early 21st century, referred to the Alwyn Court as New York City's "most ornate building" and stated that its history was a "story of riches to rags and back". In 2020, the Times described the building as "extravagantly ornate", contrasting with the "kind of grand but dour" Osborne Apartments across the street.

== See also ==
- 44 West 77th Street, also designed by Harde & Short
- 45 East 66th Street, also designed by Harde & Short
- List of New York City Designated Landmarks in Manhattan from 14th to 59th Streets
- National Register of Historic Places listings in Manhattan from 14th to 59th Streets
