= 66th Street (Manhattan) =

West-east street in Manhattan, New York

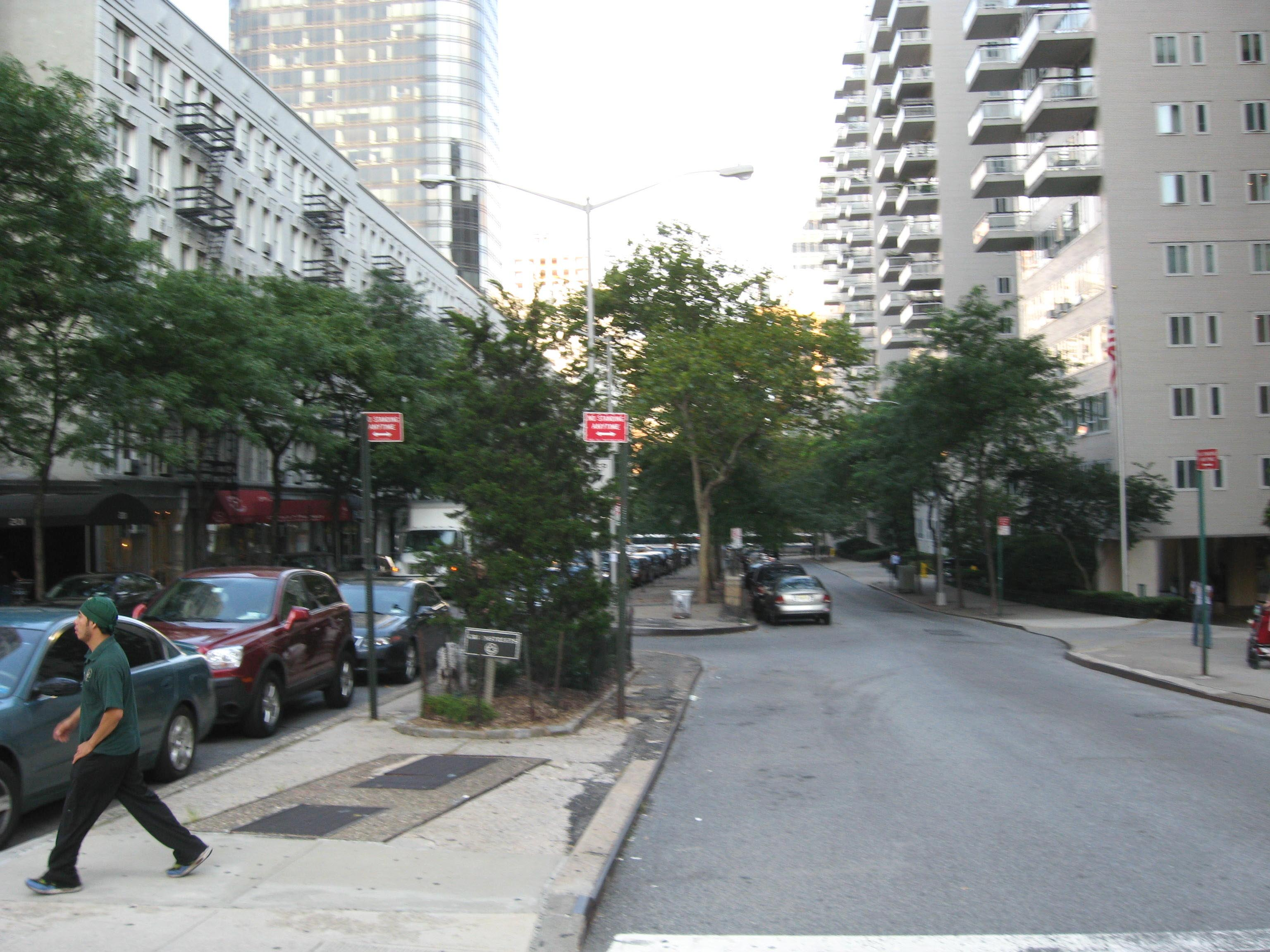
- Two-way block, between 2nd and 3rd Avenues on an otherwise one-way street. Manhattan House, a registered New York City Landmark, on the right.
- Location: Manhattan
- Coordinates: 40.7683°N 73.9691°W

66th Street is a crosstown street in the New York City borough of Manhattan with portions on the Upper East Side and Upper West Side connected across Central Park via the 66th Street transverse. West 66th Street is notable for hosting the Lincoln Center for the Performing Arts between Broadway and Columbus Avenue.

== Route description ==
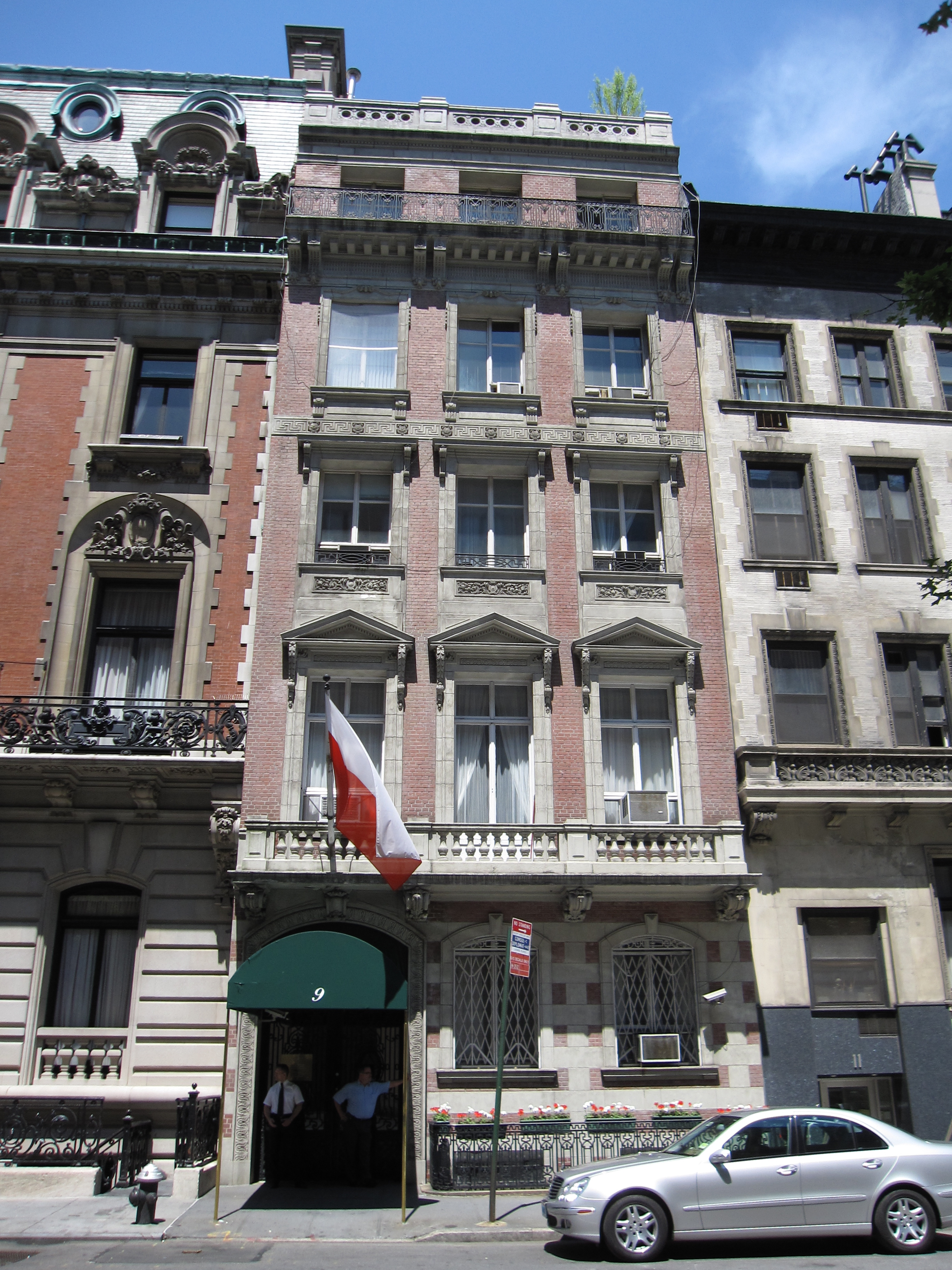
Charles Scribner House on 9 East 66th, houses the Polish Permanent Mission to the United Nations

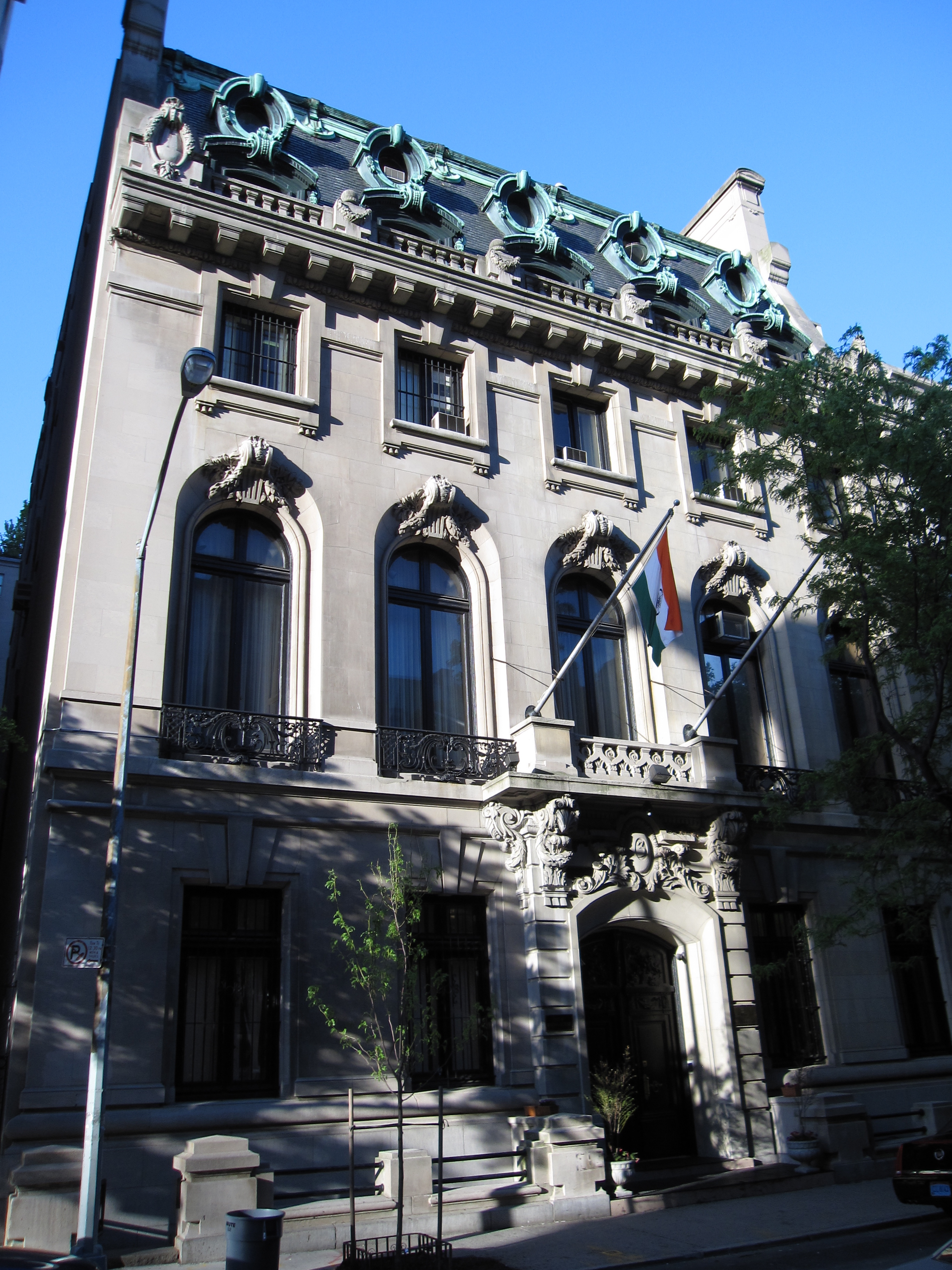
Carrie Astor House on 3 East 64th, houses the Indian Consulate-General

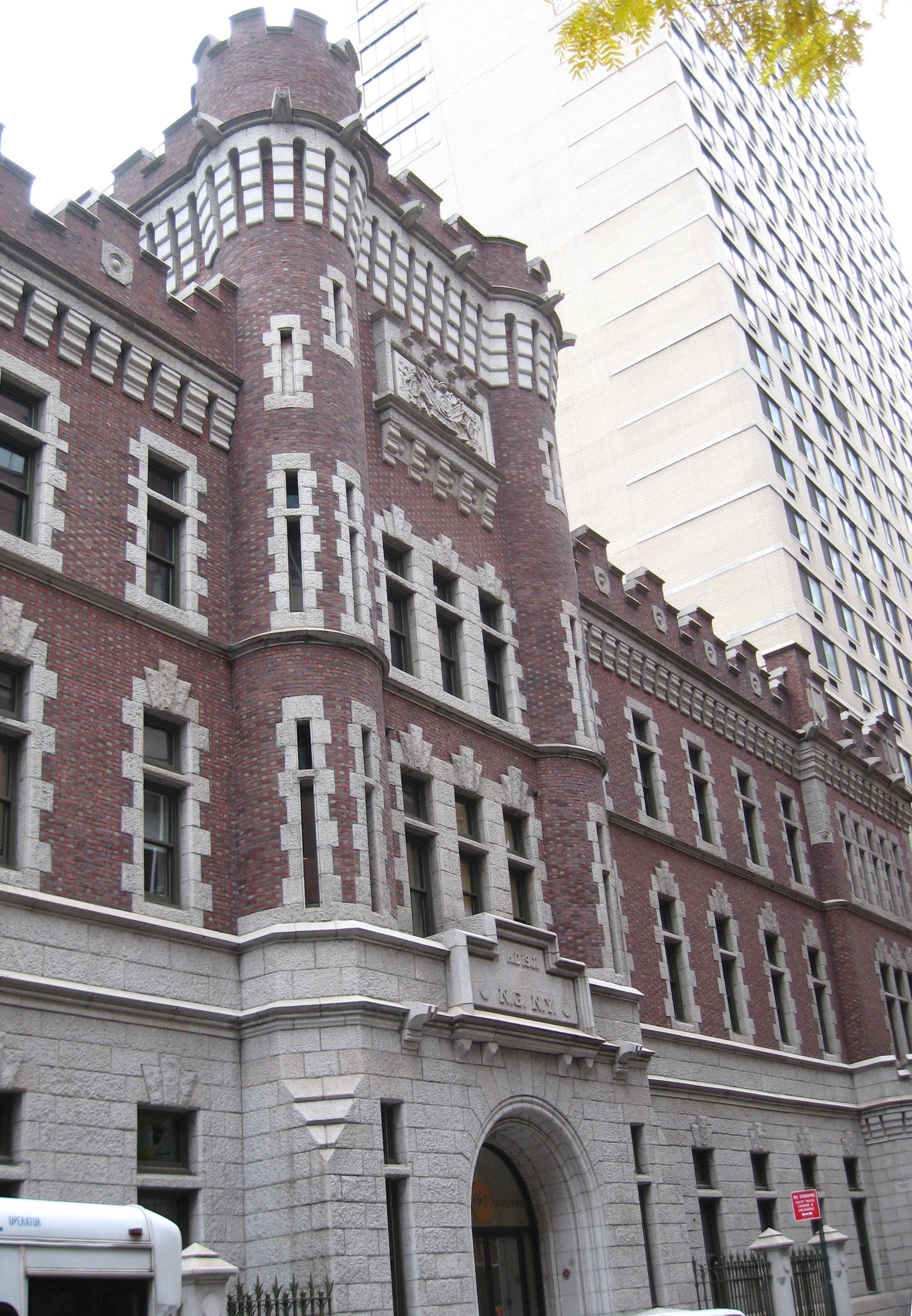
First Battery Armory, New York National Guard, now used by ABC

The street runs westbound, even though even-numbered streets in Manhattan typically go east. Its eastern end on the Upper East Side at York Avenue opposite Rockefeller University. At Fifth Avenue the street enters Central Park on the 66th Street transverse across the park, sharing it with eastbound traffic. West 66th Street runs through a subsection of the Upper West Side named Lincoln Square. Once it crosses West End Avenue, the street ends at Riverside Boulevard in the Riverside South neighborhood.

=== East Side ===
Founder's Hall, located at York Avenue at the eastern foot of East 66th Street, was the first building opened on the campus of Rockefeller University. It was the first major philanthropic foundation created by John D. Rockefeller Jr. The building was declared a National Historic Landmark in 1974 and is still used as a laboratory.

Manhattan House, located at 200 East 66th Street, was designated as a New York City landmark in 2007 by the New York City Landmarks Preservation Commission for its influential mid-century modernist architecture. Benny Goodman, Grace Kelly, architect Gordon Bunshaft and other distinguished residents lived there. The street was widened during its construction.

The Cosmopolitan Club is a private women's club located between Park Avenue and Lexington Avenue. Members have included Willa Cather, Ellen Glasgow, Eleanor Roosevelt, Jean Stafford, Helen Hayes, Pearl Buck, Marian Anderson, Margaret Mead, and Abby Aldrich Rockefeller. The building was purchased by the club in 1930.

45 East 66th Street is the site of a red-and-white French Gothic 10-story apartment house completed in 1908 for Charles F. Rodgers as designed by architects Harde & Short. The site was added to the National Register of Historic Places in 1980.

=== West Side ===
The block between Columbus Avenue and Central Park West is the address for the ABC News Headquarters and was co-named Peter Jennings Way in 2006 in honor of the late news anchor. The First Battery Armory is in the middle of the block at 56 West 66th Street. The restaurant Tavern on the Green is located in Central Park off of West 66th Street, at Central Park West.

66th Street is the site of the Manhattan New York Temple of the Church of Jesus Christ of Latter-day Saints. The design for the 38-story structure included retail space at ground level, a church center on lower floors and 325 apartments. In 1972, the plan faced opposition from community organizations and Manhattan Borough President Percy Sutton who protested against the policy on exclusion of blacks from ministerial roles in the church, which was not ended until 1978.

The Lincoln Center for the Performing Arts covers a 16.3-acre (6.6 ha) site located between Broadway and Amsterdam Avenue, from West 60th to West 66th Street. The project, designed to consolidate many of the city's cultural institutions on a single site, was constructed on the site of the San Juan Hill neighborhood as part of the "Lincoln Square Renewal Project" during Robert Moses' program of urban renewal in the 1960s. The first structure completed and occupied as part of this renewal was the Fordham University School of Law in 1962. The Dauphin Hotel was among the structures demolished in 1960 as part of the project.

In 1972, the Chinese government purchased the 10-story Lincoln Square Motor Inn at Broadway for nearly $5 million, which was turned into the Chinese Mission to the United Nations, including offices and residences for its delegation in New York. The location made it the only permanent headquarters of any country to be situated on the West Side of Manhattan. In 1998, the Chinese government swapped the site for buildings located on First Avenue and 34th Street, in order to be closer to the UN. The site was converted into a 100-apartment extension of the Phillips Club, an extended stay hotel.

Lincoln Towers is an apartment complex that consists of six buildings with eight addresses on a 20-acre (81,000 m^{2}) campus, bounded on the south by West 66th Street, on the west by Freedom Place, on the north by West 70th Street, and on the east by Amsterdam Avenue.

A 1986 plan by Donald Trump would have located a Television City Tower, the world's tallest building — 150 stories and 1,910 feet (580 m) tall — at the corner of West End Avenue and 66th Street, as part of his development of the 100 acre property along the Hudson River between 59th Street and 72nd Street atop the Penn Central rail yards.

==== Community organizations ====
The West 65th and 66th Streets Block Association, founded in April 2018, seeks to promote neighborhood harmony, quality of life and safety through collaborative planning, community action, and policy advocacy. The Block Association has brought attention to larcenies at Duane Reade, lobbied for additional bike corrals for the street, and raised concern about Extell's plans for a 775 ft tower at 36 West 66th Street.

== Parks and recreation ==
Richard Tucker Park, covering 0.05 acres (200 m^{2}) is located at the corner of Broadway and Columbus Avenue. The park includes a bust of operatic tenor Richard Tucker by sculptor Milton Hebald dedicated on April 20, 1980, consisting of a larger-than-life size bronze sculpture on a 6-foot-high (1.8 m) granite pedestal. The original 1978 proposal for a seven-foot statue of Tucker, depicted in the role of Des Grieux in the opera Manon Lescaut by Giacomo Puccini, had been opposed by a member of Manhattan Community Board 7, who felt that the piece should have been placed in the Metropolitan Opera Hall of Fame, and not on public property.

== Notable residents ==
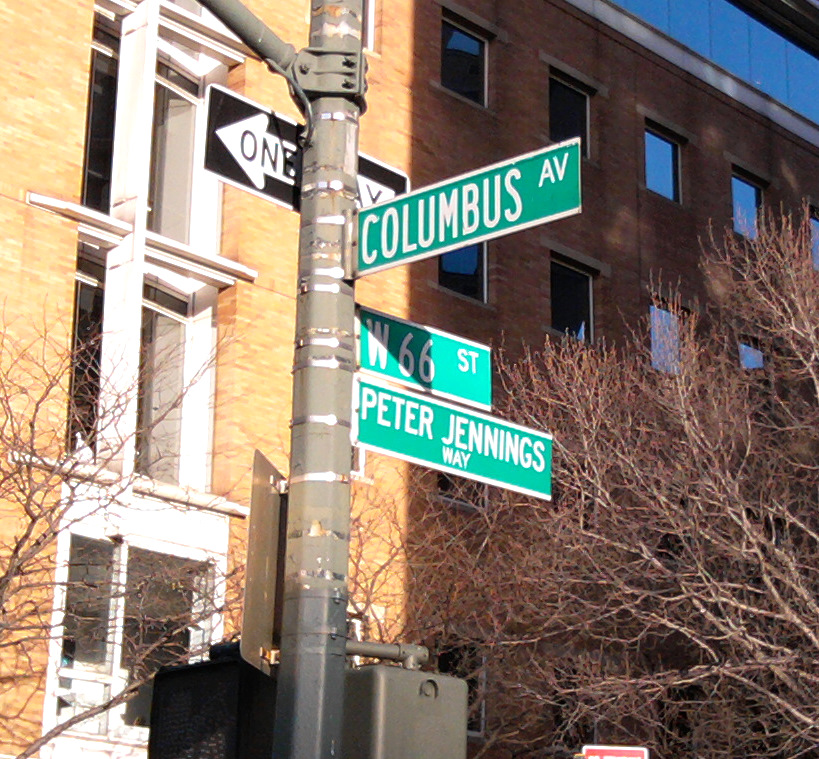
Peter Jennings Way and Columbus Avenue

Notable current and former residents of 66th Street include:

- James Bryant Conant (1893–1978), served as President of Harvard University for 20 years and lived at 200 East 66th Street
- Benny Goodman (1908–1986), bandleader, who resided at 200 East 66th Street
- Ulysses S. Grant (1822–1885), President of the United States, who resided at 3 East 66th Street from 1884 until his death the following year
- Henry Osborne Havemeyer (1847–1907), founder of the American Sugar Refining Company, built his Romanesque-style mansion at 1 East 66th Street
- Grace Kelly (1929–1982), actress and Princess of Monaco, who resided at 200 East 66th Street
- Harriet Burton Laidlaw (1873–1949) and James Lees Laidlaw (1868–1932), national and state leaders in the Suffrage movement, both of whom served as board members of Standard & Poor's
- Phyllis McGinley (1905–1978), poet who won the Pulitzer Prize in 1961, lived at 200 East 66th Street
- Edward Streeter (1891–1976), author best known for his novel Father of the Bride, lived at 200 East 66th Street
- Andy Warhol (1928–1987), central figure in the Pop art movement, lived at 57 East 66th Street with his partner, interior designer Jed Johnson (1948–1996), and their dachshund Archie

== Transportation ==
The 66th Street–Lincoln Center station on the IRT Broadway–Seventh Avenue Line is located at the intersection of 66th Street and Broadway. It is served by the 1 and 2 trains.

The M66 provides crosstown bus service between East 67th Street and York Avenue on the Upper East Side and West 66th Street and West End Avenue on the Upper West Side. Eastbound service uses West 65th and East 68th Streets. The route dates back to one established in 1935 by the Comprehensive Omnibus Corporation. The transverse through Central Park is shared with the M72, and the uptown M20 runs west from Central Park West to Columbus Avenue.
