= Harde & Short =

1900s American architectural firm

Harde & Short was a New York City-based Beaux-Arts architectural firm in the first decade of 20th century. The firm was a partnership between Richard Thomas Short (born circa 1870) and Herbert Spencer Harde (born circa 1873 as Herbert Spencer Steinhardt). Harde & Short was recorded as having formed by 1901 and worked on various small commissions for two years. The firm designed several buildings in Manhattan, including the Red House. Harde & Short is known for their intricacy of design as shown in the facades of Alwyn Court, 44 West 77th Street, 45 East 66th Street, and the Red House. They also designed the two oldest buildings in the York Avenue Estate. The firm split up shortly after the Alwyn Court's completion in 1909.
