= Red House (Upper West Side) =

Residential building in Manhattan, New York

- U.S. National Register of Historic Places
- New York State Register of Historic Places
- New York City Landmark
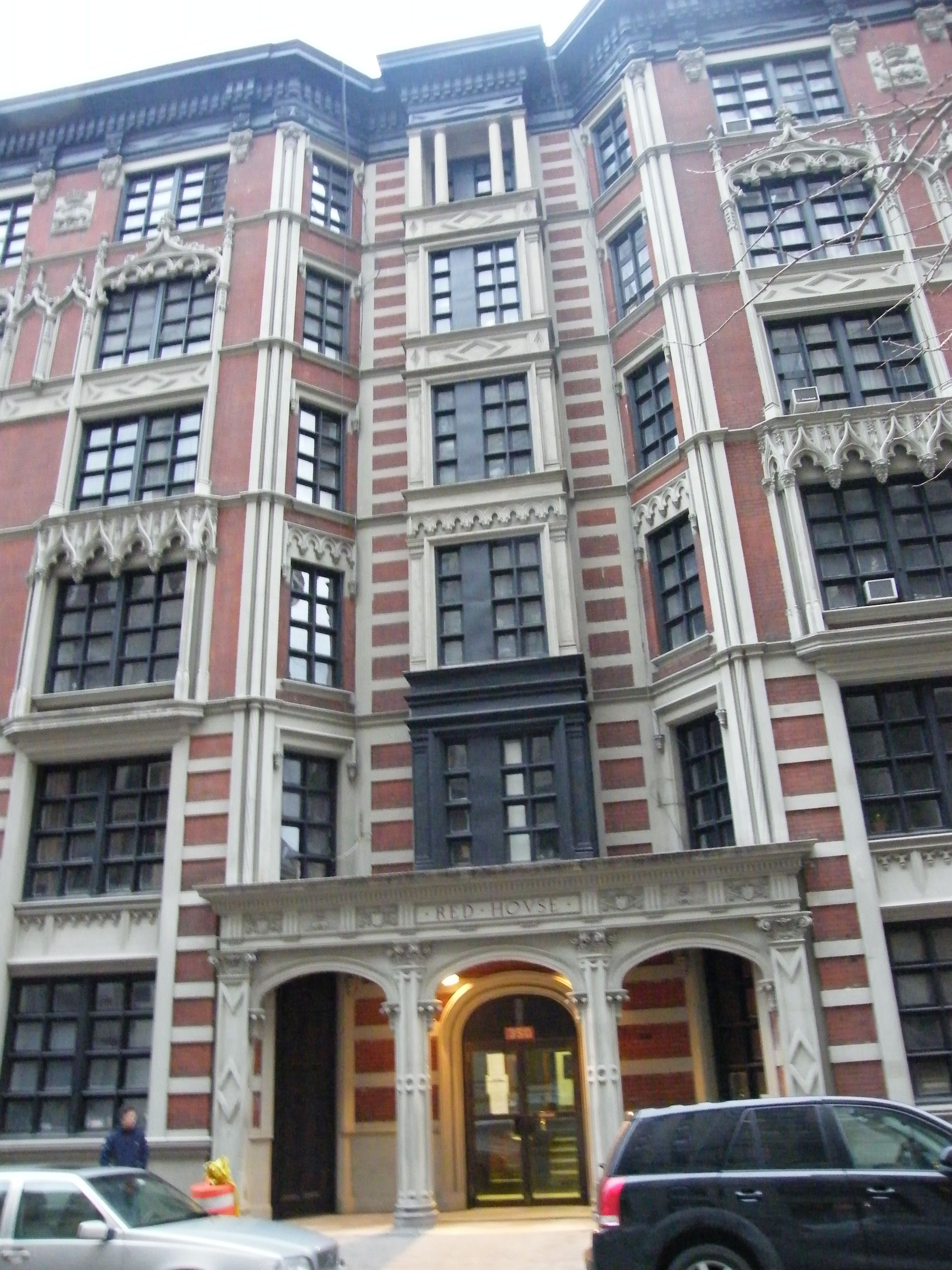

- Location within New York City Location within New York Location within the United States
- Location: 350 West 85th Street, New York, New York
- Coordinates: 40°47′20″N 73°58′49″W
- Built: 1903
- Architect: Harde & Short
- Architectural style: Late Gothic Revival, French Gothic
- NRHP reference No.: 83001742
- NYSRHP No.: 06101.001759
- NYCL No.: 1265

Significant dates
- Added to NRHP: September 8, 1983
- Designated NYSRHP: August 10, 1983
- Designated NYCL: September 14, 1982

The Red House is a 1903 apartment building on the Upper West Side of Manhattan in New York City. It was built on land owned by Canadian architect R. Thomas Short of the Beaux-Arts firm, Harde & Short. He and his firm designed and built the building in a free eclectic mix of French late Gothic and English Renaissance motifs, using red brick and limestone with bold black-painted mullions in the fenestration. The salamander badge of Henri II appears high on the flanking wings and in the portico frieze. The center is recessed, behind a triple-arched screen.

It was added to the National Register of Historic Places on September 8, 1983.

== See also ==
- National Register of Historic Places listings in Manhattan from 59th to 110th Streets
- List of New York City Designated Landmarks in Manhattan from 59th to 110th Streets
