= Lightwell =

Air shaft or atrium

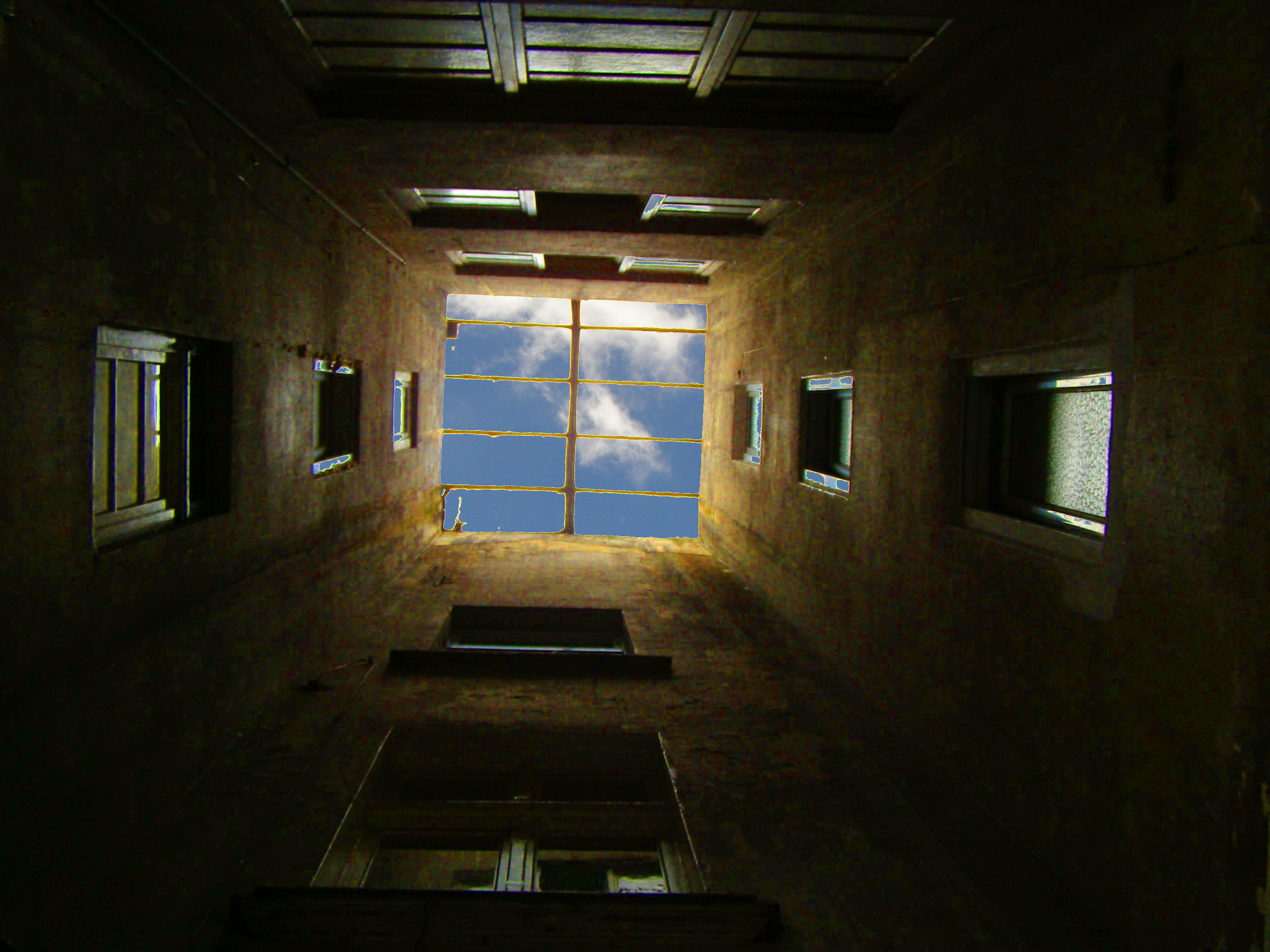
Lightwell

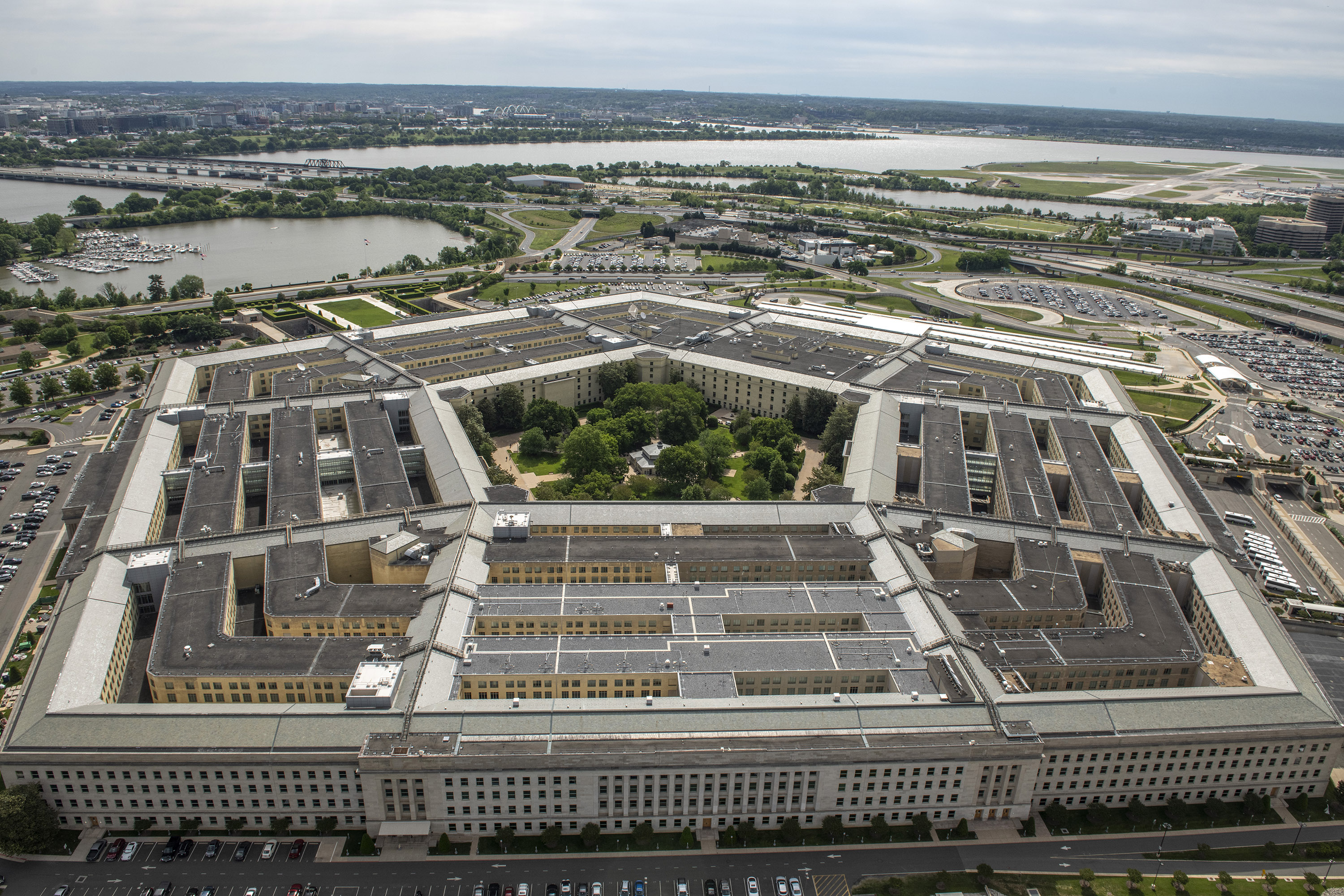
Lightwells in the Pentagon

In architecture, a lightwell, (Note: light well, light-well) sky-well, (Note: skywell, sky well) or air shaft is an unroofed or roofed external space provided within the volume of a large building to allow light and air to reach what would otherwise be a dark or unventilated area. Lightwells may be lined with glazed bricks to increase the reflection of sunlight within the space. Lightwells may have sunlight reflecting mirrors on the top of light well.

Lightwells serve to reduce the necessity for electric lighting, add a central space within the building, and provide an internal open space for windows to give an illusion of having a view outside.

== Area or areaway ==
A subterranean lightwell by any frontage of a building for light to a basement is also called an area (or areaway in North American usage). This may also allow pedestrian access to the building separate from a main door.

== Ancient history ==
The lightwell was used in ancient civilizations, such as the Egyptians and at the Palace of Knossos on Minoan Crete. There are also instances of lightwell use by the Romans, such as the impluvium and compluvium shaft. In traditional Chinese architecture, the 天井 (sky well) also exists.

== See also ==
- Atrium
- Clerestory
- Skylight
- Light tube
- Ventilation shaft
- Daylighting
