= York Avenue Estate =

Historic district in Manhattan, New York

- City and Suburban Homes Company's York Avenue Estate and Shively Sanitary Tenements Historic District; Avenue A Estate
- U.S. National Register of Historic Places
- U.S. Historic district
- New York State Register of Historic Places
- New York City Landmark
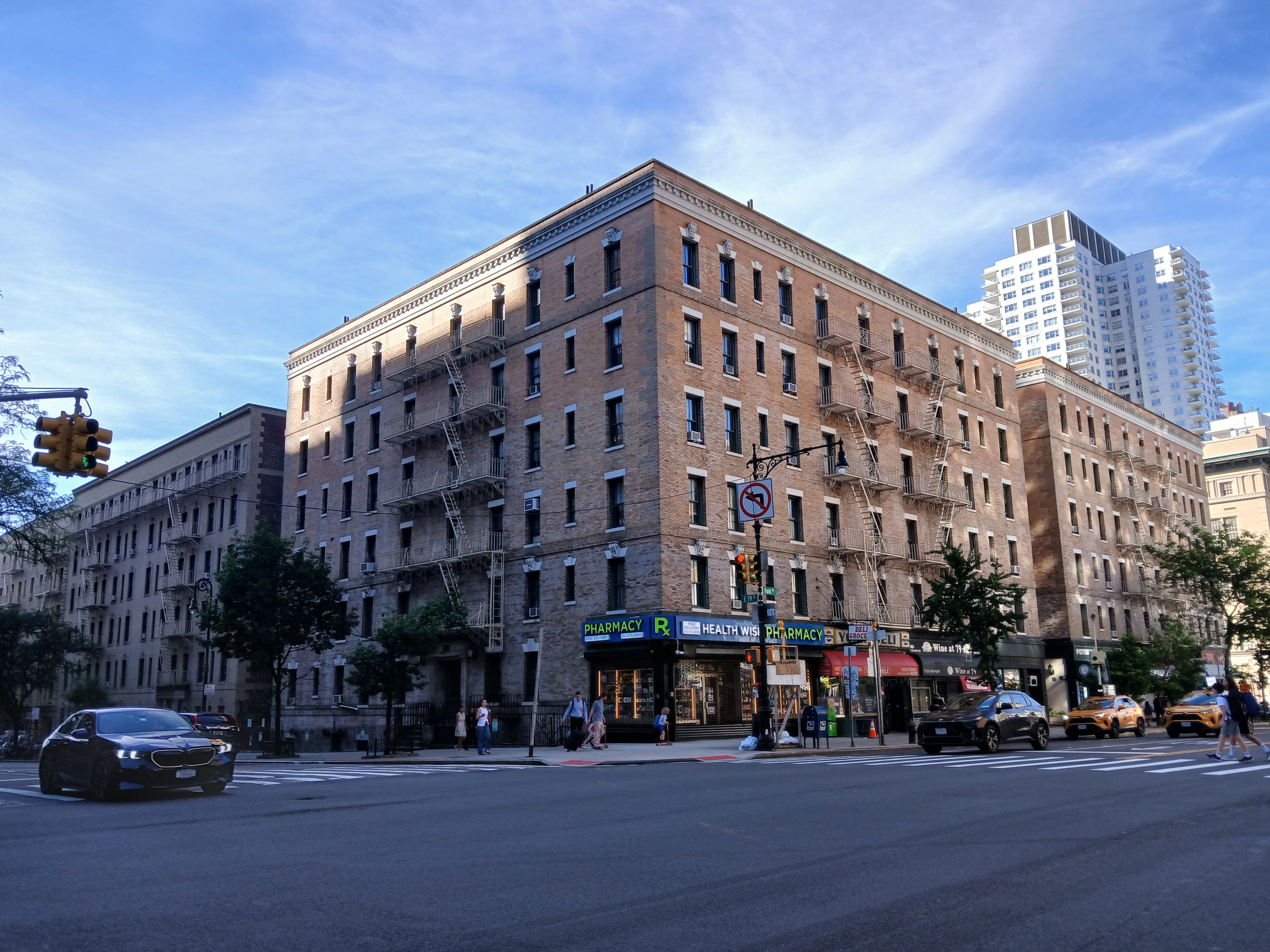
- The York Avenue Estate, seen from York Avenue and 79th Street

- Location within Manhattan Location within New York City Location within New York Location within the United States
- Location: York Avenue, 78th Street, (Note: The NRHP historic district extends south of 78th Street to encompass the Cherokee Apartments between 77th and 78th streets.) FDR Drive, and 79th Street; Manhattan, New York, US
- Coordinates: 40°46′14″N 73°56′58″W
- Area: 4.6 acres (1.9 ha)
- Built: 1908
- Architect: Harde & Short, Percy Griffin, Philip H. Ohm
- Architectural style: Late Gothic Revival, Beaux Arts, Neo-Gothic
- NRHP reference No.: 86003823
- NYCL No.: 1694

Significant dates
- Added to NRHP: September 15, 1994
- Designated NYSRHP: June 6, 1986
- Designated NYCL: April 24, 1990 (York Avenue Estate)

The York Avenue Estate (also known as the Avenue A Estate) is a historic complex of tenement buildings in the Yorkville neighborhood of Manhattan in New York City, New York, US. The complex occupies a city block bounded by FDR Drive and the East River to the east, 79th Street to the north, York Avenue to the west, and 78th Street to the south. The estate is one of the oldest buildings on the Upper East Side built by the City and Suburban Homes Company, a tenement developer. The buildings, along with the neighboring Cherokee Apartments, are listed on the National Register of Historic Places (NRHP) as the City and Suburban Homes Company's York Avenue Estate and Shively Sanitary Tenements Historic District. The York Avenue Estate was also designated by the New York City Landmarks Preservation Commission (LPC) as a city landmark.

The York Avenue Estate consists of fourteen buildings, including a hotel. Harde & Short and Percy Griffin each designed two of the early buildings, while the others were designed by Philip Ohm. The buildings are all of the Beaux-Arts style, except for two Gothic Revival structures named for Episcopal bishop Henry C. Potter. They generally have similar details, floor plans, and materials. Except for the eight-story East End Hotel building at the estate's southeast corner, all the buildings are six stories high.

The city block had been reserved for the New York Protestant Episcopal School but remained undeveloped into the 19th century. The City and Suburban Homes Company bought the western part of the block in 1901, while the rest of the block was acquired in 1905. Work proceeded in phases from York Avenue eastward and was completed in 1913. City and Suburban owned the buildings until 1961, when the company was bought out by the Diversified Management Corporation, operated by the Scheuer family. In 1986, Peter Kalikow bought all the buildings and threatened to demolish the entire estate. Following outcry, Kalikow revised his plans to call for the redevelopment of four buildings; amid continued outcry, the LPC designated the complex as a landmark in 1990. The complex was resold in 1993 and 1994 to a firm operated by Stanley Wasserman Cos., which renovated it.

== Description ==
The York Avenue Estate occupies an entire 204-by-736-foot (62 by 224 m) city block in the Yorkville neighborhood of Manhattan, bounded by York Avenue (formerly Avenue A) to the west, 79th Street to the north, FDR Drive and East River to the east, and 78th Street to the south. It comprises fourteen buildings, consisting of thirteen apartment buildings and a hotel. The complex was built in stages from 1901 onward, with the last buildings constructed in 1913. (Note: Some sources give a different date of 1914.) The first two buildings on York Avenue were built by Harde & Short; two further buildings were constructed by Percy Griffin; and the rest were designed by Philip Ohm. Ernest Flagg is sometimes incorrectly attributed as a designer, though his name is not present on any of the building plans. The York Avenue Estate was one of the oldest tenement projects developed by the City and Suburban Homes Company on Manhattan's Upper East Side, behind only the First Avenue Estate farther south between 64th and 65th streets. The York and First Avenue estates were among a half-dozen full-block estates that the company built in Manhattan.

The Cherokee Apartments, another set of tenements, is immediately south of the York Avenue Estate. The buildings are surrounded by several stylistically separate structures, including post-war apartment buildings to the north and a high-rise building south of 77th Street. John Jay Park is directly opposite 78th Street at the southeast corner of the complex, and the Manhattan Waterfront Greenway is across FDR Drive to the east. At the southwest corner, PS 158 is located directly south of the complex (across 78th Street), while a New York Public Library branch is diagonally across 78th Street and York Avenue.

The York Avenue Estate, along with the adjacent Cherokee Apartments, constitute the City and Suburban Homes Company's York Avenue Estate and Shively Sanitary Tenements Historic District, a US historic district extending south to 77th Street. This district was listed on the National Register of Historic Places (NRHP) in 1994. The York Avenue Estate is also a city landmark, designated by the New York City Landmarks Preservation Commission (LPC) in 1990; the Cherokee Apartments were designated as a separate city landmark in 1985.

List of buildings (west to east)
Address / Name	Location	Completed	Architect	Ref.
1470 York Avenue, 501 East 78th Street	Northeast corner of York Avenue and 78th Street	1901	Harde & Short	
1472 York Avenue, 502 East 79th Street	Southeast corner of York Avenue and 79th Street	1901	Harde & Short	
503–509 East 78th Street	North side of 78th Street	1904	Percy Griffin	
504–508 East 79th Street	South side of 79th Street	1904	Percy Griffin	
510–512 East 79th Street	South side of 79th Street	1906	Philip Ohm	
511–515 East 78th Street	North side of 78th Street	1906	Philip Ohm	
516–520 East 79th Street / Bishop Potter Memorial Building	South side of 79th Street	1909	Philip Ohm	
519–523 East 78th Street	North side of 78th Street	1908	Philip Ohm	
524–528 East 79th Street / Bishop Potter Memorial Building	South side of 79th Street	1909	Philip Ohm	
527–531 East 78th Street	North side of 78th Street	1908	Philip Ohm	
530–534 and 536–540 East 79th Street	South side of 79th Street	1912	Philip Ohm	(Note: The New York City Landmarks Preservation Commission considers 530–534 and 536–540 East 79th Street as two buildings. The National Park Service and The New York Times refer to the structure as a single building with two addresses at 532 and 536 East 79th Street.)
535–539 East 78th Street	North side of 78th Street	1908	Philip Ohm	
541 East 78th Street / Junior League Hotel / East End Hotel	Northwest corner of FDR Drive and 78th Street	1910	Philip Ohm	
542 East 79th Street / William Bayard Cutting Memorial Building	Southwest corner of FDR Drive and 79th Street	1913	Philip Ohm	

=== Exterior ===
The buildings are all of the Beaux-Arts style, except for the two Bishop Potter Memorial buildings at 516–520 and 524–528 East 79th Street. The Potter Memorial buildings were described as being in the Neo-Gothic or Collegiate Gothic styles. Most of the buildings are constructed of yellow and tan brick, with masonry trim made of brick, stone, or terracotta, and are moderately decorated. Details such as brackets with garlands, porticoes, and ornamental fire escape and areaway railings are shared by several buildings. The structures also have brickwork details, such as patterned panels, cornices, or protruding window frames; in some buildings, light and dark bricks are juxtaposed for decorative contrast. The Potter Memorial buildings have brown and tan brick facades to evoke the Neo-Gothic style, along with Neo-Gothic decorations. Unlike all the other structures, 541–555 East 78th Street, originally the Junior League Hotel for Women, was not built as an apartment building.

For the most part, the buildings have similar details, floor plans, materials, and heights, but there are subtle differences between the structures. All the buildings are six stories high, except the Junior League Hotel, which is eight stories high. The buildings occupy wide lots with frontage of at least 100 feet (30 m), providing space for courtyards both in the center and on the perimeter of each structure. There are central courtyards in all except two tenements. Two buildings are entered through their respective courtyards (which are connected directly to the street), a design detail derived from similar courtyard entrances at the Cherokee Apartments. The other buildings each have two entrances facing the street.

==== Western buildings ====
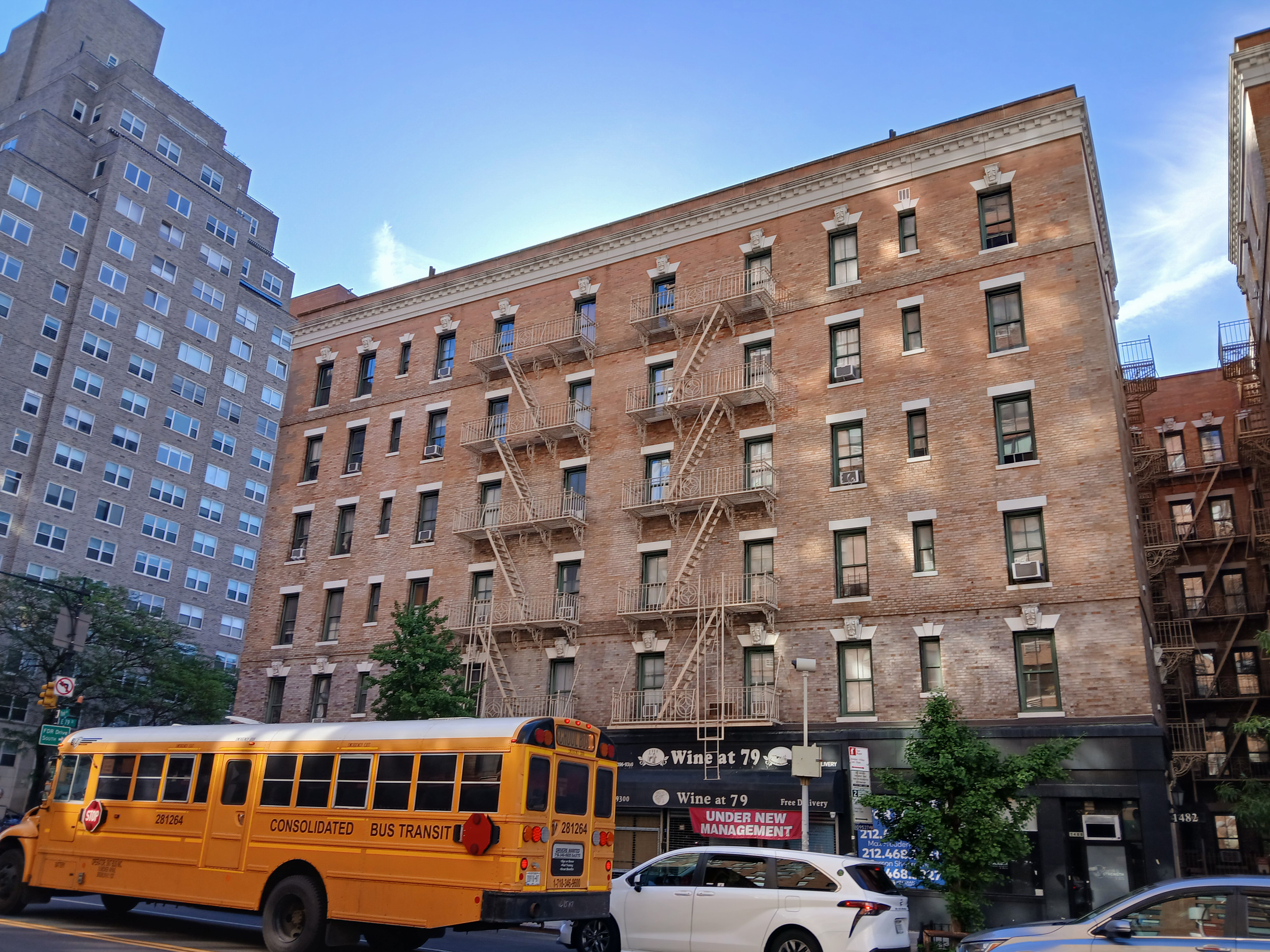
1472 York Avenue, one of the Harde & Short buildings

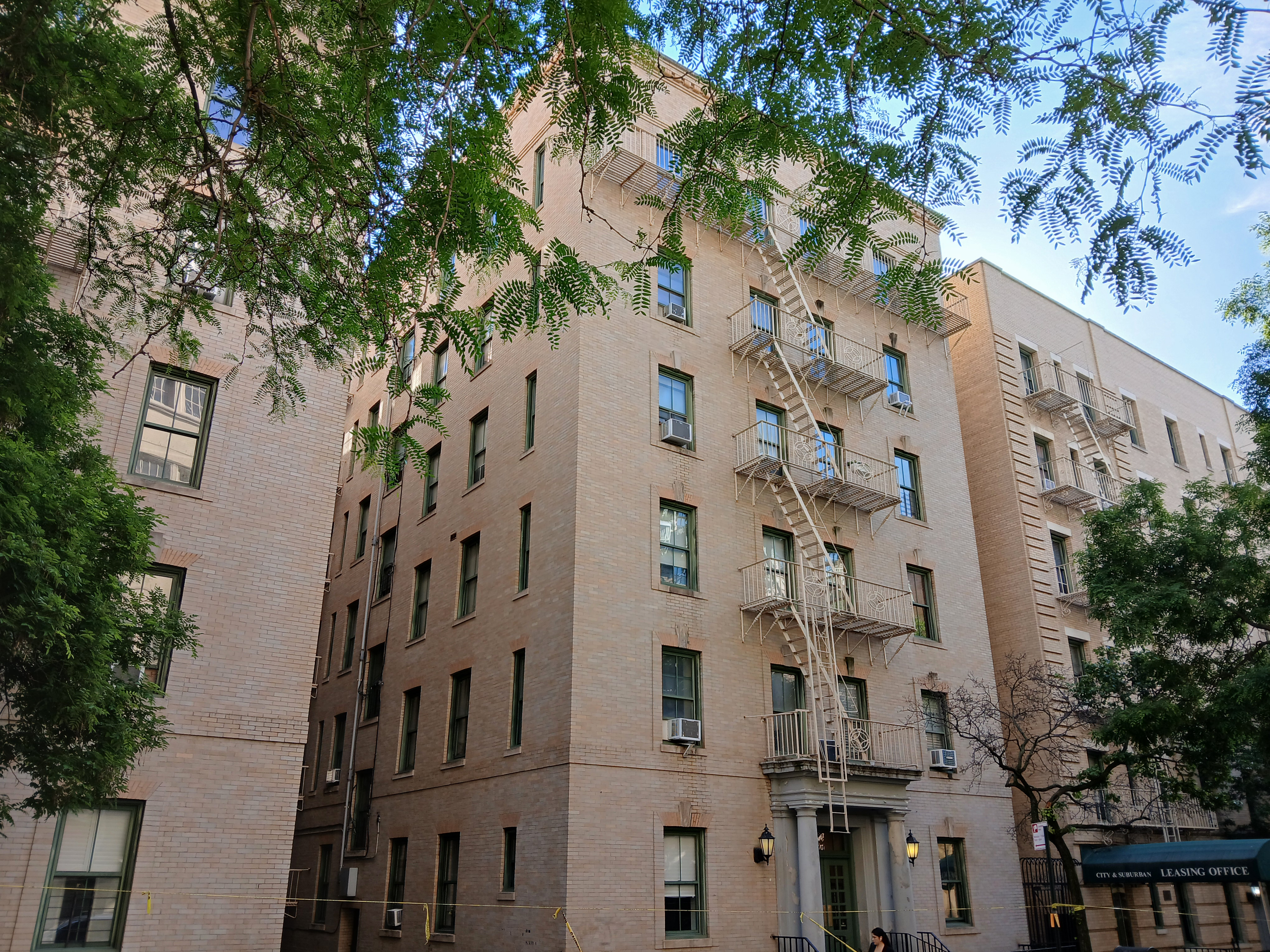
503–509 East 78th Street, one of the Griffin buildings

1470 York Avenue (a.k.a. 501 East 78th Street) and 1472 York Avenue (a.k.a. 502 East 79th Street) are mirror images of each other. Designed by Harde & Short, the two York Avenue buildings incorporate elements from both the original First Avenue Estate buildings and a competition design drawn up by Richard Thomas Short, one of the firm's principal architects. Both are six-story tenements, with floors divided horizontally (from bottom to top) in 2-3-1 configurations. The lowest section has tan brick, and the upper two sections have paler brick with tan-brick detailing. Although all stories have stone windowsills and lintels, the lintels in the lowest and highest sections are splayed, projecting outward. Both buildings have central and side courts along with ground-story storefronts. The ground-story entrances are flanked by Tuscan pilasters, each supporting an entablature, while the upper stories have wrought iron fire escapes. Over the years, the cornices have been removed and the storefronts modernized.

504–508 East 79th Street and 503–509 East 78th Street, designed by Percy Griffin, have identical layouts and incorporate Georgian Revival design features. They are the only buildings in the complex without central courtyards; Griffin had believed that an enclosed courtyard would be damp and uncomfortable. Instead, they have U-shaped layouts with the courtyard open to the street, visually dividing these buildings in two. Railings surround areaways in front of either building. The facades both have Tuscan-columned entry porticoes, along with neoclassical roundels on their wrought-iron fire escapes. 503–509 East 78th Street is divided in a 1-4-1 configuration from bottom to top. There is a protruding brick band above the first floor and a brick cornice or belt course above the sixth story. The brick-framed windows have both splayed lintels and stone keystones above. 504–508 East 79th Street is similar in design, except that the windows are grouped.

510–512 East 79th Street and 511–515 East 78th Street, designed by Philip Ohm, are nearly identical, except that only 510–512 East 79th Street includes a vehicle entrance. Railings surround areaways in front of either building. Both buildings have pale-yellow brick facades, with rusticated first floors and vertical quoins on the upper stories. The resident entrances have large garland-shaped brackets and stylized cartouches. The windowsills and lintels are made of stone and are simple in design. Both buildings had cornices that have since been removed.

==== Central buildings ====
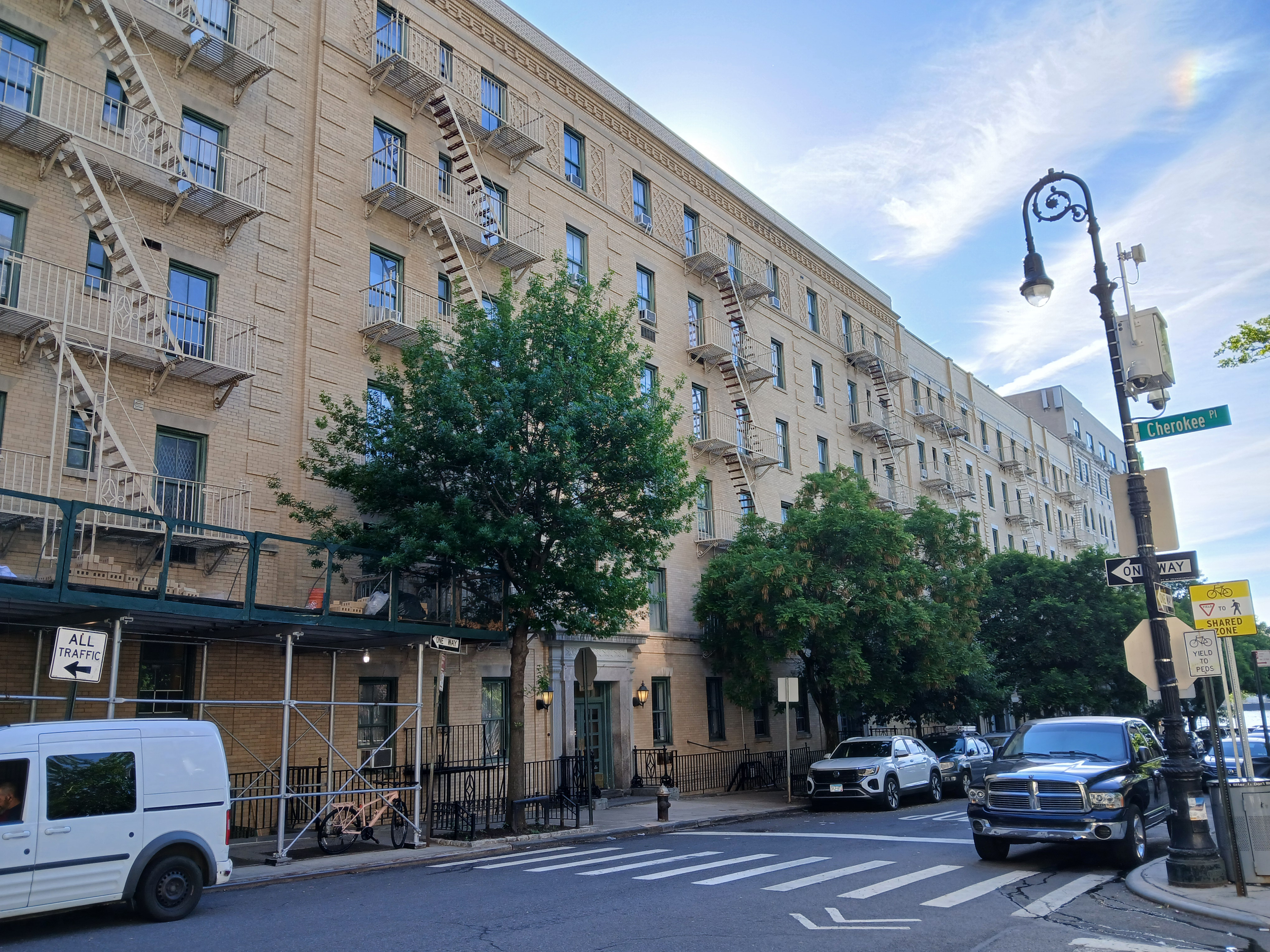
527–531 (left) and 535–535 (right) East 78th Street

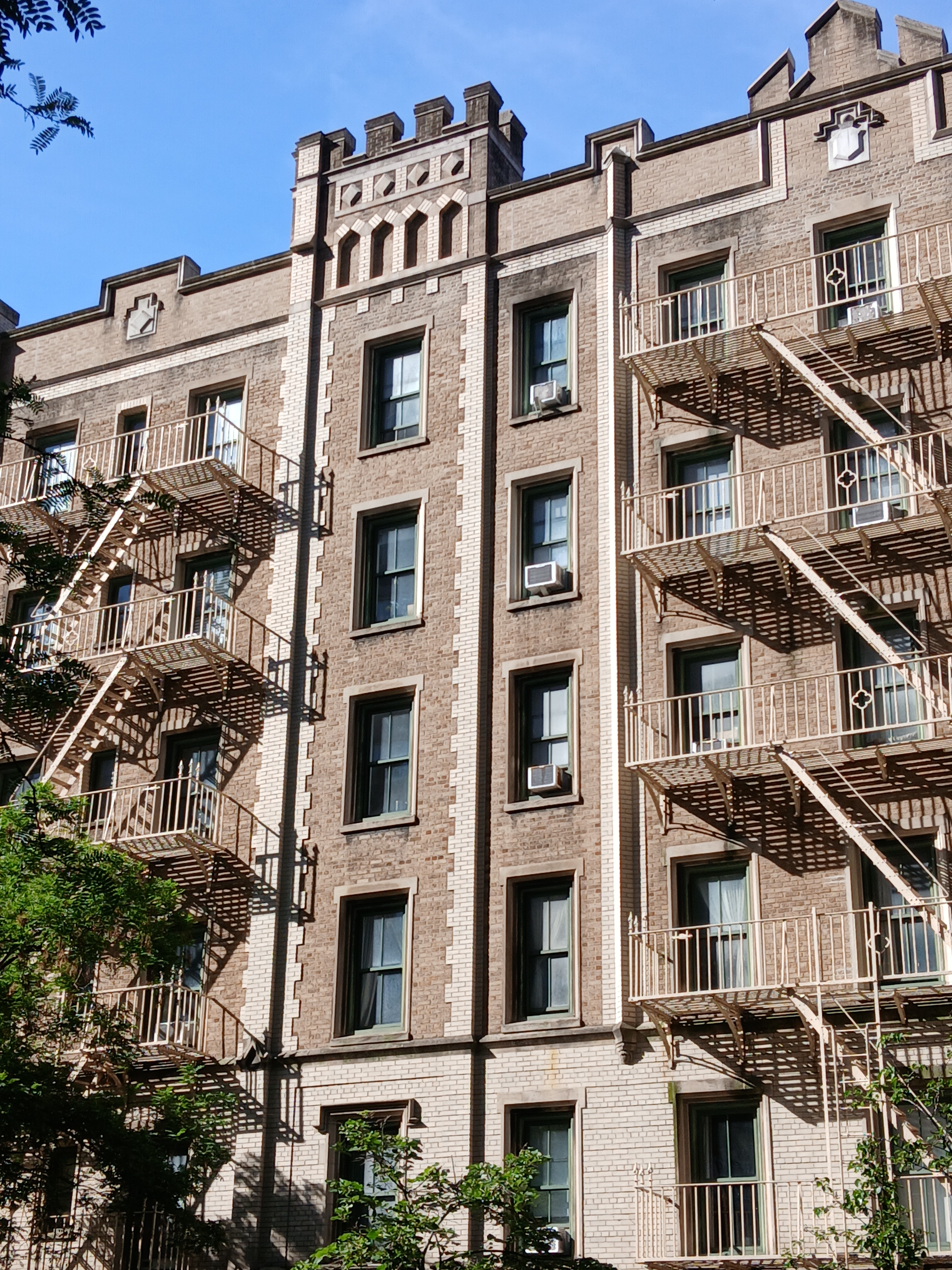
Detail of the Potter Memorial buildings at 512–524 East 79th Street

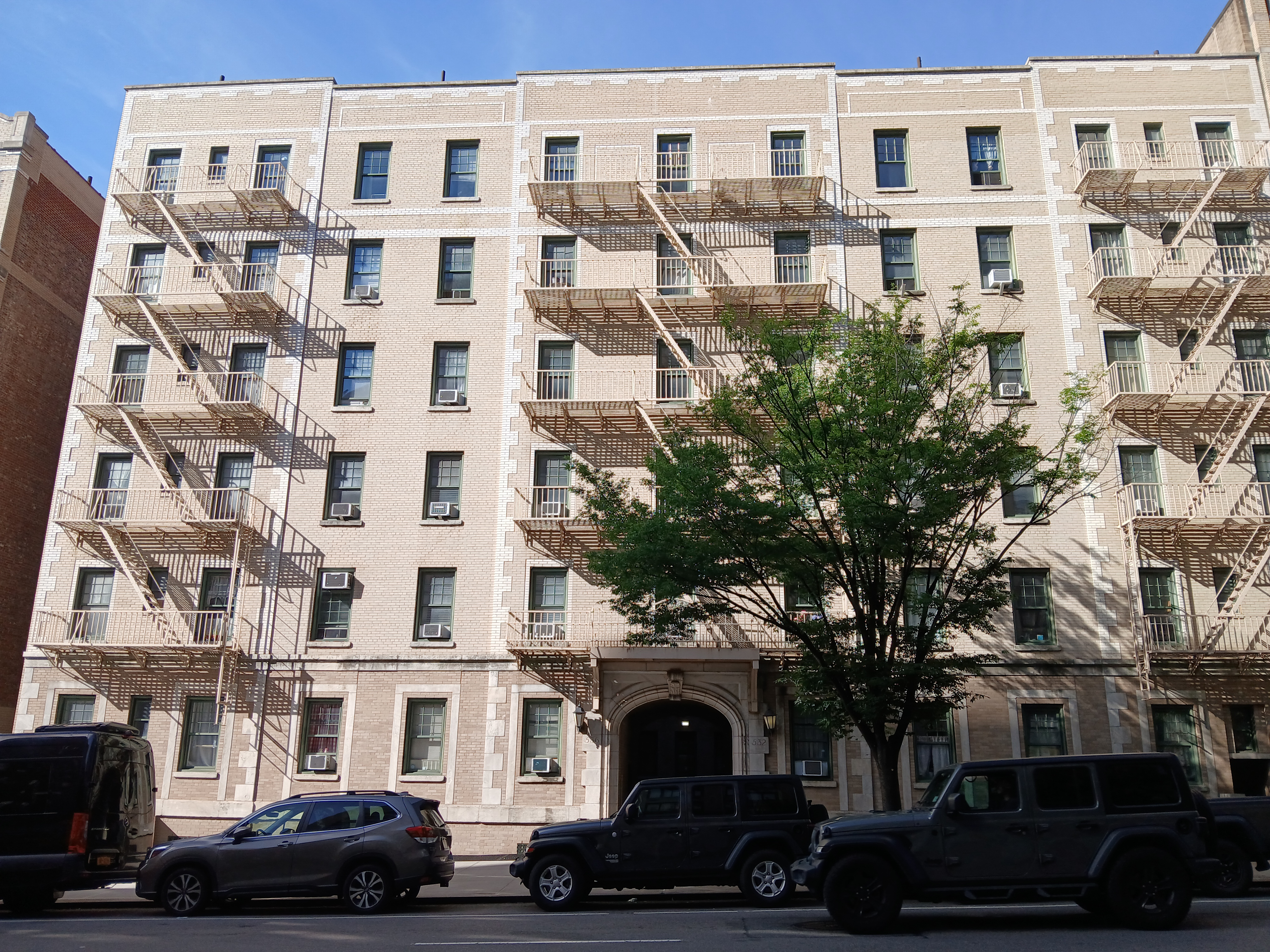
Passageway at 530–534 and 536–540 East 79th Street

519–523 and 527–531 East 78th Street, also designed by Ohm, adjoin 511–515 East 78th Street to the east. Numbers 519–523 and 527–531 have similar layouts and floor plans to numbers 510–512 and 511–515, except for the staircase layout. The buildings have pale-yellow or tan brick facades, with vertical groupings of protruding brick panels. The areaway railings have finials shaped like urns. The entrances are flanked by Tuscan half-pilasters supporting a molded frieze. On the upper stories are horizontal stone courses, ornamented wrought-iron fire escapes, and splayed keystones. There are diaperwork patterns between the sixth-floor windows. Cornices made of brick and terracotta run atop the roofs of both buildings.

Immediately north of these are the Bishop Potter Memorial buildings at 516–520 and 524–528 East 79th Street, designed by Ohm and built in honor of Episcopal bishop Henry Codman Potter. These buildings have more ornate decorations than the others because they were funded by an endowment, and they use darker brick. The wall of one building has a plaque memorializing Potter. The areaway railing has Gothic pinnacles, pointed arches, trefoils, and quatrefoils. The lowest two stories are made of tan brick and are rusticated, giving the impression of horizontal bands. The entrances have quatrefoils and pointed arches, while the lintels on the second floor have drip moldings. The upper four stories have brown-brick facades with buttresses, tan quoins, and wrought iron fire escapes, while the roofline has shields and rooftop crenellations.

535–539 East 78th Street, also designed by Ohm, is immediately east of numbers 519–523 and 527–531, with a similar design to these two buildings. Number 535–539 has a tan facade with vertical rusticated brick bands, and it has a wrought-iron fire escape. The windows have splayed lintels, except for those in the same bay as the entrance, which have ornate stone frames. The sixth-floor windows have splayed lintels with keystones, and there are belt courses both below and above that level.

530–534 and 536–540 East 79th Street, a.k.a. 532 and 536 East 79th Street, was designed by Ohm; it has a round-arched passage with a ceiling vault, leading to a shared courtyard with four stairs. The courtyard facade is made of brick with stone facades, along with pediments at the entrance to each stair. The courtyard also has benches. On the exterior facade, tan brick, light quoins, stone frames, and decorative fire escapes are used, and there is a tan-brick parapet on the roofline.

==== Eastern buildings ====
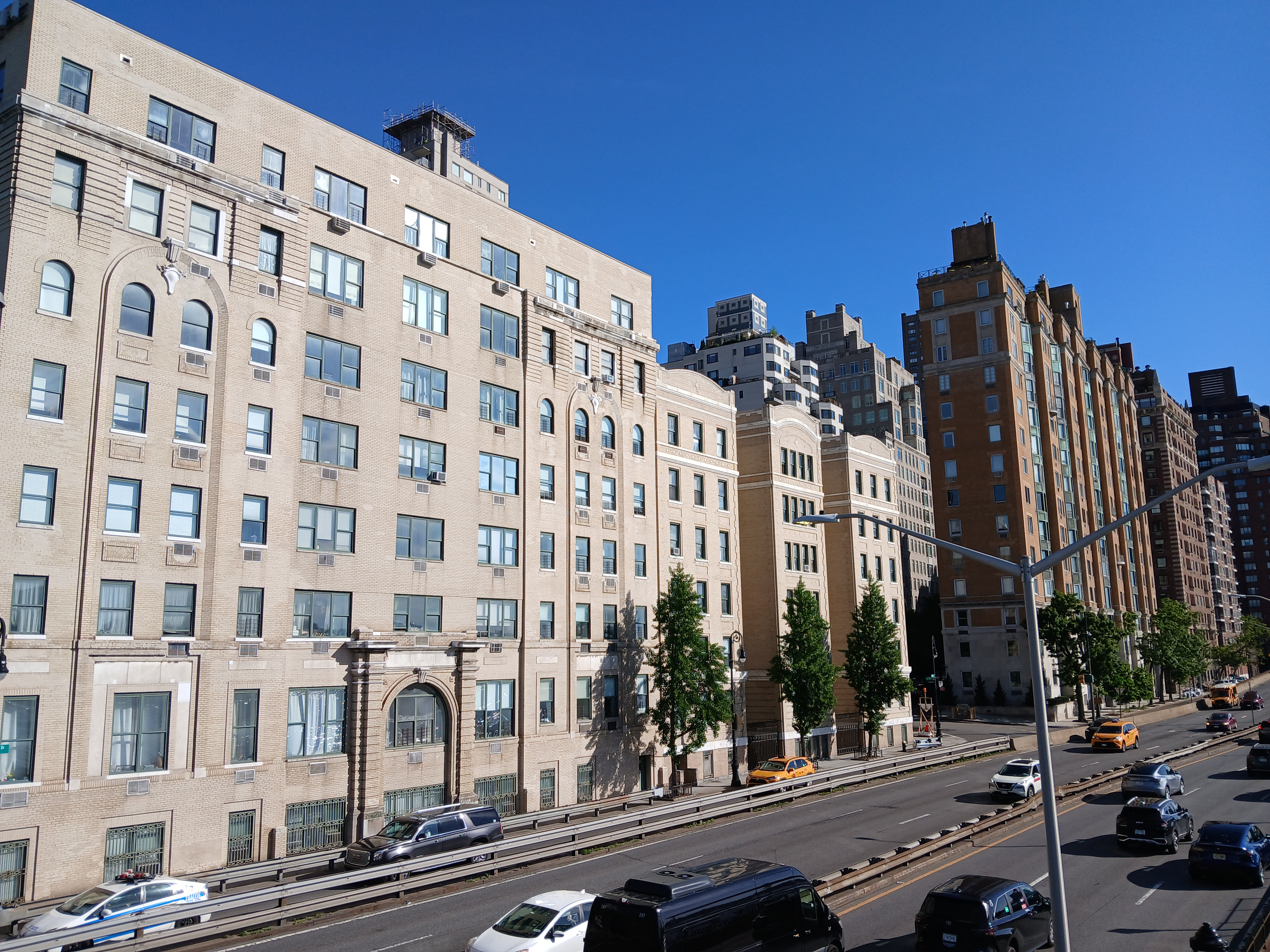
The easternmost buildings (Junior League Hotel at left and the Cutting Memorial Building at center right), seen from 78th Street over FDR Drive

541 East 78th Street, a.k.a. the Junior League Hotel or East End Hotel, is at the complex's southeastern corner. It is built of tan brick with marble trim. The Junior League Hotel was originally a seven-story hotel containing a roof garden with a pergola, along with various balconies facing the East River. An eighth story was added when the building was converted to luxury apartments around 1980; at that time, the interior courtyard and original East River entrance were infilled. Prior to the 1980s reconfiguration, the main ground-story entrance on FDR Drive was through a double-height arch with rusticated piers. The outermost four bays on either side were separate wings, with a court between them, and were connected by balconies across each court. Each wing on FDR Drive has four-story arches, with panels below each window and a keystone and cartouche atop each arch; similar arches face 78th Street. The fifth-floor windows are round-arched, while the other floors' windows are rectangular. The original details remain intact aside from the pergola and balconies.

542 East 79th Street, a.k.a. the William Bayard Cutting Memorial Building, is at the complex's northeastern corner and was the most recent of the buildings to be constructed. The building's namesake was a cofounder of the City and Suburban Homes Company; he is memorialized by a plaque on the exterior. Unlike the others in the estate, the Cutting Memorial Building has a trapezoidal massing and light courts on FDR Drive. Both of the exterior elevations are made of tan brick with stone trim and have decorations such as quoins, recessed panels, and stone courses. The exterior elevation also has herringbone and rhombus-shaped inserts. The entrance is through a round-arched passageway with a keystone and segmentally-arched pediment above it. This leads to a courtyard with stairways at each corner, accessed by canopies with iron brackets. The courtyard itself has a light-tinted brick facade, with motifs such as soldier brick and rhombus-shaped inserts. The courtyard facade has windows next to the stairwells, which open into the bathrooms.

=== Interior ===
Some of the buildings have fireproof entrance lobbies with marble or tile floors and plaster walls, in addition to stairs with iron railings. Other buildings have open stairs leading directly to the upper floors. The York Avenue buildings have storefronts at their ground levels.

When the York Avenue Estate was completed, the buildings cumulatively had 1,254, 1,256, or 1,257 units. In contrast to traditional tenements with cramped layouts, the York Avenue Estate apartments are only two rooms deep; each room faced either the street or an interior courtyard. The Junior League Hotel was built with both small apartments and single rooms; most of the hotel's 102 apartments had two or three rooms. Within the rest of the estate, each apartment has two to five rooms, all with windows. For privacy, the apartments have private entrance foyers separating the hallway and living spaces; separate restrooms; doors between rooms; and soundproof walls. The units also have steam heating and gas ranges. Tiles are also used in the complex's partitions and floors for fireproofing purposes, while stairs and air shafts were enclosed to prevent fires from spreading into them.

There are storage areas in the basements. The first buildings in the York Avenue Estate originally lacked in-unit showers, except in the largest apartments, forcing residents to use communal showers on the lower floors. In Harde & Short's buildings on York Avenue, only the larger apartments originally had private bathrooms. Ohm's initial buildings (510–512 East 79th and 511–515, 519–523 and 527–531 East 78th) also had bathrooms and playrooms in their basements and first floors, along with ground-floor halls and rooftop clotheslines. With the completion of the final buildings, City and Suburban Homes did incorporate showers into all the apartments. The Junior League Hotel also had communal rooms such as sitting and dining rooms; its main floor included two parlors, a library, and several smaller parlors, and the basement had amenity spaces such as a laundry. Some of the hotel's original parlors were "beau parlors" where women could meet with male guests.

== History ==
The site had been reserved for the New York Protestant Episcopal School in the 18th century but remained unused into the following century. By the 1880s, most of New York City's residents lived in 90,000 tenement buildings, which were generally overcrowded and prone to disease. These tenements generally occupied constrained, 25-by-100-foot (7.6 by 30.5 m) rectangular land lots, with narrow light courts on either side of a dumbbell-shaped plan. A New York state government committee studied ways to improve tenement house designs in 1894, and an architectural design competition, for square tenements on 200-by-400-foot (61 by 122 m) sites, was hosted two years later. The City and Suburban Homes Company was organized in July 1896 to construct the winning designs from that competition. Three finalists were to design the company's first three projects. City and Suburban's investors agreed to limit any profits they received from the developments. E. R. L. Gould of City and Suburban called this financial structure a "middle ground between pure philanthropy and pure business".

=== Development ===
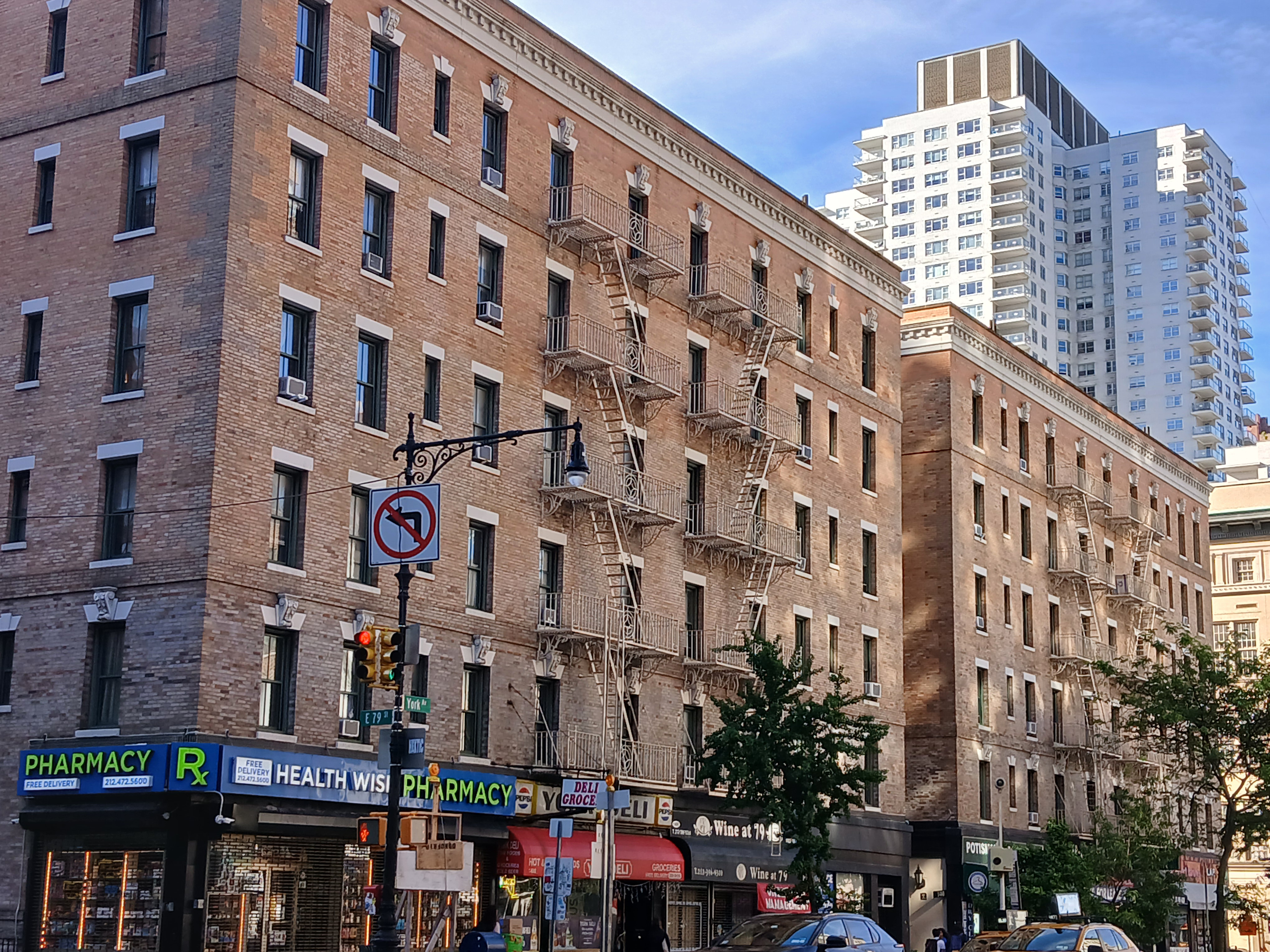
View of buildings on York Avenue, the first to be developed

The first buildings were constructed at the western end of the block, facing York Avenue (then known as Avenue A). In May 1901, City and Suburban bought the westernmost section of the block bounded by Avenue A, 78th and 79th streets, and the East River. This assemblage consisted of 18 lots and extended about 223 feet (68 m) east of York Avenue. The site, selected for its proximity to PS 158 and the future John Jay Park, was described as "admirable in every way". Harde & Short, which had won a 1900 design competition for six-story tenements, was hired to draw up plans for the York Avenue buildings, plans for which were filed in August 1901. Work on these buildings took place between February 1902 and 1903. The next pair of buildings to be constructed was at 504–508 East 79th Street and 503–509 East 78th Street immediately to the east, designed by Percy Griffin, who had been the third-place finisher in the 1900 design competition. Plans for Griffin's buildings were filed in April 1902.

The rest of the block was purchased in April or June 1905. After the Harde & Short and Griffin buildings had been completed, Philip Ohm filed plans for eight of the buildings in 1906. These buildings were placed adjacent to each other, with side and central courts, in addition to public halls, and each accommodated 90 families. By 1907, the Avenue A Estate had 454 families living there, two-thirds of whom had been existing residents of Manhattan north of 59th Street. Plans were filed for 519–523 and 527–531 East 78th Street in March 1908 and for 535–539 East 78th Street in October 1908. City and Suburban Homes also invited the Junior League to build a structure at the York Avenue Estate in 1909, and they raised $260,000, obtaining a site at 78th Street and the East River. By 1910, a hundred more apartments on 78th Street had been finished, and the Junior League building was also underway. The New York Times wrote that, with the Avenue A Estate's construction, City and Suburban Homes had "set a high standard for the erection of similar houses by other organizations and building operators".

Ohm filed plans for two additional buildings on 79th Street in April 1909. These were known as the Bishop Potter Memorial Buildings, a pair of tenements on 79th Street honoring Episcopal bishop Henry C. Potter, which were funded by a $350,000 endowment (equivalent to $8,209,000 in 2024). The Potter buildings were opened in 1911 and dedicated on April 17, 1912; these added another 200 apartments to the complex. By then, the complex had 1,041 families living there, and a survey of one-third of these families found that their weekly salaries were, on average, below $16 (equivalent to $534 in 2025). Also in 1912, City and Suburban Homes bought the remaining portion of the block, facing the East River, and Ohm's buildings at 530–534 and 536–540 East 79th Street were completed. By then, urban planners no longer saw the central courts as efficient; one planner estimated that the space occupied by the Avenue A Estate's light courts could have instead accommodated 100 more apartments. The William Bayard Cutting Memorial Building at 542 East 79th Street, the final building on the block, was constructed in 1913.

=== Late 1910s to 1970s ===
When completed, the York Avenue Estate was advertised as the largest group of model tenements in the United States or the largest such complex ever built. At the time, it had just over 1,250 apartments; a US federal report called it "the largest individual low-rent housing project in the world". The thirteen apartment blocks recorded a return of investment of 4% and attracted a wide variety of low- or moderate-income tenants, such as secretaries, clerical staff, and mechanics. The Junior League Hotel was leased out to single women. City and Suburban Homes acquired the adjacent Cherokee Apartments in 1924, operating the Cherokee Apartments and Avenue A Estate as separate properties. The area surrounding the York Avenue Estate had few luxury apartment complexes until the late 1920s, when the private Chapin School opened, prompting additional residential development in the area.

The section of York Avenue between 71st and 90th streets, including the Avenue A (York Avenue) Estate, was rezoned in 1930 for exclusively residential use. In 1933, City and Suburban took full ownership of the struggling Junior League Hotel, which became the East End Hotel for Women. City and Suburban Homes continued to develop buildings until the 1940s, when World War II resulted in material shortages, although it held on to the York Avenue Estate; the company continued to be profitable into the next decade. By then, many but not all of the buildings in the estate were fully occupied. The building at 1472 York Avenue was damaged in 1943 by a gas explosion that killed one resident. Later in the decade, multiple buildings in the estate were renovated, including 527–531 East 78th Street (1946); 511–515 and 519–523 East 78th Street (1947); 532 and 536 East 79th Street (1948); and 504–508 East 79th Street and 503–509 East 78th Street (1949).

City and Suburban received a $5 million mortgage loan on the First Avenue and York Avenue estates in 1950. Early that decade, the City and Suburban Homes Company converted 200 of the apartments in the York Avenue Estate to private units for elderly residents. These units (also incorporated into some of the First Avenue Estate buildings) were finished in 1953. They included various design features for increased accessibility, such as lower furniture, larger closets, electric stoves, non-slip surfaces, and stoves. In 1961, the Diversified Management Corporation, operated by the Scheuer family, bought City and Suburban Homes' stock. The Scheuers thus took over the York Avenue Estate, owning it for two decades.

=== 1980s to present ===
==== Redevelopment and landmark dispute ====
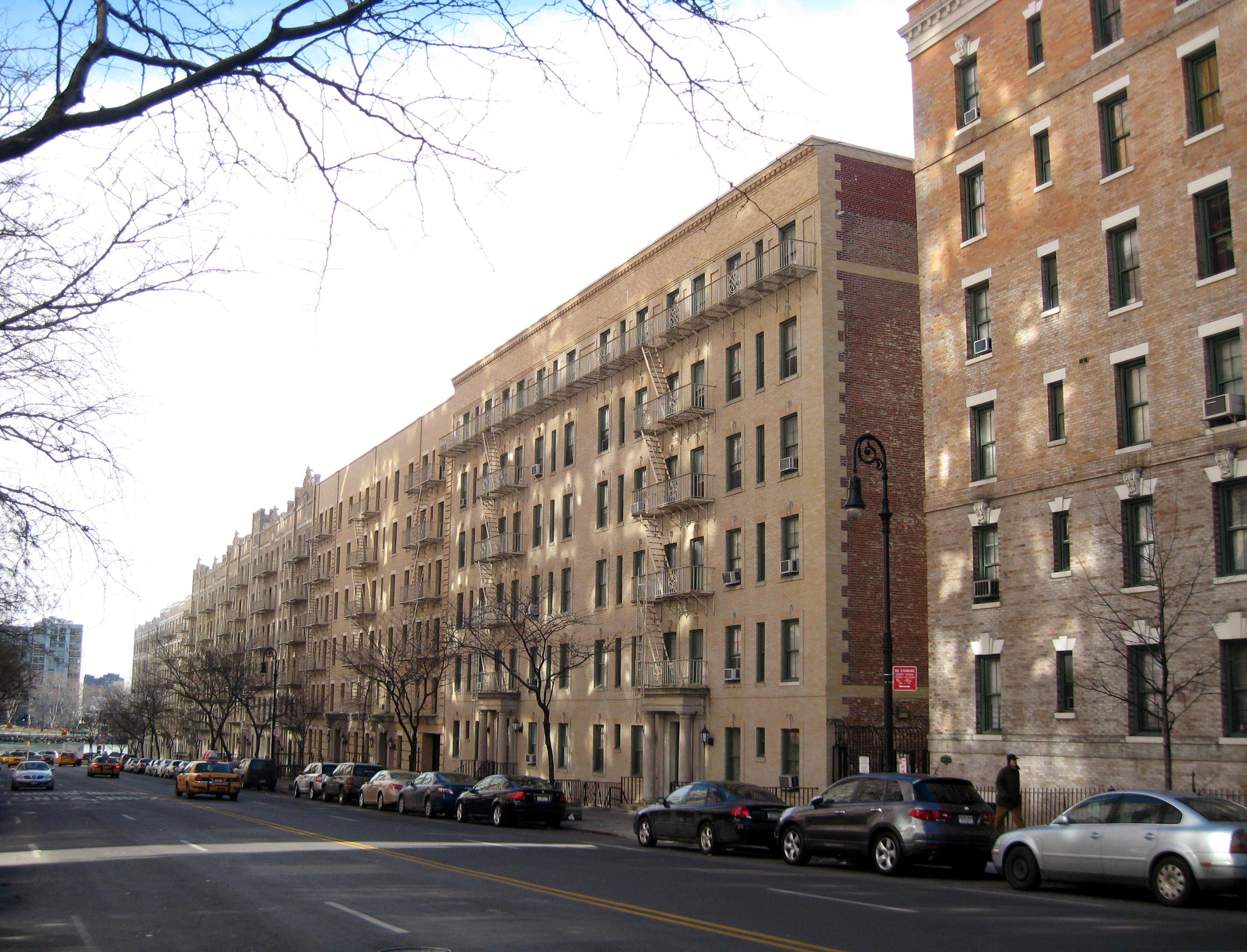
View eastward on 79th Street

In 1985, the developer Peter Kalikow bought the buildings from the Scheuer family for $43 million. Kalikow took out a $30 million mortgage loan to pay for his purchase. He initially announced plans to raze the entire complex. The New York City Landmarks Preservation Commission (LPC) agreed to consider designating the buildings as landmarks in February 1985, and tenants hired a lawyer to fight the demolition. Kalikow, wishing to redevelop the site before a landmark designation could be granted, issued eviction notices to over 1,200 tenants that April, the largest attempted eviction of rent-regulated tenants in New York City history. At the time, apartments in neighboring buildings regularly sold for $1 million (equivalent to $2,500,000 in 2024), but rents in the York Avenue Estate buildings averaged $300 a month (equivalent to $898 in 2025). After objections to the evictions arose, Kalikow instead offered to buy out the tenants. He also revised his plans so that only four or six of the easternmost buildings would be demolished, including the apartments in the East End Hotel.

Disputes over the buildings continued; the New York Daily News wrote in 1988 that "Kalikow is despised and feared by tenants" of the York Avenue Estate. The disputes over the buildings became a major issue in the city's tenant rights movement. That February, Kalikow announced plans for a 81-story tower near FDR Drive, prompting further protests. By then, half of the easternmost buildings had been vacated, and residents claimed that Kalikow was trying to empty out the buildings by waiting until tenants died, then nailing the apartment doors shut. The holdouts included many elderly residents who did not accept Kalikow's buyout offers. Local activist Betty Cooper Wallerstein formed a coalition of 200 local groups that sought to have the buildings designated as city landmarks. The preservation effort became the Coalition to Save City and Suburban Homes, which wished to prevent any part of the complex from being demolished. In late 1988, the LPC agreed to host hearings on the feasibility of designating the York Avenue Estate as a city landmark.

The complex was designated by the LPC on April 24, 1990, despite Kalikow's opposition. The LPC made the designation concurrently with that of the First Avenue Estate, which was only partially protected because of opposition from its owner Stahl York Avenue. Both the First Avenue and York Avenue estates had been designated because of their significance in helping "to address the housing needs of the working poor". Kalikow's lawyer described the York Avenue Estate designation as a "blatant abuse of the landmark law" and vowed to appeal the designation with the New York City Board of Estimate. In August 1990, the Board of Estimate revoked landmark designation from the easternmost four buildings, but approved the designations of the rest of the complex. The board dissolved itself shortly after approving the designation, leaving a 40,000-square-foot (3,700 m^{2}) portion of the York Avenue Estate vulnerable to redevelopment. By September 1990, Kalikow's firm was planning to construct a 45-story skyscraper on the East River portion of the site. Preservationists continued to oppose his efforts to redevelop any part of the estate, and they planned to sue over the four buildings' de-designations. Even so, Kalikow had managed to buy out 700 of the tenants by that year, having paid them up to $12,000 each; however, none of the six easternmost tenements had been fully vacated.

==== Bankruptcy sale and later years ====
Kalikow filed for bankruptcy in 1991. By then, he had taken out two new mortgages on the complex totaling $60 million; he had not paid back his older $30 million mortgage, and the buildings did not generate enough rental income to cover this amount. In 1992, the New York Supreme Court, Appellate Division, unanimously forbade the construction of the proposed East River skyscraper, stating that Kalikow had not demonstrated sufficient financial hardship, and Kalikow's mortgage lender Chemical Bank began foreclosure proceedings on the ten landmarked buildings. By then, a local group had listed the complex as one of the neighborhood's most endangered buildings. Although the Appellate Division rejected a New York City Council request to review the designation and de-designation of the easternmost buildings, these buildings regained city landmark status the same year. To resolve the bankruptcy proceedings, Kalikow agreed to relinquish ownership of the York Avenue Estate.

Another developer, 78/79 York Associates, bought both parts of the estate in 1993 and 1994 for a combined $31 million; this group was operated by Stanley Wasserman Co.. The new owners canceled Kalikow's plans to redevelop the four easternmost buildings, which at the time had 100 tenants, while the remainder of the complex had 1,200–1,500 tenants. The buildings were also added to the National Register of Historic Places in 1994. The Wassermans renovated the buildings and upgraded the utility systems, raising rents to pay for these renovations. The upgrades were completed in 2000 and were generally positively received by residents. By the early 21st century, the buildings were nearly fully occupied.

== Impact and legacy ==
The American Institute of Architects' New York chapter gave the Potter Memorial buildings an honorable mention for exterior design in 1911. When the buildings were considered for landmark designation, The New York Times wrote that the complex was "far from grand" yet influential in the urban planning field, and that the Potter Memorial buildings were the most architecturally distinctive. City and Suburban's estates helped influence the layouts and configurations of later low-income housing developments, including those built by labor unions or the federal government, although these structures (such as Harlem River Houses or First Houses) lacked the decorative details of the City and Suburban estates. Photographs of the York Avenue Estate were displayed in 1989 as part of a traveling exhibit, A Dream Fulfilled: City and Suburban's York Avenue Estate, and a book of the same name by Joe Vesti was published in 1988.

== See also ==
- List of New York City Designated Landmarks in Manhattan from 59th to 110th Streets
- National Register of Historic Places listings in Manhattan from 59th to 110th Streets
- Celtic Park (Queens), another City and Suburban Homes development

== Sources ==
- City and Suburban Homes Company, Avenue A (York Avenue) Estate (PDF) (Report). New York City Landmarks Preservation Commission. April 24, 1990.
- National Register of Historic Places Inventory/Nomination: City and Suburban Homes Company's York Avenue Estate and Shively Sanitary Tenements Historic District (PDF) (Report). National Park Service. June 18, 1986.
