= East River Homes =

East River Homes and East River Houses may refer to:

- Cherokee Apartments, formerly the East River Homes and the Shively Sanitary Tenements, on the Upper East Side of Manhattan
- Cooperative Village§East River Housing Corporation, on the Lower East Side of Manhattan
- East River Houses, 10 buildings, in East Harlem, Manhattan
