= Henry L. Shively =

Henry L. Shively (4 June 1864 - 1960) was an American physician, in charge of the tuberculosis clinic at the Presbyterian Hospital in New York, and was visiting physician at the St Joseph's Hospital for Consumptives. He observed that poor living conditions made some diseases worse in poor families. He was born in Wabash, Indiana to Lewis Shively of Ohio. He married Mary Westmore. The Shively Sanitary Tenements was his idea and initially named for him.

== Selected publications ==
- Shively, Henry L. (1 July 1909). "Sanitary tenements for tuberculous families" (PDF). British Journal of Tuberculosis. 3 (3): 193–196. doi:10.1016/S0366-0850(09)80047-1. ISSN 0366-0850.

== See also ==
- Association of Tuberculosis Clinics
