= John Jay Park =

Public park in Manhattan, New York

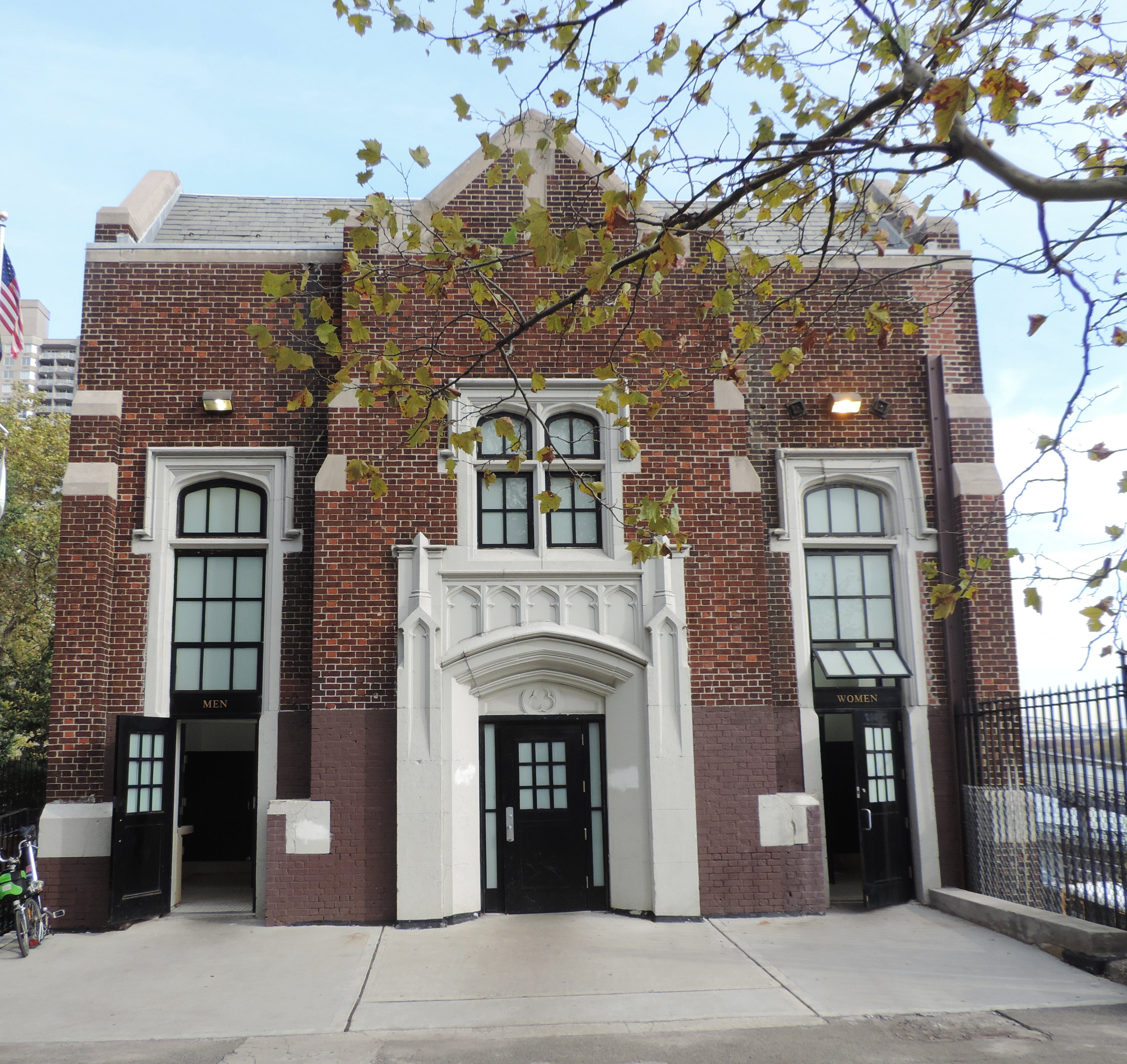
- Interactive map of John Jay Park
- Location: Upper East Side, Manhattan, New York City
- Coordinates: 40.7694°N 73.9496°W
- Area: 3.3-acre (13,000 m^{2})
- Website: nycgovparks.org/parks/johnjaypark

John Jay Park is a 3.3-acre (13,000 m^{2}) park in the New York City borough of Manhattan. It is located between East 76th and 78th Streets, and between the FDR Drive and a short street called Cherokee Place (opposite Cherokee Apartments), on Manhattan's Upper East Side. The park is named for statesman and New York Governor John Jay.

In 1902 the city acquired through condemnation a parcel of land at the site of the park and opened a public bath house in 1906. A swimming pool and promenade was built nearby from 1940 to 1942, part of a Work Projects Administration construction program. In 1941 the bath house was renovated to include an auditorium, recreation room, gym, and changing facility which could accommodate 1,002 male and 590 female bathers. In 2010, a substantial upgrade was completed on the bath house, allowing visitors who are disabled to have full access to the facilities.

A large playground occupies almost half of the park's total acreage. The remaining half has basketball courts, handball courts, tennis court, and the pool and bath house. The park is used for physical education classes by Eleanor Roosevelt High School, Lycée Français de New York, P.S. 158, and M.S. 177. It used to accommodate East Side Middle School students until the school moved further uptown.
