= James E. Ware =

American architect (1846–1918)

- Born: 1846; New York City, U.S.
- Died: April 14, 1918; New York City, U.S.
- Occupation: Architect
- Buildings: tenements
- Projects: City and Suburban Homes Company's First Avenue Estate; Maple Grove Cemetery

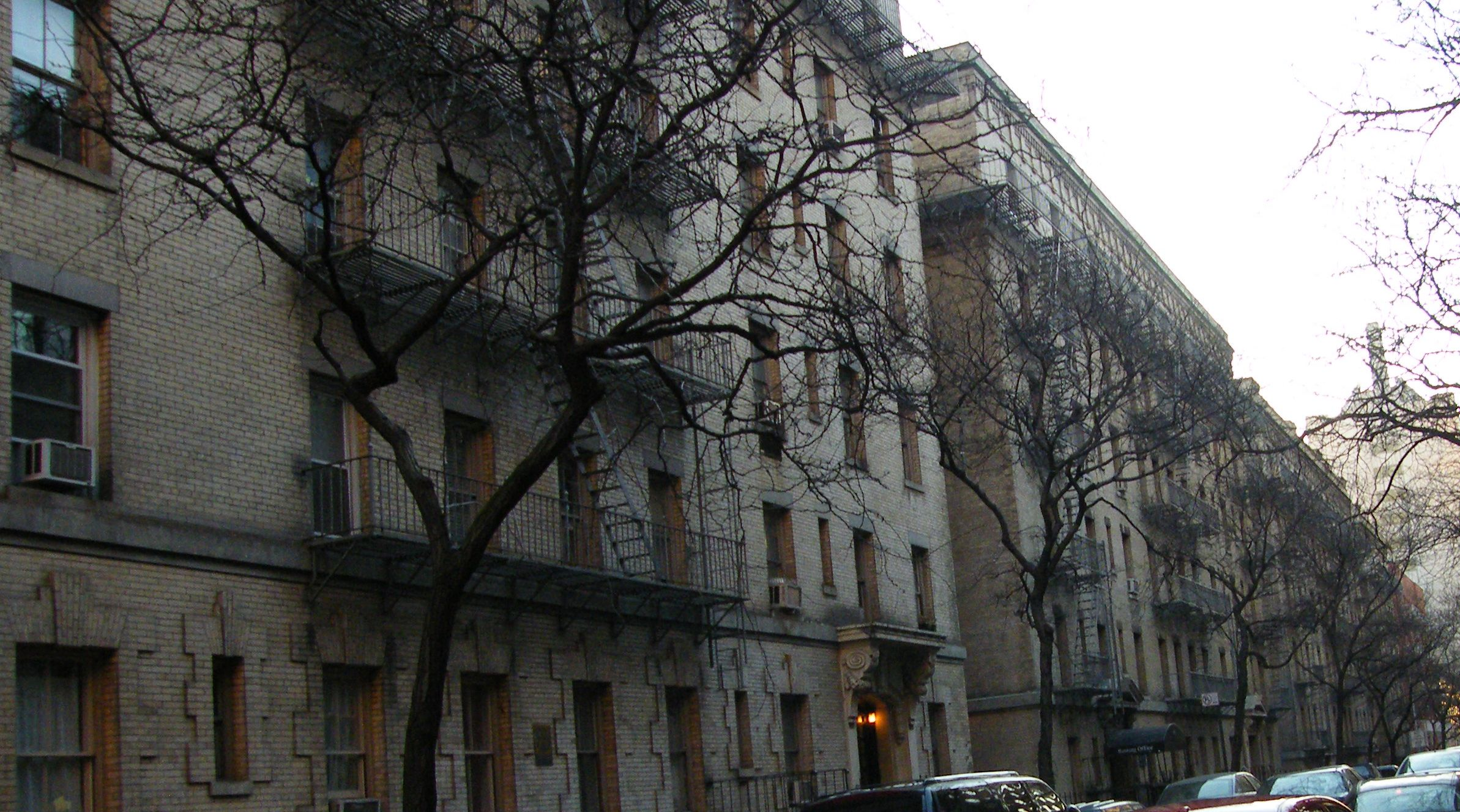
City & Suburban Homes First Avenue Estate

James Edward Ware (1846 – April 14, 1918) was an American architect, best known for devising the "dumbbell plan" for New York City tenement housing.

He was born in New York City in 1846, and studied at the City College of New York. He began his practice in 1869. His sons Franklin and Arthur were also architects and in 1900 formed the firm James E. Ware and Sons. His son Franklin B. Ware (1873–1945) served as New York State architect from 1907 to 1912.

Ware was an early designer of fireproof warehouses. He also achieved distinction as a designer of multiple dwellings and is best known for devising the "dumbbell plan" of tenement design for which he received recognition in 1878. He designed the Osborne Apartments and Bennett College in Millbrook, New York, as well as part of Mohonk Mountain House. He also designed a number of private residences in New Jersey and New York City and the interior of the Madison Avenue Presbyterian Church in 1891. Among his finest extant buildings is the row of Romanesque Revival houses at 1285-1293 Madison Avenue, on the corner of East 92nd Street, in New York City. Ware is buried in Maple Grove Cemetery in a gravesite he received in partial payment for designing the Administration Building and receiving vault.

While in practice with his sons, they designed City and Suburban Homes Company's First Avenue Estate, added to the National Register of Historic Places in 1986. They also designed dwelling that contribute to the Sagaponack Historic District.
