= First Avenue Estate =

Historic district in Manhattan, New York

- City and Suburban Homes Company's First Avenue Estate Historic District
- U.S. National Register of Historic Places
- U.S. Historic district
- New York State Register of Historic Places
- New York City Landmark
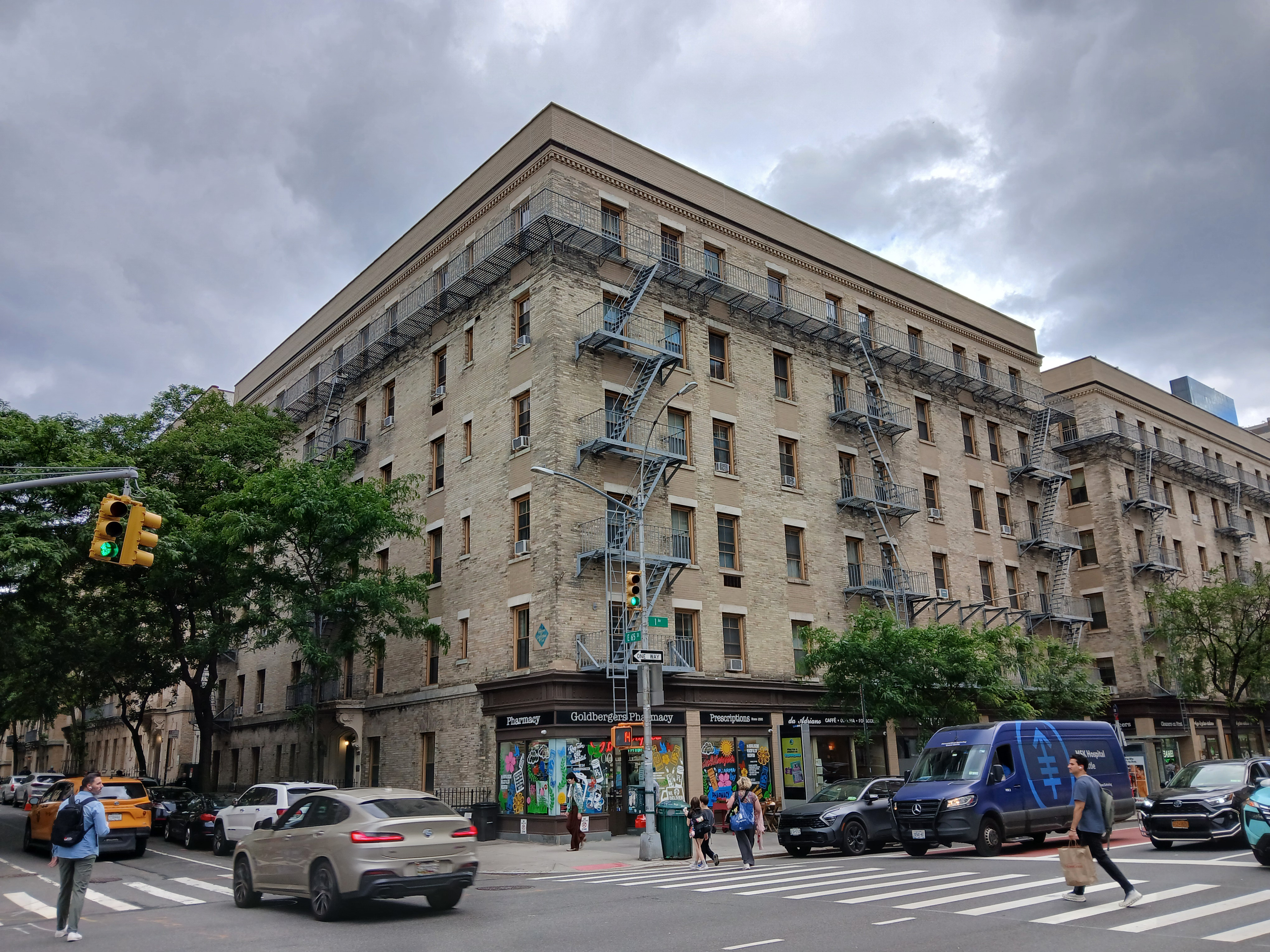

- Location within Manhattan Location within New York City Location within New York Location within the United States
- Location: 1168—1200 First Ave., 401—429 E. Sixty-fourth, and 402—430 E. Sixty-fifth Sts., Manhattan, New York, US
- Coordinates: 40°45′45″N 73°57′30″W
- Area: 2.8 acres (1.1 ha)
- Built: 1898
- Architect: James E. Ware & Sons; Philip Ohm
- Architectural style: Beaux Arts
- NRHP reference No.: 86002622
- NYCL No.: 1692

Significant dates
- Added to NRHP: August 1, 1986
- Designated NYSRHP: March 25, 1986
- Designated NYCL: April 24, 1990 (most of the buildings); November 21, 2006 (York Avenue buildings)

The First Avenue Estate is a historic district on the Upper East Side of Manhattan in New York City, New York, US. It includes a series of tenement buildings on a city block bounded by First Avenue, 65th Street, York Avenue, and 64th Street. The estate was the second development built by the City and Suburban Homes Company, a tenement developer. The estate was listed on the National Register of Historic Places (NRHP) in 1986 as the City and Suburban Homes Company's First Avenue Estate Historic District. It is also designated as a city landmark by the New York City Landmarks Preservation Commission (LPC).

James E. Ware designed most of the buildings (experimenting with various layout configurations), while Philip Ohm designed the remaining two. The buildings were constructed of light-colored brick and have masonry trim with Beaux-Arts details. The apartments have two to five rooms apiece, each with a window. They have private foyers and restrooms, doors separating different rooms, soundproof finishes, steam heating, gas ranges, and basement storage areas.

Part of the city block was previously occupied by the Colored Home and Hospital, acquired in 1897 by the City and Suburban Homes Company. Ware, a runner-up in an architectural design competition hosted by City and Suburban Homes, designed the first four phases of the complex between 1898 and 1906. The first buildings on First Avenue were completed in 1899 or 1900, and the next three phases were built farther eastward. A fifth phase on York Avenue, designed by Ohm, was finished in 1914. City and Suburban owned the buildings until 1961, when the company was bought out by the Diversified Management Corporation, operated by the Scheuer family. In 1977, Stahl York Avenue bought all the buildings. The LPC designated the complex as a landmark in 1990. Legal disputes led to two of the buildings losing their landmark status, then regaining it in 2006, a move that elicited over a decade of lawsuits; the designation was ultimately upheld in 2019.

== Description ==
The First Avenue Estate occupies an entire city block bounded by First Avenue to the west, 65th Street to the north, York Avenue to the east, and 64th Street to the south. It consists of 13 or 15 buildings. The complex was built in stages between 1898 and 1915. Most of the buildings were designed by James E. Ware, while two structures were designed by Philip Ohm. The First Avenue Estate was one of the oldest tenement projects developed by the City and Suburban Homes Company on Manhattan's Upper East Side, along with the York Avenue Estate farther north between 78th and 79th streets. The York and First Avenue estates were among a half-dozen full-block estates that the company built in Manhattan.

List of buildings (west to east)
Address / Name	Location	Completed	Architect	Ref.
1168–1190 First Avenue / 401 East 64th Street	Northeast corner of First Avenue and 64th Street	1898	James E. Ware	
1194–1200 First Avenue / 402 East 65th Street	Southeast corner of First Avenue and 65th Street	1898	James E. Ware	
403–409, 411, 415–417, 419–421, 423 East 64th Street	North side of 64th Street	1900	James E. Ware	
404–408, 410, 412, 414, 416 East 65th Street	South side of 65th Street	1900	James E. Ware	
429 East 64th Street	Northwest corner of York Avenue and 64th Street	1915	Philip Ohm	
430 East 65th Street	Southwest corner of York Avenue and 65th Street	1915	Philip Ohm	

=== Exterior ===
The buildings were constructed of yellow and tan brick, with masonry trim made of brick, stone, or terracotta. Beaux-Arts details such as cornices, large brackets, textured brick panels with geometric patterns, and garlands are commonalities across several of the buildings. For the most part, the buildings have similar details, floor plans, materials, and heights. Ware experimented with various layouts and design features in each building, resulting in subtle differences between the structures. The buildings occupy wide lots, providing space for courtyards both in the center and on the perimeter of each structure. Six of Ware's buildings have two entrances each, while the others have only one entrance. The complex was also built with roof gardens, which provided fresh air during the summer.

==== Building details ====
The two oldest buildings in the complex are at 1168–1190 First Avenue (at 64th Street) and 1194–1200 First Avenue (at 65th Street), both built in 1898. These buildings have tan brick facades. On the ground story, the First Avenue elevations have storefronts with metal entablatures. The side-street elevations have areaways behind fences; doorways with segmental arched stone frames and large cartouches; and with brick window frames detailed with quoins and splayed lintels. The upper stories have fire escapes, along with an iron balcony at the sixth story. The roof has a denticulated cornice beneath a brick rooftop parapet. As built, each of the First Avenue buildings had 79 apartments, each with two to four rooms.

Immediately to the east, Ware designed two square tenements at 403–409 East 64th Street and 404–408 East 65th Street, built in 1900. Similar in style to the First Avenue buildings, 403–409 East 64th and 404–408 East 65th both have areaways. The first floors of either building have raised-brick window frames and elaborate stone-framed doorways, the latter of which house recessed double doors. On the upper stories, the windows have lintels flush with the facade, and there are also a green terracotta band, iron balcony, denticulated cornice, parapet, and fire escape atop either building.

In the middle of the block are two groups of buildings, both of which contain interior courts and contiguous side yards. The first group, consisting of five buildings at 411–423 East 64th Street that are each 60 feet (18 m) wide, was built in 1901 on a 300-foot-wide (91 m) lot. The 64th Street buildings have yellow brickwork and are nearly identical to each other, aside from the absence of parapets above some of the buildings. The ground floors have areaways and granite-framed double doors, while the upper stories have stone belt courses, brick cornices, sixth-floor balconies, and fire escapes.

The second midblock group, consisting of four buildings at 410–416 East 65th Street that are each 75 feet (23 m) wide, was built in 1905–1906 and is also on a 300-foot-wide (91 m) lot. The 65th Street buildings also have yellow brickwork and are nearly identical to each other, aside from the absence of parapets above some of the buildings. The ground floors have areaways, granite-framed double doors, and windows with cartouches above. The upper stories have stone belt courses, brick cornices, sixth-floor balconies, and fire escapes.

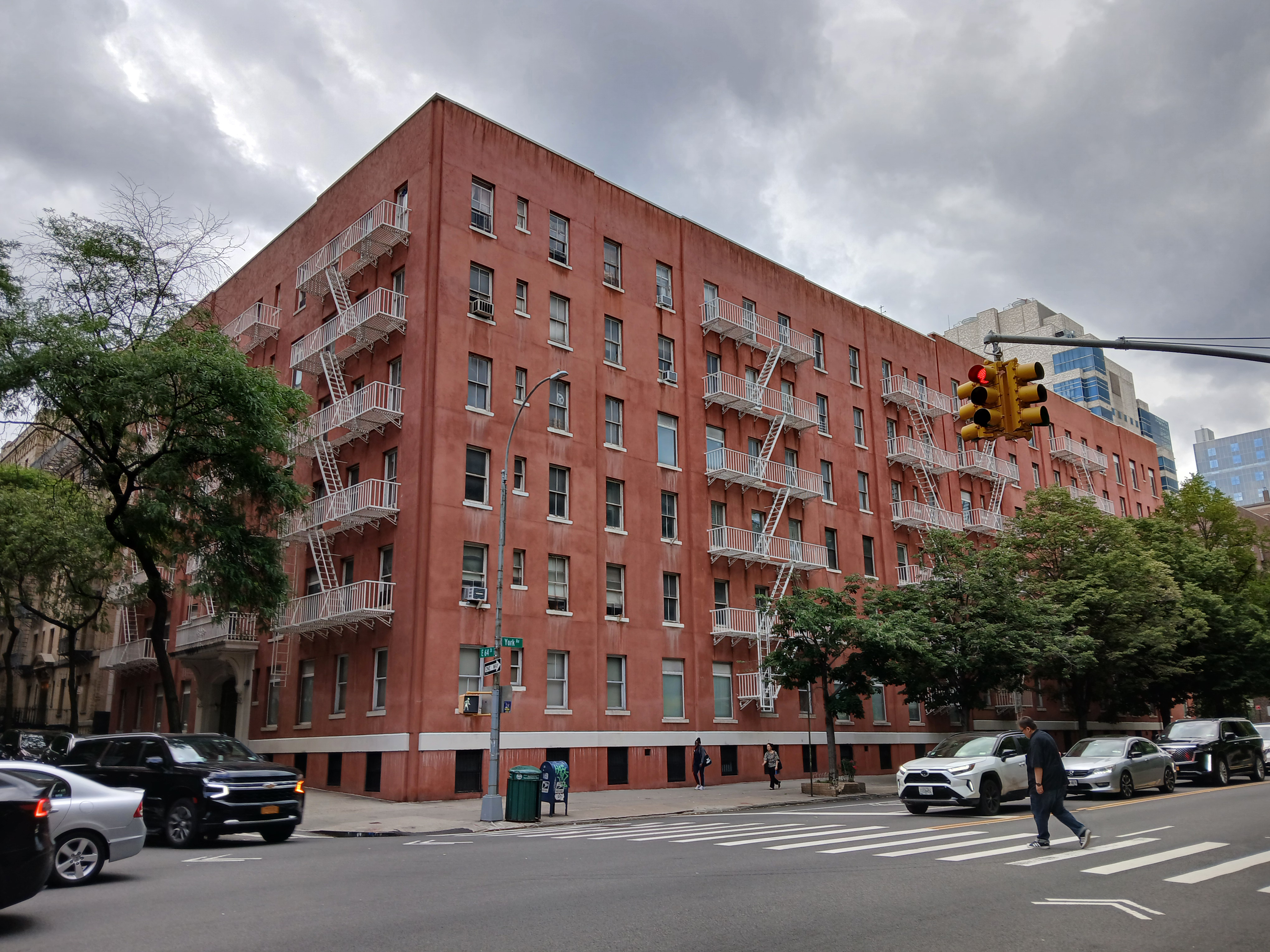
The York Avenue buildings

Ohm's two buildings, at 429 East 64th Street and 430 East 65th Street (facing York Avenue), are identical to each other. The street facades are simple, originally with similar masonry materials to Ware's buildings, although this was replaced with stucco in the 2000s. They have fire escapes, segmental-arched pediments at the roofline, brick-framed plaques, and stone roundels. The Ohm buildings are the only ones whose central courtyards are not fully enclosed; instead, the courtyards are accessed by elaborate archways from the street and contain stairways at each corner. The courtyard walls are of tan and yellow brick, the brickwork on the upper stories being darker. There are segmentally-arched porches with stone copings at the bases of each stair, which provide access into either building.

=== Interior ===
The buildings are one of the only examples in the US of full-block "light court" tenements, in which all apartments receive natural light from the external facade or an internal light court. Some of the buildings have fireproof entrance lobbies with marble or tile floors and plaster walls, in addition to stairs with iron railings. Other buildings have open stairs leading directly to the upper floors. The interior layouts let in more natural light than traditional narrow railroad apartment layouts.

The buildings cumulatively contain 1,059 apartments. In contrast to traditional tenements with cramped layouts, the First Avenue Estate apartments are only two rooms deep; each room faced either the street or an interior courtyard. Each apartment has two to five rooms, all with windows. For privacy, the apartments have private entrance foyers separating the hallway and living spaces; separate restrooms; doors between rooms; and soundproof walls. The units also have steam heating and gas ranges. Fireproof walls were built on the first story of each building, and on the upper stories between each apartment.

There are storage areas in the basements. The first buildings in the First Avenue Estate originally lacked in-unit showers, forcing residents to use communal showers on the lower floors. With the completion of the final buildings, City and Suburban Homes did incorporate showers into all the apartments.

== History ==
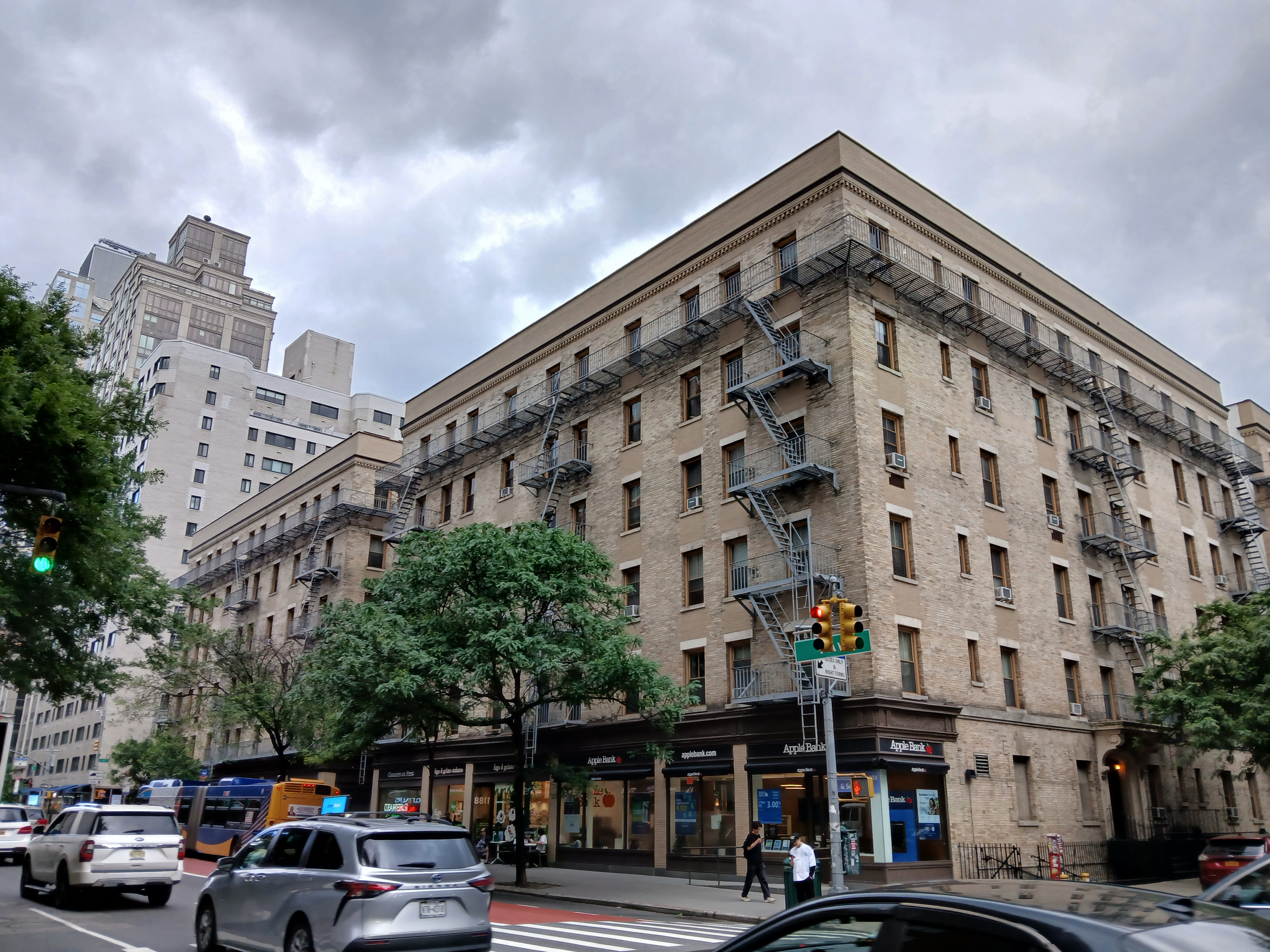
The buildings on First Avenue, the first in the complex to be completed

The western half of the city block was previously occupied by the Colored Home and Hospital, which built residences, a chapel, and several hospital facilities there in 1849. By the 1880s, most of New York City's residents lived in 90,000 tenement buildings, which were generally overcrowded and prone to disease. These tenements generally occupied constrained, 25-by-100-foot (7.6 by 30.5 m) rectangular land lots, with narrow light courts on either side of a dumbbell-shaped plan. A New York state government committee studied ways to improve tenement house designs in 1894, and an architectural design competition, for square tenements on 200-by-400-foot (61 by 122 m) sites, was hosted two years later. The City and Suburban Homes Company was organized in July 1896 to construct the winning designs from that competition. Three finalists were to design the company's first three projects. City and Suburban's investors agreed to limit any profits they received from the developments. E. R. L. Gould of City and Suburban called this financial structure a "middle ground between pure philanthropy and pure business".

=== Development ===
The First Avenue Estate was the second City and Suburban development, after a 373-unit complex on the Upper West Side opened in 1898. The design of the First Avenue Estate was assigned to James E. Ware, the second-place winner of the tenement competition. The City and Suburban Homes Company agreed in April 1897 to buy the Colored Home and Hospital site for $210,000. This assemblage consisted of 41 lots, extending 513 feet (156 m) east of First Avenue toward York Avenue (at the time part of Avenue A). The site, at the boundary of what was known as "Battle Row", was near the 65th Street/Second Avenue and 67th Street/Third Avenue elevated railway stations and several streetcar lines. To give the hospital time to move, the transaction was to be finalized after a one-year delay. The New York Times wrote that the transaction "has an interest for the whole community", saying the successful completion of the estate could influence similar developments elsewhere. The sale was completed in January 1898.

Plans for the first two buildings, facing First Avenue, were prepared by Ware, who submitted them to the Manhattan Bureau of Buildings in July 1898. These buildings had 148 apartments, with two to four rooms each. The First Avenue buildings were completed in either 1899 or 1900. Simultaneously, the company developed the estate's second phase, with two buildings on 64th and 65th streets, largely similar in design to the First Avenue structures. Plans for these buildings were filed in March 1900. Unlike the First Avenue buildings, they had private baths in each apartment and playrooms in the basements. The second phase was completed in June 1901, though the first residents began moving in during early 1901. By then, the First Avenue Estate, along with another complex on the Upper West Side, were garnering a 5% return on investment despite the profit restrictions accepted by City and Suburban's stockholders.

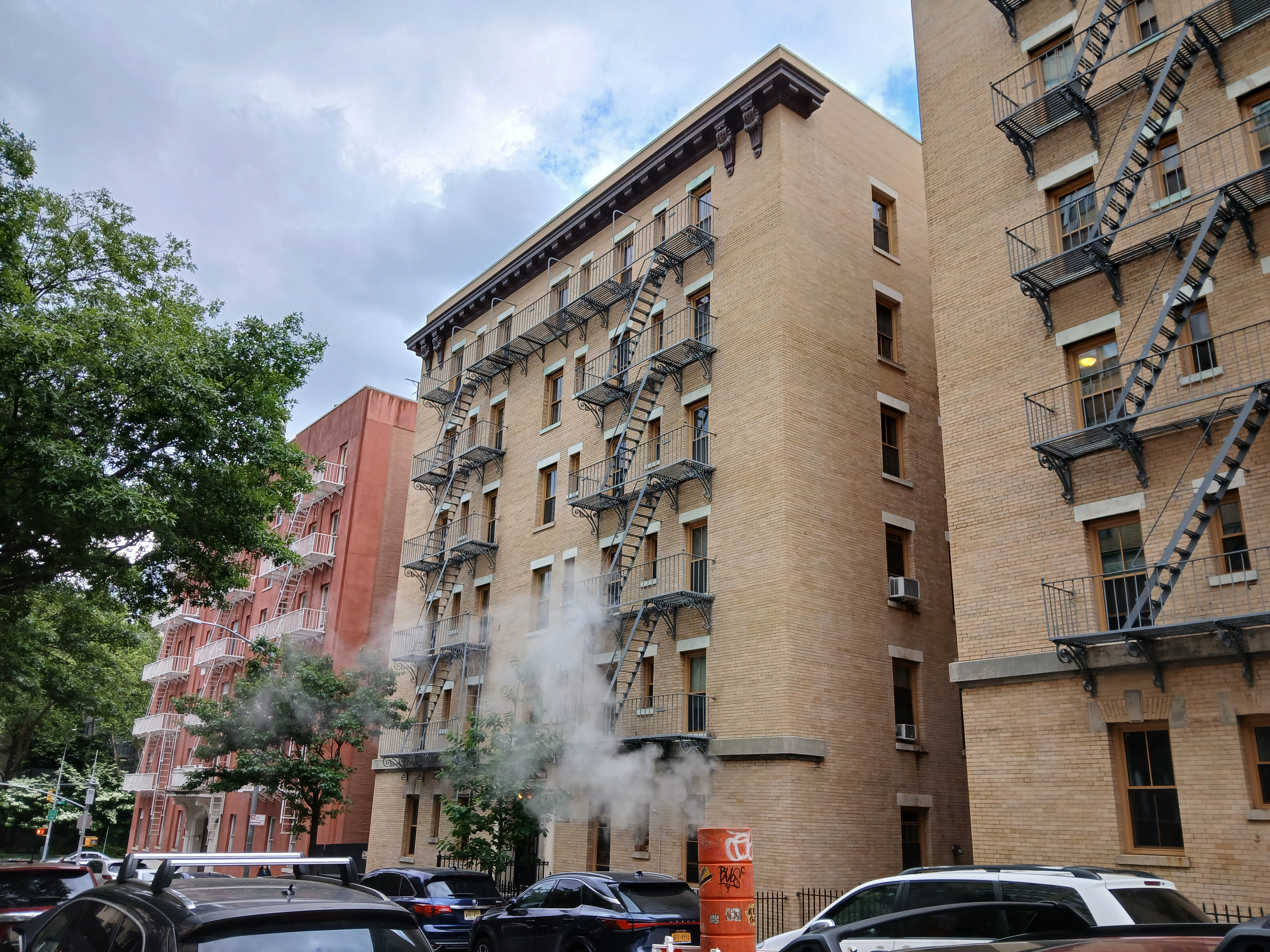
The easternmost buildings of the third phase on 65th Street

When the first four buildings were completed, the company immediately began planning a third phase, with five buildings on a 300-foot-wide (91 m) site facing 64th Street. Plans for the 64th Street row were filed in August 1901. To accommodate an increasing number of young couples, the third phase included more two-room apartments than the two previous phases. Labor and material shortfalls delayed construction by a year, and work was finished in June 1903. The original First Avenue buildings underwent minor alterations as well in 1902. By the mid-1900s, the complex had 628 tenants working in over 100 occupations, along with several women managing the buildings.

During late 1904 and early 1905, Ware devised plans for the fourth phase, comprising a group of four buildings on a 300-foot-wide site facing 65th Street, with two- to four-room apartments. With these apartments, Ware returned to constructing larger apartments, as he had done in the first two phases. The fourth phase, occupying the last remaining land on the Colored Home and Hospital site, was completed in 1906. The land for the fifth and final phase of construction, facing York Avenue (then known as Avenue A), was acquired in 1912. The two buildings facing York Avenue, at 429 East 64th and 430 East 65th, were completed in 1915 and were fully rented by the next year.

=== Late 1910s to 1980s ===
At the time of its completion, the First Avenue Estate included 1,051 apartments. The complex also housed the Italian Community Club at 404 East 64th Street. City and Suburban officials said that "the character of the people living in the vicinity" had improved as a direct result of the First Avenue Estate's construction, crediting the buildings' design and management. City and Suburban Homes continued to develop buildings until the 1940s, when World War II resulted in material shortages, although it held on to the First Avenue Estate; the company continued to be profitable into the next decade. Many but not all of the buildings in the estate were fully occupied. The building at 430 East 65th Street underwent renovations in 1949.

The buildings at 1194–1200 First Avenue were renovated in 1950, as were the buildings at 411 and 415–417 East 64th Street. That year, City and Suburban received a $5 million mortgage loan on the First Avenue and York Avenue estates. Also in the early 1950s, the City and Suburban Homes Company converted some of the apartments in the First Avenue Estate to private units for elderly residents. These units (also incorporated into some of the York Avenue Estate buildings) were finished in 1953. They included various design features for increased accessibility, such as lower furniture, larger closets, electric stoves, non-slip surfaces, and stoves. In 1961, the Diversified Management Corporation, operated by the Scheuer family, bought City and Suburban Homes' stock. The Scheuers thus took over the First Avenue Estate, owning it for one and a half decades. The estate was rebranded the Park Sutton, and apartment rental fees were increased.

In 1977, Stahl York Avenue Co. bought the buildings from the Scheuers. The Scheuers later also sold the York Avenue Estate to Peter Kalikow, who attempted to redevelop that complex in the 1980s. In contrast, the First Avenue Estate's owners did not express interest in redeveloping their estate. Nonetheless, the attempts to redevelop the York Avenue Estate prompted the New York City Landmarks Preservation Commission (LPC) to consider designating both estates as landmarks; a landmark hearing for the First Avenue Estate was scheduled in 1989.

=== 1990s to present ===
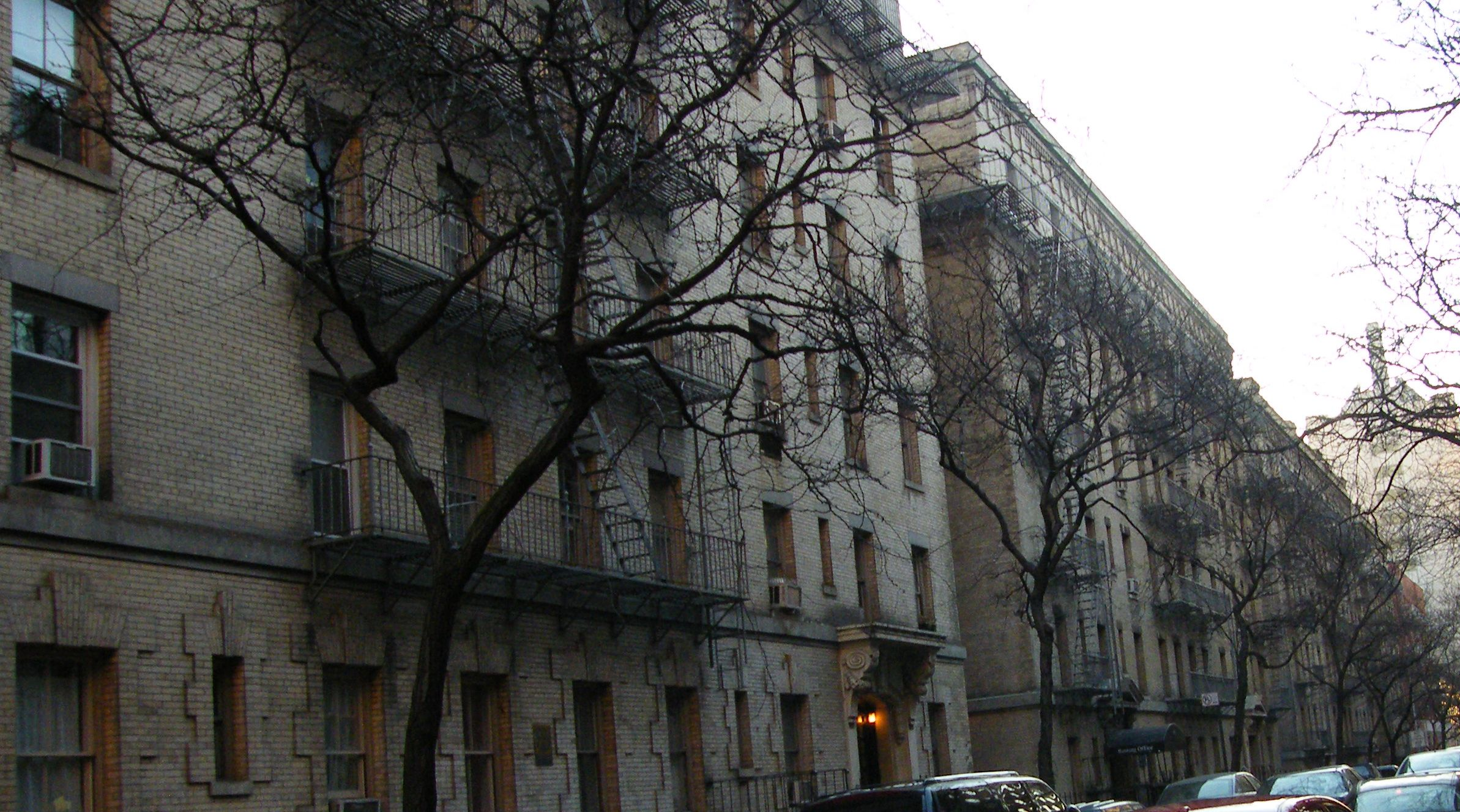
Seen in 2009

The complex was originally designated by the LPC on April 24, 1990, despite opposition from Stahl York Avenue. The LPC made the designation concurrently with that of the York Avenue Estate, whose owner Peter Kalikow also opposed the designation and had wanted to redevelop part of the Avenue A site. Both the First Avenue and York Avenue estates had been designated because of their significance in helping "to address the housing needs of the working poor". The two buildings on York Avenue were originally included in the designation, but in August 1990, the New York City Board of Estimate revoked landmark designation from two buildings each in the First Avenue and York Avenue estates. As such, the First Avenue Estate designation covered only the two buildings on First Avenue and the midblock structures on 64th and 65th streets. The de-designation of the York Avenue Estate buildings was reversed in 1992, but the two de-designated buildings in the First Avenue Estate (which faced York Avenue) remained unprotected.

A fire in one of the 65th Street buildings killed two people in 2000, and another fire killed a man in 2003. By the 2000s, Stahl wanted to demolish the York Avenue buildings, calling them unprofitable. The company estimated that the building sites could be redeveloped for a profit of $200 million, and it offered to move existing residents to the other 13 buildings. In November 2006, the LPC re-added the buildings on York Avenue to the landmark designation, citing their social importance. Stahl, which objected to the expansion of the designation, had removed the facade cladding in an attempt to prevent the LPC from landmarking the buildings; the company said that it did not believe the buildings were architecturally meritorious. Despite Stahl's objections, the New York City Council ratified the modified designation in early 2007, citing the buildings' significance in urban planning. The landmark expansion triggered a 13-year-long legal dispute.

A county court ruled in 2008 that the LPC's designation had been valid and had relied on cultural and historical, rather than architectural, factors. The New York Appellate Court upheld the designations of the York Avenue buildings in 2010. Stahl continued seeking to demolish the York Avenue buildings, saying they lost $1 million a year and proved an unreasonable financial hardship, but preservationists said that the buildings could be profitable. In 2016, the state's trial court, the New York Supreme Court, upheld the landmark designation. The New York Supreme Court, Appellate Division, upheld the decision in 2018, finding that the First Avenue Estate buildings were a singular development and that Stahl had not sufficiently proved that the York Avenue designations amounted to a governmental "taking" of private property. The United States Supreme Court declined to hear the case in 2019, thus ending the legal debate. In the meantime, the York Avenue buildings' conditions continued to decline. Stahl representatives continued to argue that the buildings lacked architectural merit.

== See also ==
- List of New York City Designated Landmarks in Manhattan from 59th to 110th Streets
- National Register of Historic Places listings in Manhattan from 59th to 110th Streets
- Celtic Park (Queens), another City and Suburban Homes development

== Sources ==
- Amendment to City & Suburban Homes Company, First Avenue Estate: 429 East 64th Street and 430 East 65th Street (PDF) (Report). New York City Landmarks Preservation Commission. November 21, 2006 [April 24, 1990].
- National Register of Historic Places Inventory/Nomination: City and Suburban Homes Company's First Avenue Estate Historic District (PDF) (Report). National Park Service. 1986.
