= York Avenue =

Avenue in Manhattan, New York

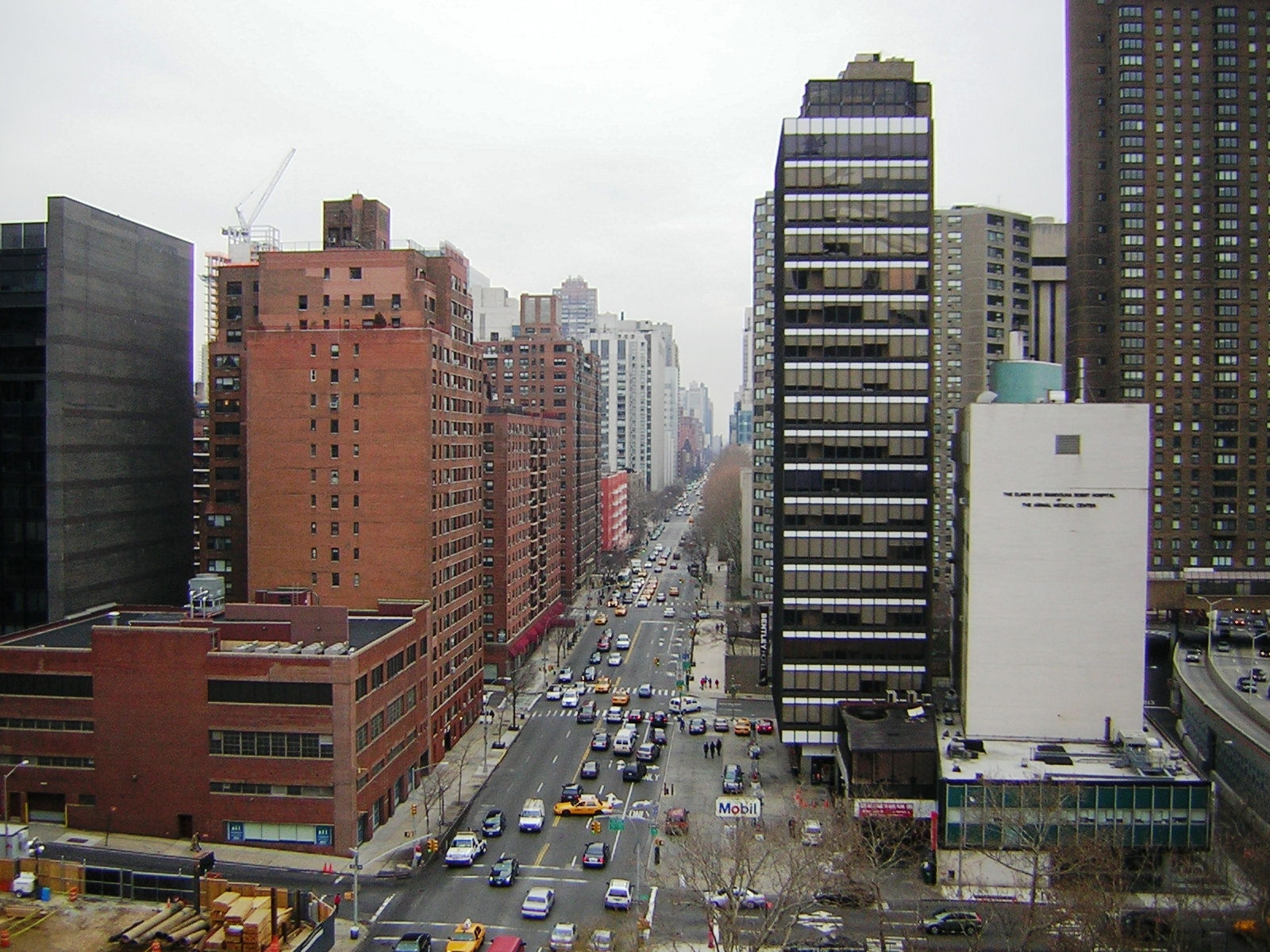
- Seen from the top of the Queensboro Bridge
- Interactive map of York Avenue
- Owner: City of New York
- Maintained by: NYCDOT
- Length: 2 mi (3.2 km)
- Location: Manhattan, New York City
- Coordinates: 40.758094°N 73.960180°W
- South end: 53rd Street in Midtown East
- Major junctions: FDR Drive in Lenox Hill
- North end: FDR Drive / 92nd Street in Yorkville
- East: FDR Drive (53rd–79th Streets); East End Avenue (79th–90th Streets); FDR Drive (90th–92nd Streets)
- West: First Avenue

Construction
- Commissioned: March 1811

York Avenue is a north–south thoroughfare in the Yorkville and Lenox Hill neighborhoods of the East Side of Manhattan, in New York City. York Avenue runs from 59th to 92nd Streets through eastern Lenox Hill and Yorkville on the Upper East Side. South of 59th Street, the avenue turns into Sutton Place, which runs to 57th Street, and Sutton Place South, which runs from 57th to 53rd Street. Addresses on York Avenue are continuous with that of Avenue A in the Alphabet City neighborhood, starting in the 1100 series and rising to the 1700 series.

== History ==
=== 19th century ===
York Avenue and Sutton Place were both proposed as an addition to the Commissioners' Plan of 1811 for Manhattan, which designated 12 broad north–south avenues running the length of the island. The geography of Manhattan left a large area on the Upper East Side east of First Avenue without a major north–south thoroughfare, so Avenue A was added to compensate. Several disconnected stretches of Avenue A built where space allowed, east of First Avenue.

The section of Avenue A (now York Avenue) from 59th to 60th streets was named "Sutton Place" by 1883. It was named for Effingham B. Sutton, who constructed a group of brownstones between 57th and 58th Streets.

=== 20th century ===
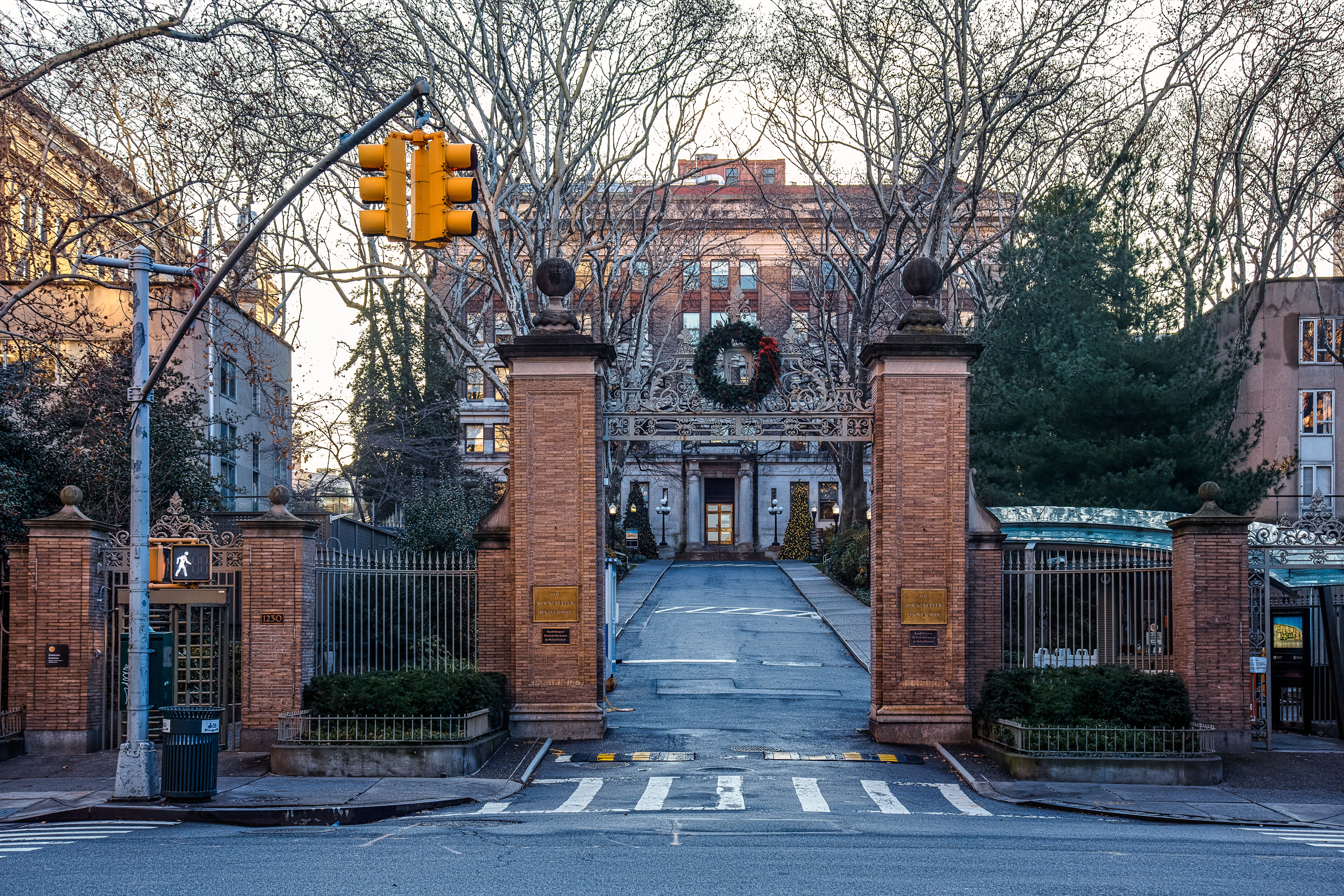
Gates of The Rockefeller University on York Avenue

In 1906, The Rockefeller Institute (the predecessor to The Rockefeller University) moved its laboratories to the site of the former Schermerhorn farm at York Avenue (then called Avenue A) and 66th Street. John D. Rockefeller purchased the land from the Schermerhorn estate between Avenue A and the East River extending from 64th Street to 67th Street in 1903.

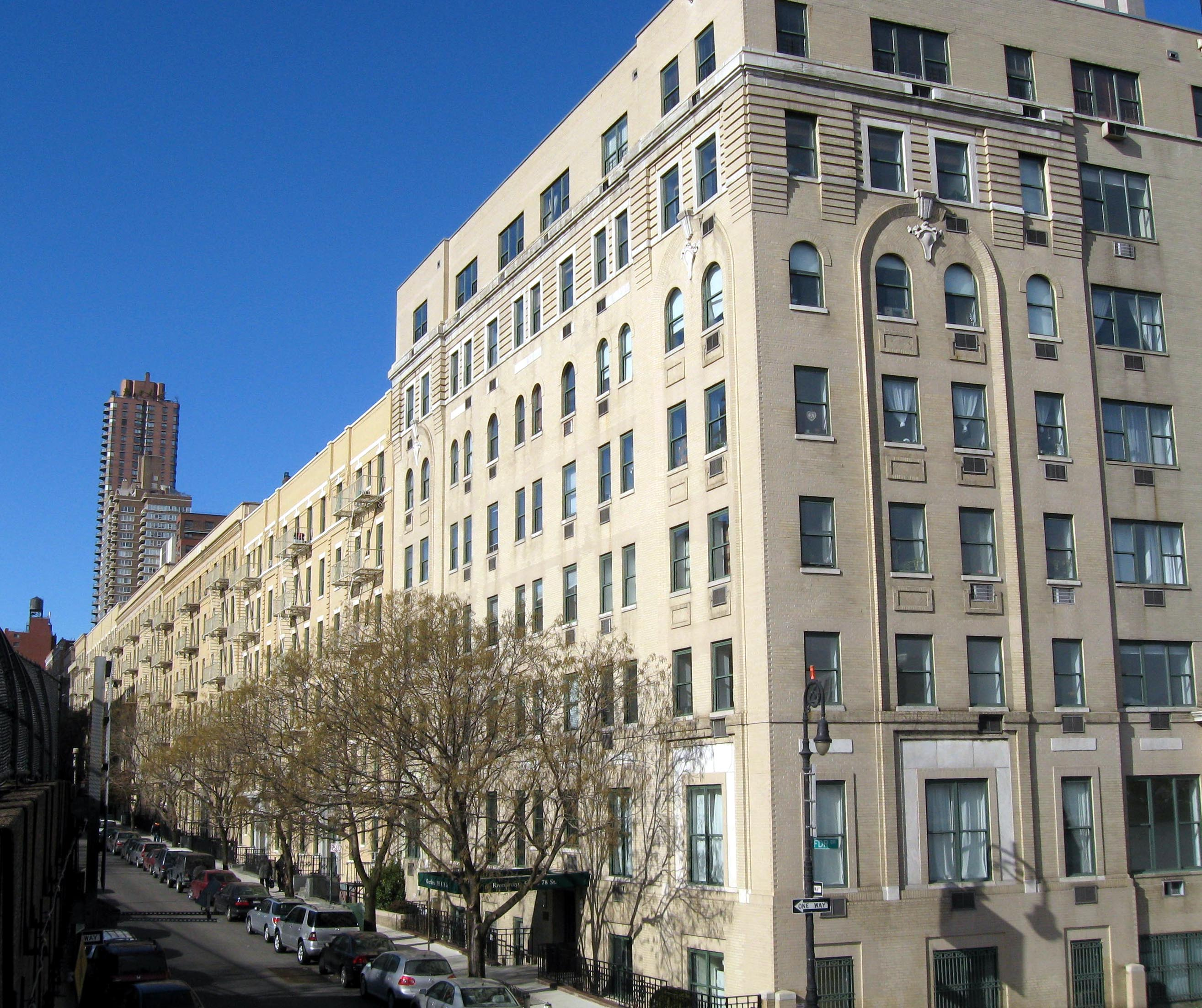
Cherokee Apartments in the "Avenue A Estate" of New York & Suburban Homes Company, named before the avenue was renamed

The Rockefeller Institute Hospital opened in 1910. In 1912, New York Hospital became affiliated with the Cornell University Medical College and in 1932 moved to its current location, a joint facility, the New York Hospital-Cornell Medical Center, on York Avenue between East 67th and 68th streets. In 1998, NY Hospital merged with Presbyterian Hospital to become NewYork–Presbyterian Hospital (NYP) and the site functions as one of the main campuses of NYP. On the west side of Avenue A, across the street from the Rockefeller Institute, in 1925, the Rockefeller Garden Apartments opened. These were meant to be affordable housing, "good homes for low rents" for people with children.

In 1928, a one-block section of Sutton Place north of 59th Street, and all of Avenue A north of that point, was renamed York Avenue to honor U.S. Army Sergeant Alvin York, who received the Medal of Honor during World War I's Meuse-Argonne Offensive. York, commanding only a few men took over 125 German soldiers as prisoners. York's feat made him a national hero and international celebrity among allied nations.

In 1932, New York Hospital and Cornell University Medical College (which affiliated in 1913) moved to its current location, a joint facility, the New York Hospital-Cornell Medical Center, on York Avenue at 68th Street. In 1998, NY Hospital merged with Presbyterian Hospital to become NewYork–Presbyterian Hospital (NYP) and the site functions as one of the main campuses of NYP.

In 1939, the Memorial Hospital opened on York Avenue, between 67th and 68th Streets, on land donated by John D. Rockefeller Jr.

== Points of interest ==
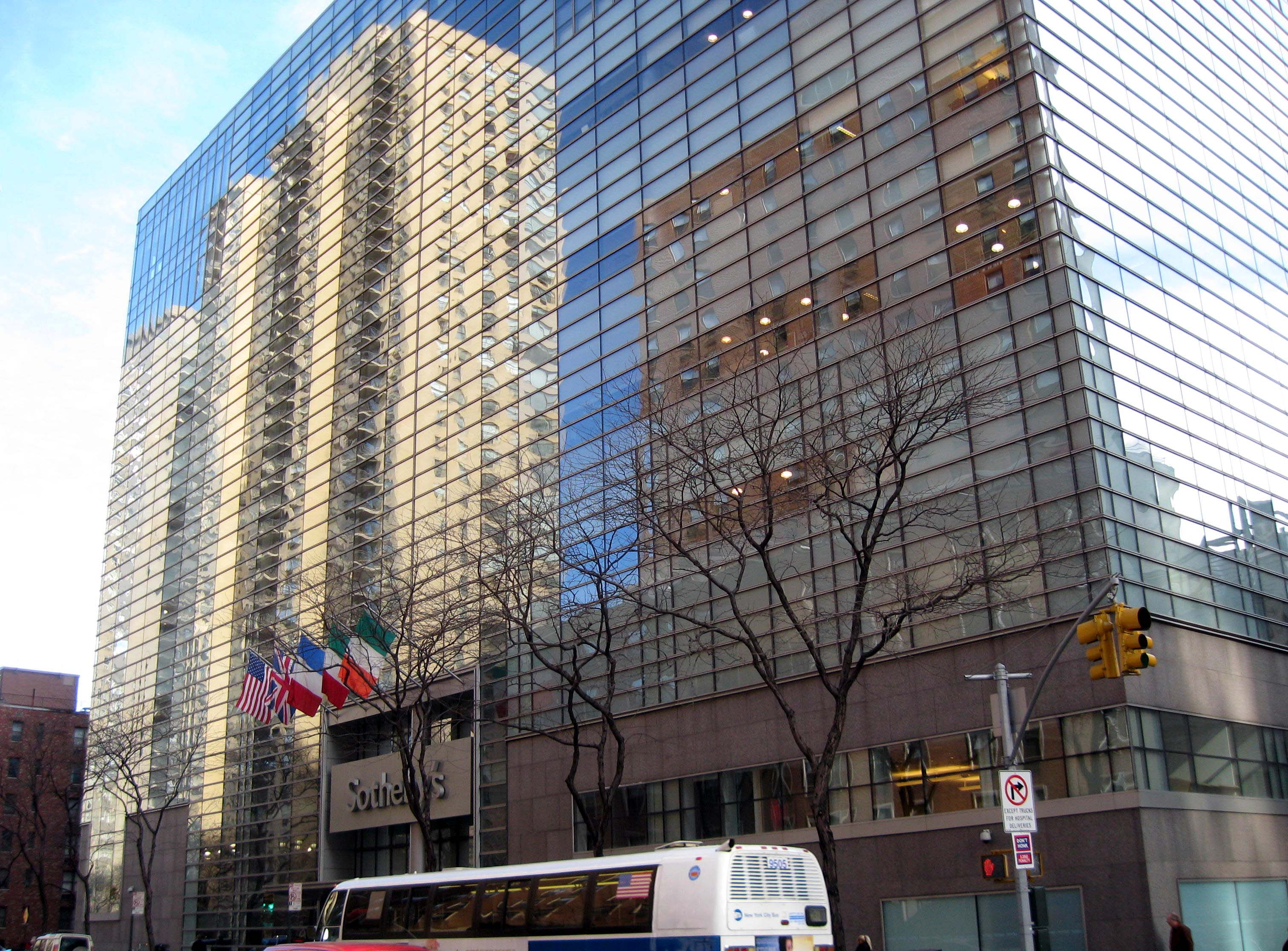
Auction house Sotheby's headquarters on York Avenue between 71st and 72nd Streets

The auction house Sotheby's was headquartered on York Avenue until it moved to the Whitney Museum's Breuer Building in 2025. Founder's Hall of Rockefeller University, a National Historic Landmark, is located at York Avenue and 66th Street. Parts of the York Avenue Estate and First Avenue Estate, both city landmarks, also face York Avenue.

== See also ==
- 2006 New York City Cirrus SR20 crash, a plane crash just off of York Avenue on October 11, 2006
- Beekman Place
- Pleasant Avenue
