= Cherokee Apartments =

Apartment buildings in Manhattan, New York

Coordinates: 40°46′12″N 73°57′0″W

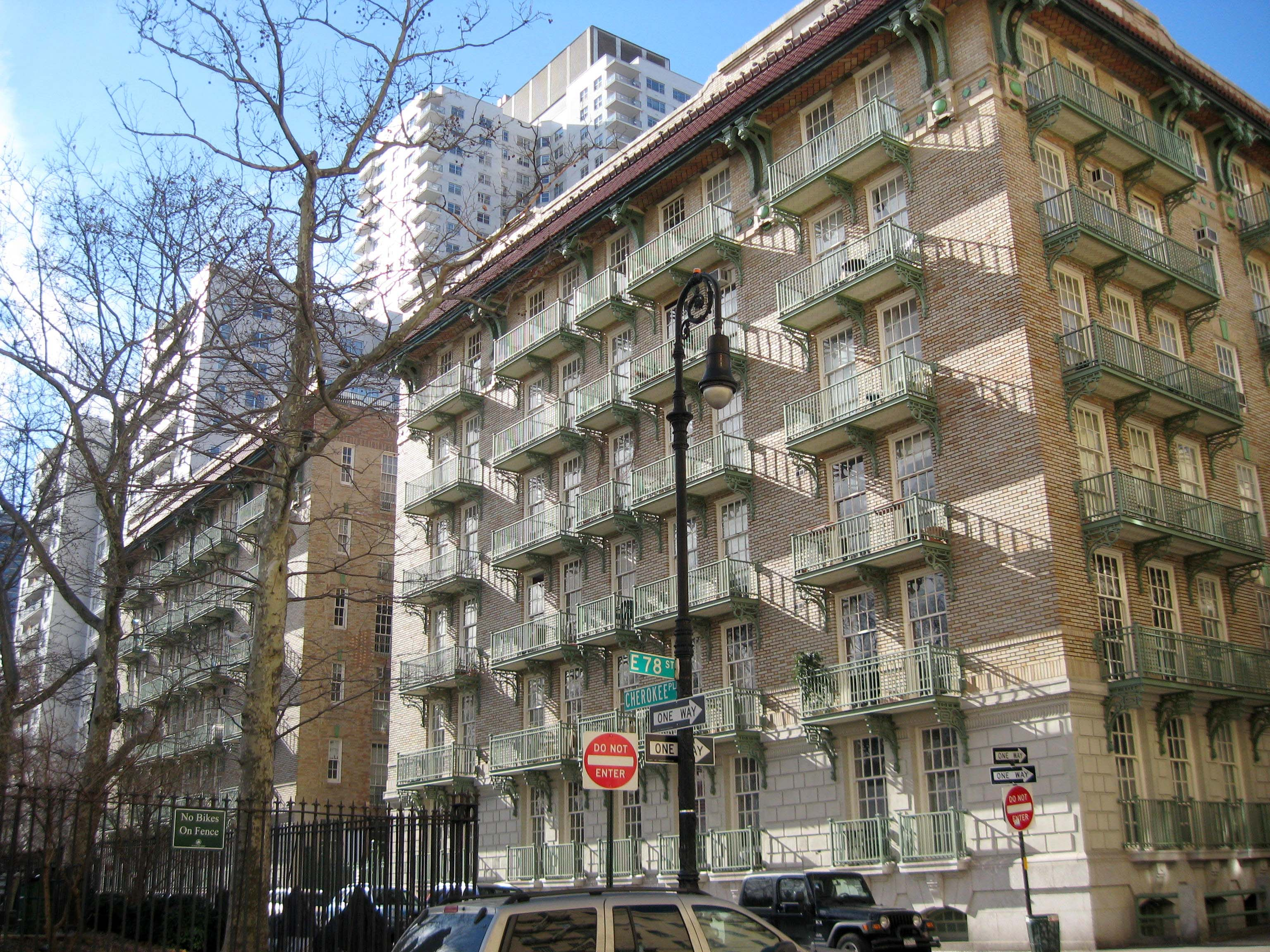
The Cherokee Apartments as seen from 78th Street and Cherokee Place

The Cherokee Apartments (formerly the East River Homes and the Shively Sanitary Tenements) is a four-building apartment complex on 507–523 East 77th Street and 508–522 East 78th Street on the Upper East Side of Manhattan in New York City. Constructed in 1912 as a residence for people with tuberculosis and their families, the buildings were designed by Henry Atterbury Smith. They incorporated architectural features such as floor-to-ceiling windows, balconies, and interior courtyards that were designed to aid ailing residents. The buildings have terra cotta and brick facades with green tile roofs. Each building has a central courtyard connected to the street by vaulted passages lined with Guastavino tile.

The complex was converted into regular rental apartments in 1924, and later became a co-op. It became a New York City designated landmark in 1985. The buildings are also contributing properties to a National Register of Historic Places district, the City and Suburban Homes Company's York Avenue Estate and Shively Sanitary Tenements Historic District.

== Description ==
The complex comprises four buildings in the block bounded by York Avenue on the west, East 78th Street on the north, Cherokee Place on the east, and East 77th Street on the south. Each building is six stories high. The buildings were all designed by Henry Atterbury Smith, who had promoted an "open stair" plan for more healthful apartment buildings. Smith wished to give residents as much exposure to the outdoors as possible. As such, the architectural features include triple-hung floor-to-ceiling windows, French balconies, winding open stairwells, and interior courtyards – designed to provide an airy and healthful environment for sick residents.

=== Form and facade ===
The complex comprises four buildings: 508–514 East 78th Street to the northwest, 516–522 East 78th Street to the northeast, 517–523 East 77th Street to the southeast, and 507–515 East 77th Street to the southwest. A driveway runs west–east between the northern and southern buildings. There are also recesses separating the eastern and western buildings on either street, which contain driveways that slope down to the basement. The two eastern buildings face Cherokee Place, while the two western buildings face a neighboring school's playground, separated from it by a one-story-high retaining wall. The buildings contain nearly identical facades and are each six stories tall. Each building's entrance connects to a vaulted passage with Guastavino tile ceilings and glazed brick walls, which in turn leads to a courtyard in the middle of each building.

The first stories of each building are faced with terra cotta, which is laid in a manner resembling rustication. There is an areaway in front of each building along 77th and 78th Streets, with windows in the basement. The center of each building's north or south facade contains a large rectangular entrance, which leads to that building's vaulted passageway; the entrances are flanked by bronze lamps. The entryways on 77th Street are surrounded by pineapple motifs, while those on 78th Street are plain in design. A cornice above each entrance is supported by a pair of elaborate console brackets at either corner and a keystone at the center. The rest of the ground-floor facade contains either triple-paned windows with balconies or smaller double-paned windows without balconies. A frieze, with egg-and-dart moldings and double-ball motifs, separates the first story from the others. The two easternmost buildings have facades along Cherokee Place, but there are no doors or areaways at ground level.

The upper stories use brick and are divided vertically into numerous bays, most of which have balconies. (Note: In the easternmost buildings, the bays are arranged in a 3-1-5-1-3 pattern on 77th or 78th Street (where the single bays have no balconies), and in a 2-5-2 pattern on Cherokee Place (where all bays have balconies). In the westernmost buildings, the bays are arranged in a 4-1-5-1-3 pattern on 77th or 78th Street, as counted from west to east, where the single bays have no balconies.) Each balcony contains a metal railing, Guastavino tiles on its underside, and curved metal brackets below. Some of the bays do not have balconies and instead contain smaller windows with keystones. Above the fifth floor, within the bays that do not contain balconies, a pair of horizontal brick bands and a set of green rhombus-shaped terracotta motifs runs across the facade. The sixth story of each building is topped by a green-tiled roof, supported by pairs of one-story-high metal brackets. The buildings on 77th Street, and those on 78th Street, are connected to each other by a plain brick wall with sash windows and small balconies and are topped by a tall, narrow parapet.

=== Features ===
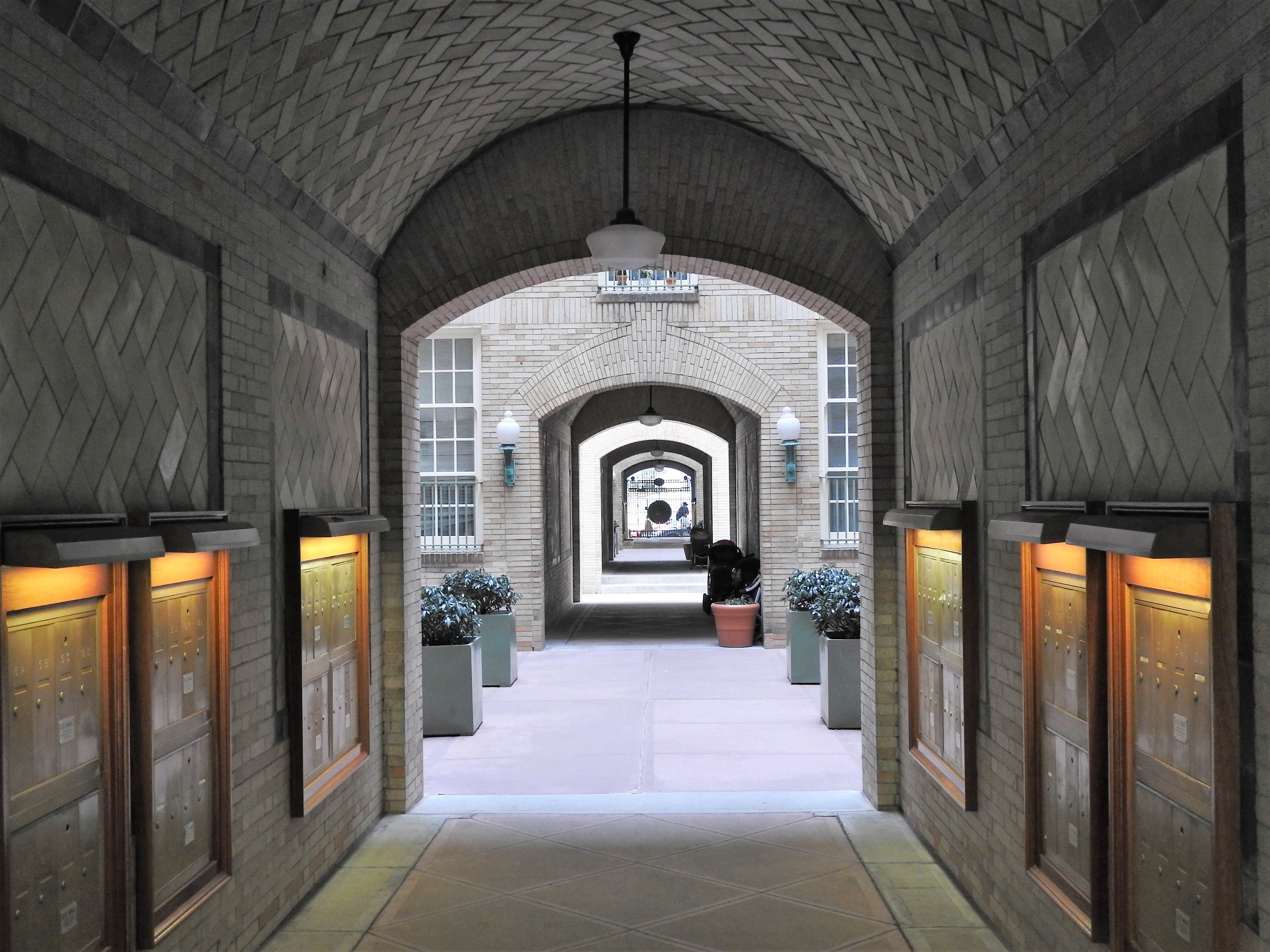
Passageway to one of the Cherokee Apartments' courtyards

The internal courtyard of each building measured 30 or 31 feet (9.1 or 9.4 m) square. All tenants had to enter their buildings from these structures' courtyards. The courtyards have tan-brick facades with small balconies and decorative rectangular wall panels, similar to those on the exterior facades. Each building had four exterior staircases, one at each corner of its central courtyard, which led to the roof. Each stair had a wire glass canopy to protect residents from the elements; white-tiled walls, which were seen as both reflective and sanitary; safety treads on each step; and a pair of handrails for both adults and children. There were also glass roofs above the top of each staircase, which were removed in the 1940s. Architectural historian Christopher Gray said the roofs "looked as though a Bauhaus engineer had squared up one of Hector Guimard’s Art Nouveau subway entrances in Paris." Benches were placed at each landing, and four apartments opened off each stairway at each level. This reduced the need for interior corridors and, thus, the spread of germs. There were no elevators, presumably as a cost-cutting measure.

The complex was originally planned with up to 375 units of between two and five rooms each. As built, there were 383 or 384 apartments across the complex, the majority of which were two rooms. Each apartment included its own bathroom and was supplied with electricity, heat, and hot water. Balconies were also installed outside each of the apartments, and tenants were allowed to sleep on the balconies. A contemporary New York Times article wrote, "In hot weather, a bed or two may be placed outside there."

The roofs were open for recreational access. The original plans for the apartment buildings' roofs called for a glass windbreak on the north side of each roof; a tiled floor surface bathrooms for women, men, and children; and shrubs and steamer chairs. The roof was intended to house an open-air school for children with tuberculosis.

== History ==
=== Development and tuberculosis home ===
In February 1909, Anne Harriman Vanderbilt announced that she would donate $1 million (equivalent to $36 million in 2025) to build a set of four model tenements for people living with tuberculosis and their families. The idea for the model tenements was conceived by Henry Shively, head of the tuberculosis clinic at the New York Presbyterian Hospital, and visiting physician to the St Joseph's Hospital for Consumptives, in a period when tuberculosis was a major public-health issue in New York City. Shively argued that architecture could play a role in the treatment of disease by providing a sanitary environment. Mrs. Vanderbilt also contributed $81,000 (equivalent to $3 million in 2025) to buy the site on 77th and 78th Streets, which was ten blocks from the Presbyterian Hospital's tuberculosis treatment ward. Anne's husband William Kissam Vanderbilt hired Henry Atterbury Smith to design the tenements, and Smith submitted plans to the New York City Department of Buildings in November 1909.

The complex was dedicated on January 5, 1912, with Ms. Vanderbilt on hand for inspection. The complex, originally known as the Shively Sanitary Tenements or the East River Homes, served as a residence for people with tuberculosis and their families. The buildings formally opened to tenants on January 15. Rent for single rooms ranged from $1.25 to $2 a week (equivalent to $42 to $67 in 2025), while rent for multi-room units started at $2.50 per week (equivalent to $83 in 2025). Almost a third of the apartments were rented to people with tuberculosis upon opening. A section of the complex, consisting of 24 south-facing apartments, was designated as a "Home Hospital" for virulent cases to be treated, as an alternative to confinement at a sanatorium. The New York Association for Improving the Condition of the Poor found, after two years, that the vast majority of these apartments' residents had either recovered from tuberculosis or had improved to some degree.

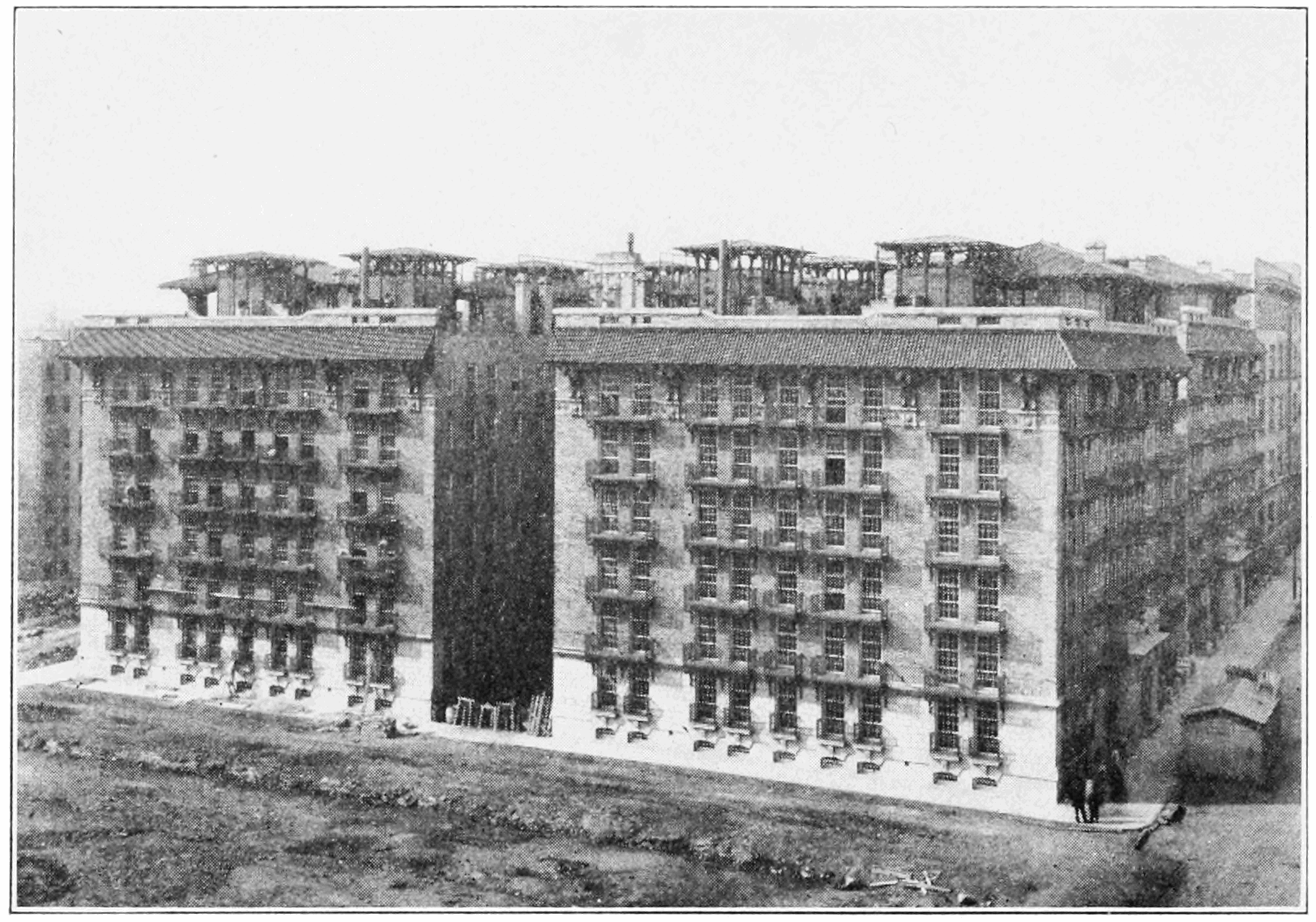
A 1912 image of the apartments

The apartments were overseen by a trust, with part of the rental income dedicated to the treatment of tuberculosis victims. William K. Vanderbilt originally owned the buildings before transferring the buildings to the trustees in October 1913. A 1915 census indicated that most apartments were occupied by two or three residents. The tenants included brakemen, chauffeurs, cigar packers, electricians, pharmacists, and telephone operators.

=== Later years ===
The trust that operated the buildings was dissolved in 1923. The Presbyterian Hospital sold the buildings to the City and Suburban Homes Company in October 1924, twelve years after the tenements were dedicated. The structures became regular apartments.

For its architectural and historical significance, it was designated a New York City landmark in 1985. Paul Goldberger of the Times wrote that the Cherokee Apartments and City and Suburban Homes' neighboring York Avenue Estate stood "as perhaps our greatest legacy from a critical moment in both the architectural and social history of the city." The buildings are also contributing properties to the City and Suburban Homes Company's York Avenue Estate and Shively Sanitary Tenements Historic District, a National Register of Historic Places district established in 1994.

The Cherokee Apartments had become co-ops by the 2000s, and local firm Merritt Engineering Consultants had refurbished the facade by the early 21st century. The complex's windows were replaced in the early 2010s. Christopher Gray wrote in The New York Times in 2014 that "it is possible to pay around a half-million dollars for a fifth-floor walk-up" in the former Shively Sanitary Tenements.

== Reception ==
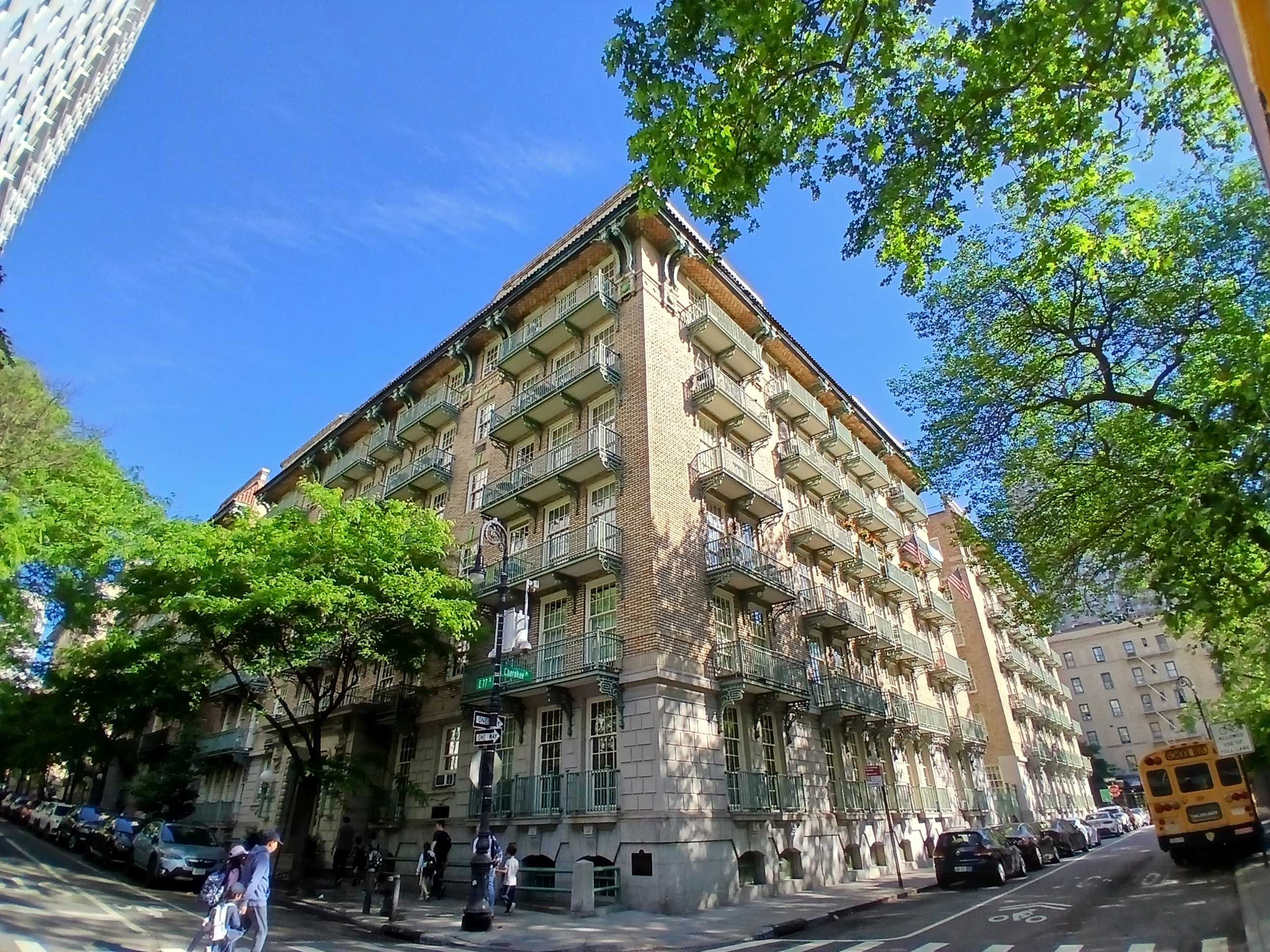
The buildings seen from 78th Street and Cherokee Place

When the apartments were completed, a contemporary article from The New York Times compared them favorably to other tenements in the city. The Construction News magazine described the Shively tenements as "airy, large, comfortable, [and] architecturally beautiful." The Lancet-Clinic wrote in 1914: "The success of this experiment ... should stimulate the community to forbid the maintenance of unsanitary buildings, as well as to construct those of the same high standard as the East River Homes and there to treat persons having tuberculosis without the necessity of breaking up homes or depriving those who are able to work of the opportunity to do so..."

Gray wrote for The New York Times in 1988 that the neighboring Avenue A Estate was "a good bit less ornate than the Cherokee Apartments." Another writer for The New York Times said in 2017 that the apartments were "at once functional and beautiful, and were medically cutting-edge at the time they were built, with a focus on creating healthful and sanitary living conditions."

== See also ==
- List of New York City Designated Landmarks in Manhattan from 59th to 110th Streets
- National Register of Historic Places listings in Manhattan from 59th to 110th Streets
