= St Joseph's Hospital for Consumptives =

Coordinates: 40.810299°N 73.916390°W

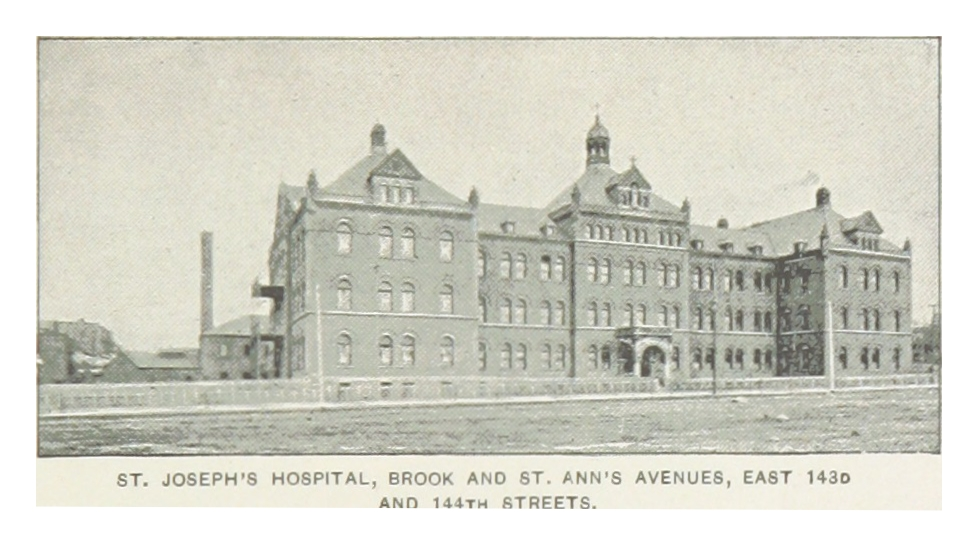

History
- Founded: 1882

St Joseph's Hospital for Consumptives, established in 1882 by Franciscan Sisters of the Third Order, and occupied the entire block between East 143rd and 144th Streets and Brook and St. Ann's Avenues. It was one of eight hospitals for people with tuberculosis in New York at the turn of the twentieth century.
