= Hudnut =

Hudnut is a surname. Notable people with the surname include:

- David Hudnut, American artist
- Joseph Hudnut (1886–1968), American architect scholar
- Peter Hudnut (born 1980), American water polo player
- Richard Hudnut (1855–1928), American businessman
- William H. Hudnut III (1932–2016), American politician
