= Texas Beach Skate Park =

Skatepark in Richmond, Virginia, U.S.

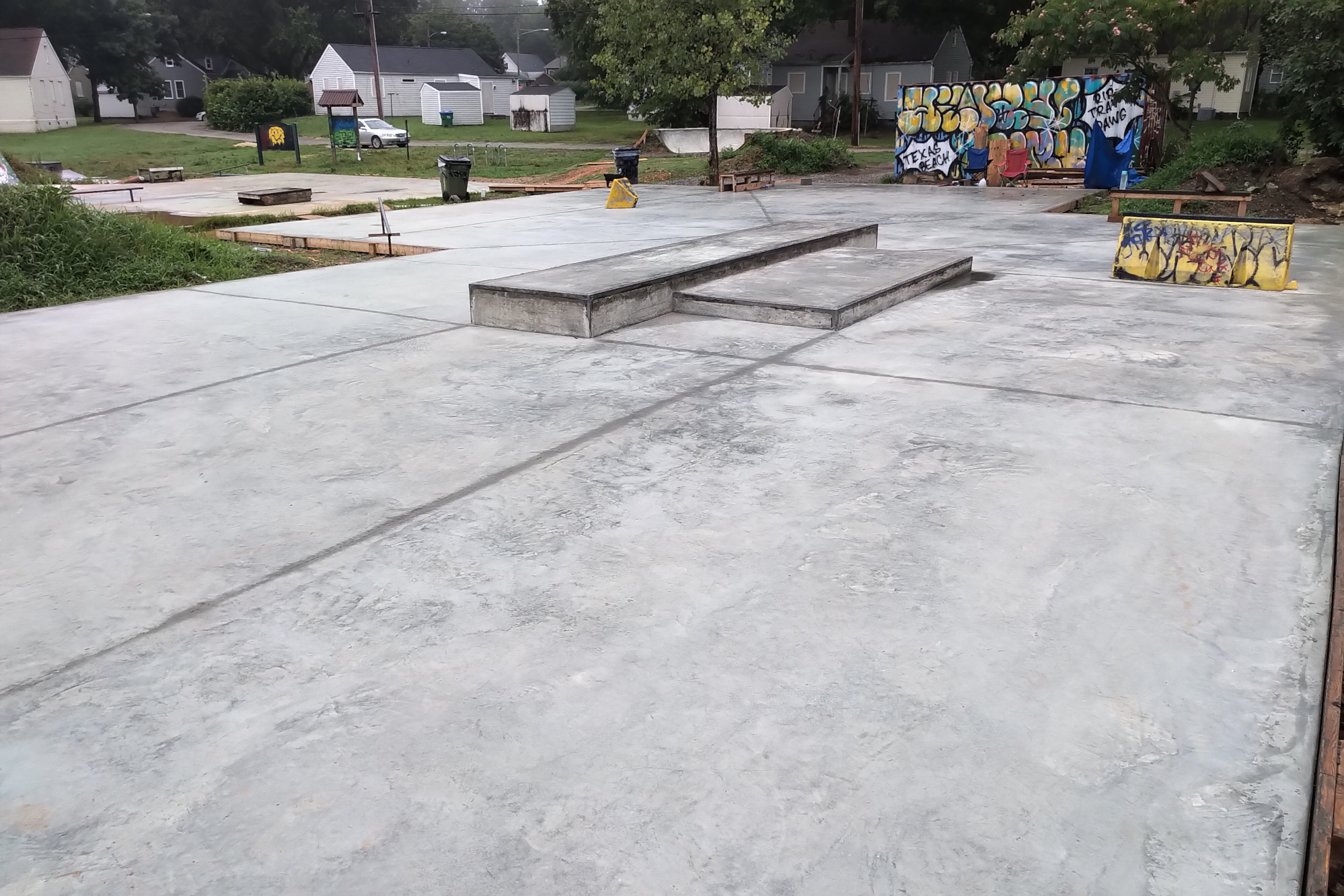
- Texas Beach Skate Park
- Interactive map of Texas Beach Skate Park
- Type: Skatepark
- Location: Richmond, Virginia 23220, United States
- Coordinates: 37.532143°N 77.468639°W
- Created: 2018
- Operator: Richmond Area Skateboard Alliance
- Open: 24 hours year-round
- Status: Active, work in progress

Texas Beach Skate Park, also known as Treasure Island Community Skate Park, is a DIY skatepark located within the planned Riverview Community Park in the Texas Beach riverside area on the north bank of the James River in Richmond, Virginia, United States.

Under ongoing construction and expansion by a group of local-area skateboarders and volunteers, with additional support and organizational assistance from the Richmond Area Skateboard Alliance (RASA), the skatepark comprises two separate concrete slabs, the older lower level consisting of the original Texas Beach DIY skate spot, and the newer upper level poured in 2019. With ongoing development sanctioned by the City of Richmond, but without direct financial support from the Richmond Department of Parks, Recreation, and Community Facilities, construction and expansion of the skatepark continue to be undertaken purely by the efforts of local skateboarders and volunteers with donated concrete, coping, and other materials.

Texas Beach Skate Park is the second public skatepark in the City of Richmond, and the first and only public skatepark in the City north of the river. In contrast to Carter Jones Skate Park, the city's first public skatepark on southside and the only one officially opened and formally dedicated by the city, the skate park has a strong volunteer culture and DIY vibe.

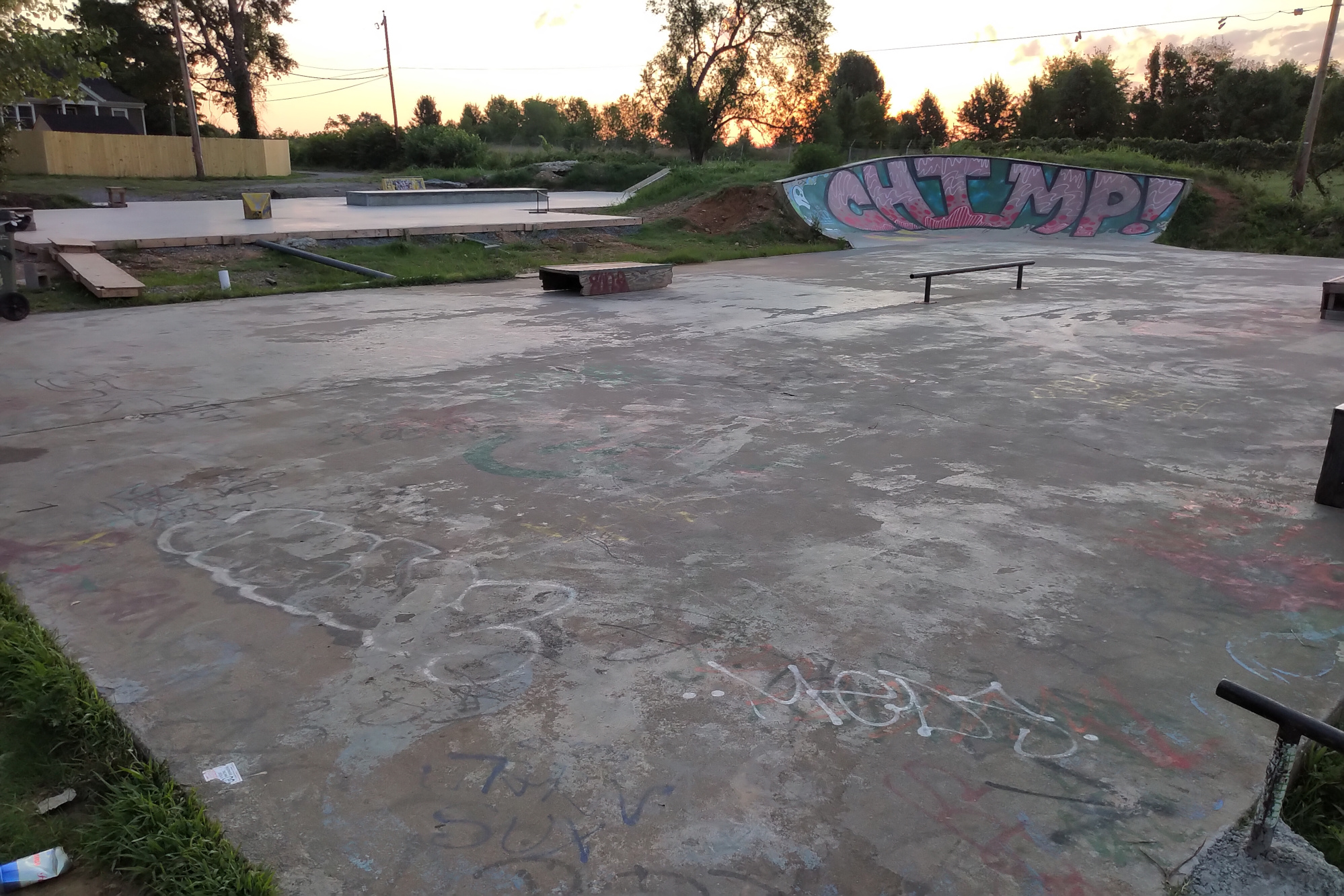
The lower slab at Texas Beach Skate Park (the original Texas Beach DIY skate spot)

== Elements ==
The original lower slab (the original Texas Beach DIY skate spot) features a quarter pipe with center pad, a six-foot-high bowl corner, and two rails; this lower slab has a rougher concrete surface that more closely mimics typical street skating conditions. The newer upper slab, with a recently poured concrete surface at a slight inclination, features two adjoined manual pads of differing heights (with coping); this upper slab features a very smooth concrete surface that is ideal for beginning skateboarders learning how to skate. An additional bowl corner is also connected over a hump to the lower slab. The two slabs, at different elevations, are connected by a fixed rail; construction of a concrete ramp to connect the upper and lower slabs is a tentative future project. As a DIY skatepark, numerous additional movable rails, construction barriers, wooden pads, ramps, and raw construction materials are available on site for use by skateboarders.

== See also ==
- Ashland Skate Park
- Carter Jones Skate Park
- Skateparks in Virginia
