= Carter Jones Skate Park =

Skatepark in Richmond, Virginia, US

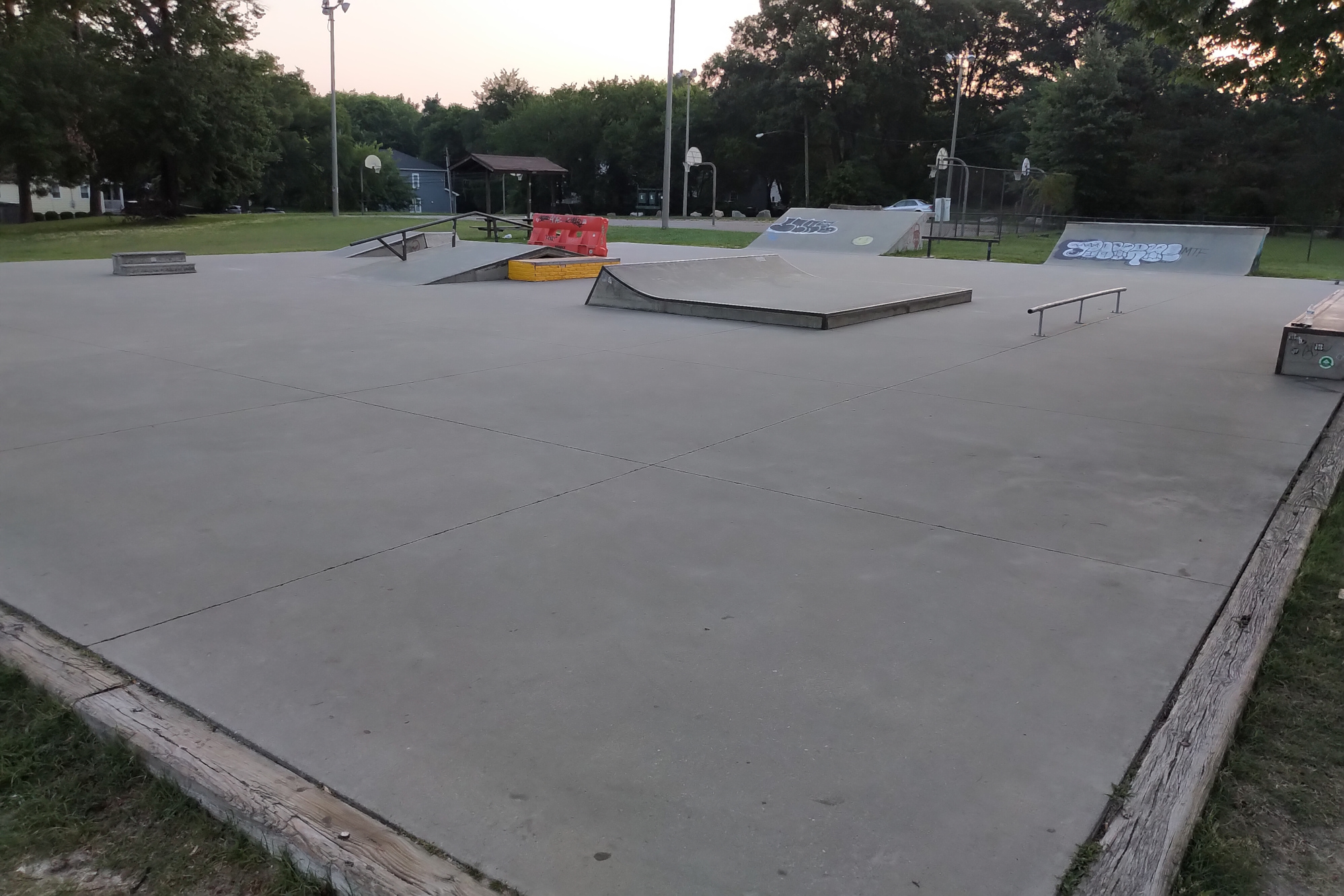
- Carter Jones Skate Park
- Interactive map of Carter Jones Skate Park
- Type: Skatepark
- Location: 2813 Bainbridge Street, Richmond, Virginia, United States
- Coordinates: 37.516519°N 77.460169°W
- Created: 2013
- Operator: Richmond Parks, Recreation, and Community Facilities
- Open: 24 hours year-round
- Status: Active

Carter Jones Skate Park, also known as Fonticello Skate Park, is a skatepark located within Carter Jones Park in Richmond, Virginia, United States. Opened on July 28, 2013, officially as Fonticello Skate Park, Carter Jones Skate Park is the city's first public skatepark and is maintained by the Richmond Department of Parks, Recreation, and Community Facilities.

== Elements ==
Carter Jones Skate Park features three quarter pipes, a back-to-back ramp with rail, a single-ended ramp, an elevated flat with curvature, two banks, and a stair box, all with steel coping, and a fixed rail. In addition movable rails and construction barriers are usually found on site.

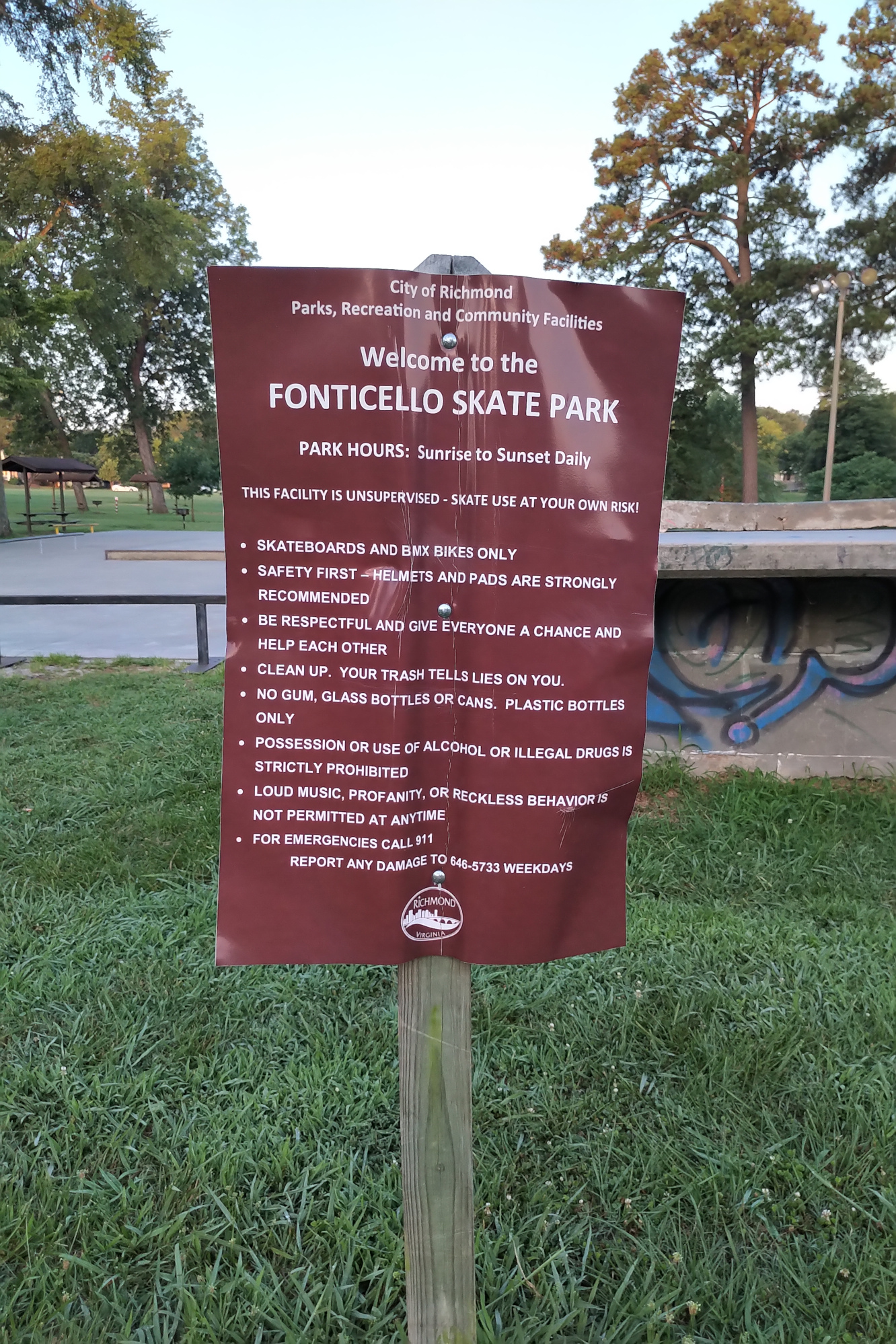
Sign at Fonticello Skate Park at Carter Jones Park

== See also ==
- Skateparks in Virginia
- Ashland Skate Park
- Texas Beach Skate Park
