= Walter Russell =

American artist (1871–1963)

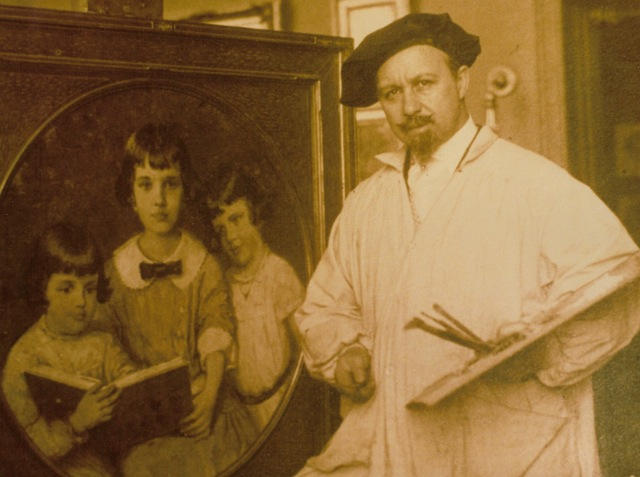
- Russell in 1904
- Born: May 19, 1871; Boston, Massachusetts, U.S.
- Died: May 19, 1963 (aged 92); Waynesboro, Virginia, U.S.
- Occupations: Artist, musician, philosopher, author, and lecturer

Walter Bowman Russell (May 19, 1871 – May 19, 1963) was an American impressionist painter, sculptor, property developer, and author. Russell wrote extensively on topics relating to science, but his ideas did not gain much attention from scientists.

== Life and career ==
Born in Boston on May 19, 1871, to Nova Scotian immigrants, Russell left school at age 9 and went to work, then put himself through the Massachusetts Normal Art School. He interrupted his fourth year to spend three months in Paris at the Académie Julian. Biographer Glenn Clark identifies four instructors who prepared him for an art career: Albert Munsell and Ernest Major in Boston, Howard Pyle in Philadelphia, and Jean-Paul Laurens in Paris.

In his youth, Russell earned money as a church organist and music teacher, and by conducting a trio in a hotel.

Before he left Boston in 1894, Russell married Helen Andrews (1894–1953). They traveled to Paris for their wedding trip and a second term for him at the Académie Julian. After their wedding trip, they settled in New York City in 1894 and had two daughters, Helen and Louise. Russell's rise in New York was immediate; a reporter wrote in 1908, "Mr. Russell came here from Boston and at once became a great artistic success."

At age 29, he attracted widespread attention with his allegorical painting The Might of Ages in 1900. The painting represented the United States at the Turin international exhibition and won several awards.

By 1903, Russell had published three children's books (The Sea Children, The Bending of the Twig, and The Age of Innocence) and qualified for the Authors Club, which he joined in 1902.

Russell made his mark as a builder, creating $30 million worth of cooperative apartments. He is credited with developing "cooperative ownership into an economically sound and workable principle." The Hotel des Artistes at the West 67th Street Artists' Colony in Manhattan, designed by architect George Mort Pollard, has been described as his masterpiece. Farther north, Russell developed a similar building, 44 West 77th Street, in 1907. Russell was also involved in the initial development of Alwyn Court, at Seventh Avenue and 58th Street in Manhattan, but dropped out before the project's completion.

In the 1930s, Russell was employed by Thomas J. Watson, chairman of IBM, as a motivational speaker for IBM employees. He was employed at IBM for twelve years.

At age 56 he turned to sculpture and fashioned portrait busts of Thomas Edison, Mark Twain, General MacArthur, John Philip Sousa, Ossip Gabrilowitsch, Charles Goodyear, George Gershwin and others. He rose to top rank as a sculptor. He won the commissions for the Mark Twain Memorial (1934) and for President Franklin D. Roosevelt's Four Freedoms Monument (1943).

Russell became a leader in the Science of Man Movement when he was elected president of the Society of Arts and Sciences in 1927. His seven-year tenure generated many articles in the New York Times. The gold medals awarded by the Society were highly valued.

As World War II approached, he moved into a top-floor studio at Carnegie Hall, where he lived alone (his estranged wife Helen lived in Connecticut). At the time, he was supervising the casting of the Four Freedoms. This was a low time that required a rejuvenation of his health and spirit. There were reports of his "egotism and self-aggrandizement" that bothered him.

== Russell's cosmogony ==
Russell claimed to have experienced a transformational and revelatory event in May 1921, which he later described in a chapter called "The Story of My Illumining" in the 1950 edition of his Home Study Course. "During that period...I could perceive all motion," and was newly "aware of all things." Russell used the terminology of Richard Maurice Bucke in Bucke's 1901 book Cosmic Consciousness to explain "cosmic illumination."

Russell published The Universal One in 1926 and The Russell Genero-Radiative Concept in 1930. He defended his ideas in the pages of the New York Times in 1930–1931. In 1943, Russell wrote, "It will be remembered that no one who has ever had [the experience of illumination] has been able to explain it. I deem it my duty to the world to tell of it;" that became the subject of his book The Divine Iliad, published in two volumes in 1949. In 1947 he published The Secret of Light.

Russell described his cosmogony in A New Concept of the Universe (1953), where he wrote that "the cardinal error of science" was "shutting the Creator out of his Creation." Russell never referred to an anthropomorphic god, but rather wrote that "God is the invisible, motionless, sexless, undivided, and unconditioned white Magnetic Light of Mind" which centers all things. "God is provable by laboratory methods," Russell wrote, "The locatable motionless Light which man calls magnetism is the Light which God IS." He wrote that Religion and Science must come together in a New Age.

In 1926, Russell copyrighted a spiral shaped Periodic Chart of the Elements.

== With Lao Russell at Swannanoa in Virginia 1948–1963 ==
In 1948, at the age of 77, Russell divorced his first wife and married Daisy Stebbing, aged 44, an immigrant from England and former model and businesswoman, amid some controversy. She changed her name to Lao (after Lao-Tzu, the Chinese illuminate) and they embarked on a cross-country automobile trip from Reno looking for a place to establish a workplace and a museum for his work. They discovered Swannanoa, the palatial estate of a railroad magnate, long abandoned, on a mountaintop on the border of Augusta and Nelson Counties in Virginia, and leased the property for 50 years. There they established the museum and the Walter Russell Foundation.

In 1957 the Commonwealth of Virginia granted a charter for the University of Science and Philosophy, a correspondence school with a home study course. (In 2014, the charter was grandfathered back to 1948.) The Russells collaborated on a number of books. The testing of atomic bombs in the atmosphere prompted them to publish Atomic Suicide? in 1957, in which they warned of grave consequences for the planet and humankind if radioactivity was exploited as a world fuel.

Russell died in 1963. Lao died in 1988.

== Books ==
- The Sea Children, 1901
- The Bending of the Twig, 1903
- The Age of Innocence, 1904
- The Universal One, 1926
- The Russell Genero-Radiative Concept or The Cyclic Theory of Continuous Motion, L. Middleditch Co., 1930
- The Secret of Light, 1st ed., 1947, 3rd ed., Univ of Science & Philosophy, 1994, ISBN 1-879605-44-9
- The Message of the Divine Iliad, vol. 1, 1948, vol. 2, 1949
- The Book of Early Whisperings, 1949
- The Home Study Course (with Lao Russell), 1st ed., 1950–52
- Scientific Answer to Human Relations (with Lao Russell), Univ of Science & Philosophy, 1951
- A New Concept of the Universe, Univ of Science & Philosophy, 1953
- Atomic Suicide? (with Lao Russell), Univ of Science & Philosophy, 1957
- The World Crisis: Its Explanation and Solution, (with Lao Russell), Univ of Science & Philosophy, 1958
- The One-World Purpose (with Lao Russell), Univ of Science & Philosophy, 1960
