= Texas Beach =

- Neighborhood of Richmond
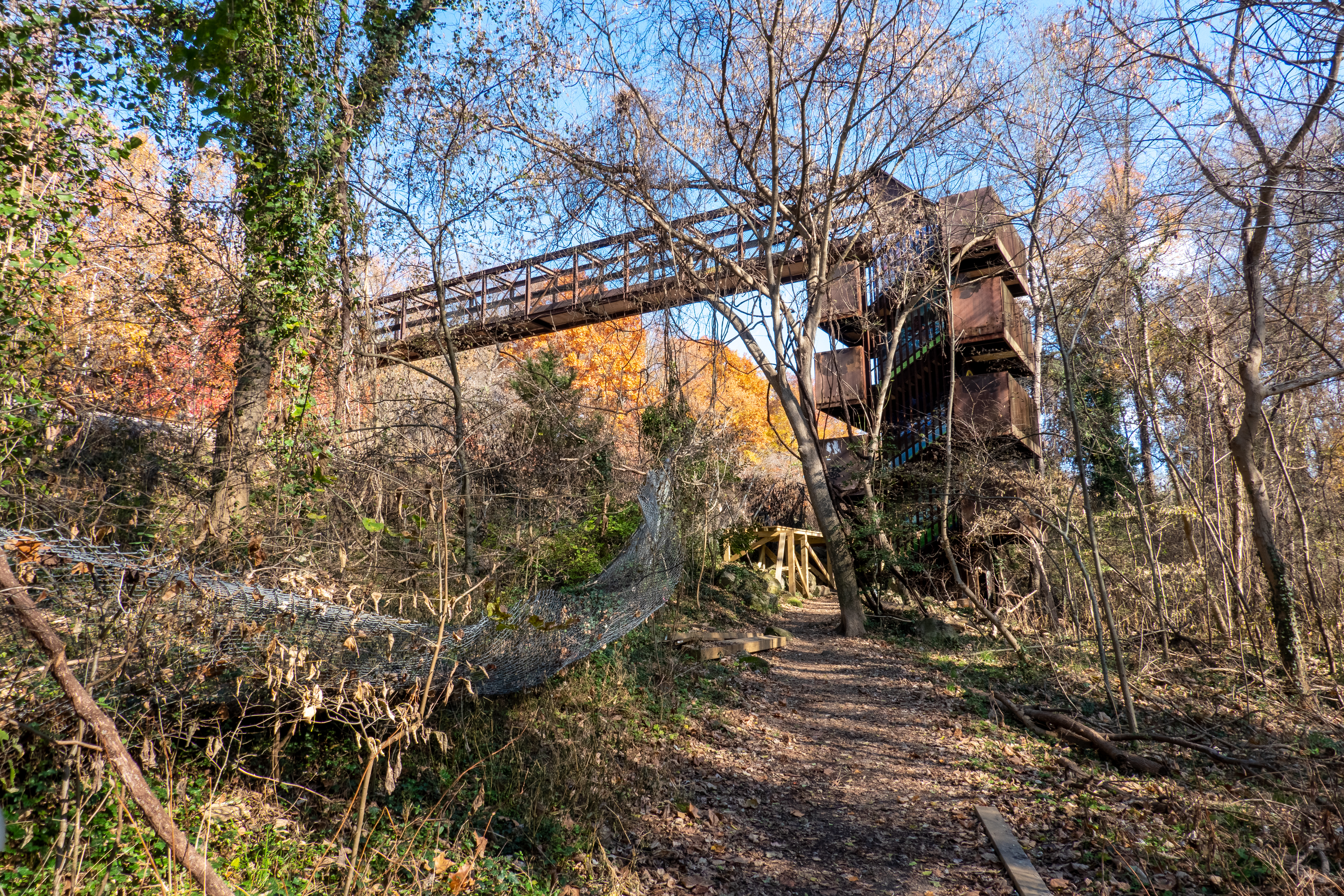
- Interactive map of Texas Beach
- Coordinates: 37°31′48″N 77°28′07″W
- Country: United States
- State: Virginia
- City: Richmond
- Time zone: UTC−04:00 (Eastern Daylight Time)
  - Summer (DST): UTC−05:00 (Eastern Standard Time)
- ZIP code: 23230
- Area code: 804
- ISO 3166 code: 1

Texas Beach in Richmond, Virginia is a riverside area located south of Maymont and west of Hollywood Cemetery. The area is named Texas Beach after Texas Avenue in the Maymont neighborhood, which was the original street to reach the recreation area. Today, it served via the North Bank Trail. The area is home to numerous river beaches, a skatepark, and mountain bike trails.

== See also ==
- Neighborhoods of Richmond, Virginia
- Richmond, Virginia
