= Skateparks in Virginia =

The Commonwealth of Virginia has a spectrum of skateparks, from large parks with high budgets and designs that draw attention from the action sports community across the Mid-Atlantic to smaller DIY skateparks.

== History of Skateparks in Virginia ==
It is hard to provide an exact number of skateparks that exist in Virginia, as skateparks in Virginia have taken many forms of development. As action sports (specifically skateboarding) exploded in popularity in the mid-1990s, enthusiasts didn't wait for the approval and financial support of their cities and counties. Do-it-yourself affairs led the charge of some of the first skateparks in many municipalities. However, even as communities have developed more public skateparks, building DIY skateparks has remained a significant aspect of the culture in the Virginia action sports community, it is not uncommon for areas to have multiple government-funded, public skateparks and DIY skateparks within the same areas. The City of Richmond is a great example of this, as there are multiple public skateparks in the area; in addition, the DIY affairs of the action sports community became so popular that Richmond Parks and Recreation gave land to the Richmond Area Skateboard Alliance to pursue the legal development of a DIY skatepark in the Texas Beach area of the city.

A few of the newest publicly funded skateparks throughout Virginia boast modern design techniques and the sheer acreage to make them noteworthy on an international scale. The Charlottesville Skatepark, the Woodstock Skatepark in Virginia Beach, and the Powhatan Springs Skate Park in Arlington, VA are a few of these contemporary skateparks that sit at the top of the list for anyone looking to explore the skateparks of Virginia.

According to USA Today, one can skate "any season of the year at several indoor and outdoor parks across Virginia with a wide range of elements and levels of difficulty." Indoor skateparks have been an extremely significant development for action sports enthusiasts. Virginia's climate invariably presents weather that can hinder people's ability to enjoy outdoor skateparks consistently throughout the year. The humid, hot days of summer, the frigid temperatures of winter, and the rainy periods that come and go all present obstacles for those looking to progress their skills. Throughout the 2010s, many of the indoor skateparks closed. As of 2021, Liberty Mountain Skatepark in Lynchburg, Virginia and Mekos Skatepark in Hampton, Virginia are the only two public indoor facilities that are still operating.

=== Virginia Skate Park Directory ===
Skatepark	Image	Dates	Location	City, State	Notes
Ashland Skatepark		2004 opened	Pufferbelly Park 37.757433°N 77.473196°W	Ashland	Modular Ramps
Bedford Skatepark			Falling Creek Rd. 37.312910°N 79.503928°W	Bedford	Concrete
Brown Park			7461 Foster Road Gloucester, VA 23061	Gloucester	Wooden halfpipe, concrete street section
Blacksburg Skatepark			725 Patrick Henry Dr. 37.241902°N 80.410594°W	Blacksburg	Concrete
Powhatan Springs Skatepark			6020 Wilson Blvd, Arlington, VA 22205	Arlington	Concrete
Dulles South Skatepark			24950 Riding Center Dr. 38.921631°N 77.526287°W	Chantilly	5,600 square feet (520 m^{2})
Charlottesville Skatepark			38.044745°N 78.477423°W	Charlottesville	Concrete
Chesapeake Skatepark			36.751885°N 76.230201°W	Chesapeake	Blend of modular ramps and concrete features
Christiansburg Skatepark			569 N. Franklin St. 37.137361°N 80.413312°W	Christiansburg, Virginia	Blend of modular ramps and concrete features
Fort Belvoir Skatepark			38.694534°N 77.141497°W	Fort Belvoir	Modular ramps
Laurel Skatepark			37.644071°N 77.508550°W	Glen Allen	Modular ramps
GBS Skatepark			760 Main ST. Edgehill shopping center	Gloucester	Modular ramps
Woodland Skatepark			37.026560°N 76.324537°W	Hampton	Metal modular ramps
Herndon's Skatepark			38.978288°N 77.398188°W	Herndon, Virginia	Concrete
Hopewell Skatepark			1022 Crestview Drive 37.300790°N 77.289604°W	Hopewell	Modular ramps
Cactonin Circle Skatepark			39.106884°N 77.559263°W	Leesburg	Concrete
Rotary Centennial Riverfront Skatepark			29 9th St. 37.417171°N 79.141032°W	Lynchburg	Mostly concrete with wooden mini ramp, and modular ramps
Liberty Mountain Skatepark			3700 Candlers Mountain Rd.	Lynchburg	Indoor, wooden ramps
Northside Skatepark			8401 Tidewater Drive	Norfolk	Concrete
Mekos Skatepark			3420 Von Schilling Dr, Hampton, VA 23666	Norfolk	Indoor skatepark, wooden ramps
Carter Jones Skatepark		2013 opened	2813 Bainbridge Street 37.516519°N 77.460169°W	Richmond	Open 24 hours year-round; aka Fonticello Skate Park. Concrete
Texas Beach Skatepark		2018 opened	37.532143°N 77.468639°W	Richmond	DIY; open 24 hours. Concrete
RVA South Side Skatepark			Old Carnation St. 37.499012°N 77.511927°W	Richmond	Wooden ramps now removed, fully renovated with concrete, modern design.
Rocky Mount Skatepark			37.014112°N 79.894679°W	Rocky Mount	Metal modular ramps
Moyer Skatepark			37.281781°N 80.057292°W	Salem	Array of concrete, wooden, and metal features.
Wakefield Park Skatepark			38.817580°N 77.224438°W	Annandale	Two separate skate parks. One is of modular ramps, the other is new concrete.
Williams Farm Skatepark			5269 Learning Circle 36.864023°N 76.159463°W	Virginia Beach	25,000 square feet (2,300 m^{2}). Concrete.
Woodstock Skate Plaza			5709 Providence Road 36.812162°N 76.193230°W	Virginia Beach	10,400 square feet (970 m^{2}). Concrete.
Mount Trashmore Skatepark			310 Edwin Dr. 36.830833°N 76.120424°W	Virginia Beach	24,000 square feet (2,200 m^{2}) Modular ramps.
WRV Skatepark			1900 Cypress Ave	Virginia Beach	Wooden features on asphalt ground.
Warrenton Skatepark			800 Waterloo Road 38.718844°N 77.819294°W	Warrenton	Modular ramps
James City County Skatepark			Longhill Rd. 37.296587°N 76.738043°W	Williamsburg	Old concrete
Scott D. Eagles Memorial Skatepark			38.641294°N 77.249846°W 14300 Featherstone Rd.	Woodbridge	Concrete
Lake Fairfax Skatepark			1400 Lake Fairfax Dr	Reston	Concrete
Schuyler Hamilton Jones Skatepark			3540 Wheeler Ave	Alexandria	Wooden modular ramps
Front Royal Skatepark			100 Kerfoot Ave	Front Royal	Concrete
Luray Skatepark			625 6th St	Luray	Modular ramps
Hawksbill Skatepark			178 Karl Jenkins Ave	Stanley	Concrete
Westover Skatepark			305 S Dogwood Dr,	Harrisonburg	Modular ramps
Stanton Skatepark			10660 Western Ave	Stanton	Well kept modular ramps
Yowell Meadow Park			230 W Piedmont St	Culpeper	Concrete
J. Frank Wilson Memorial Park			502 E Church St	Martinsville	Metal modular ramps
Pole Green Skatepark			8813 Pole Green Park Ln	Mechanicsville	Modular ramps
Bath County Skatepark			65 Panther Dr,	Hot Springs	Modular ramps
Clifton Forge Skatepark			1062 Vulcan Ave #814	Clifton Forge	Wooden modular ramps

== See also ==
- List of skateparks (world-wide)
