= Maymont =

Historic estate and gardens in Richmond, Virginia, United States

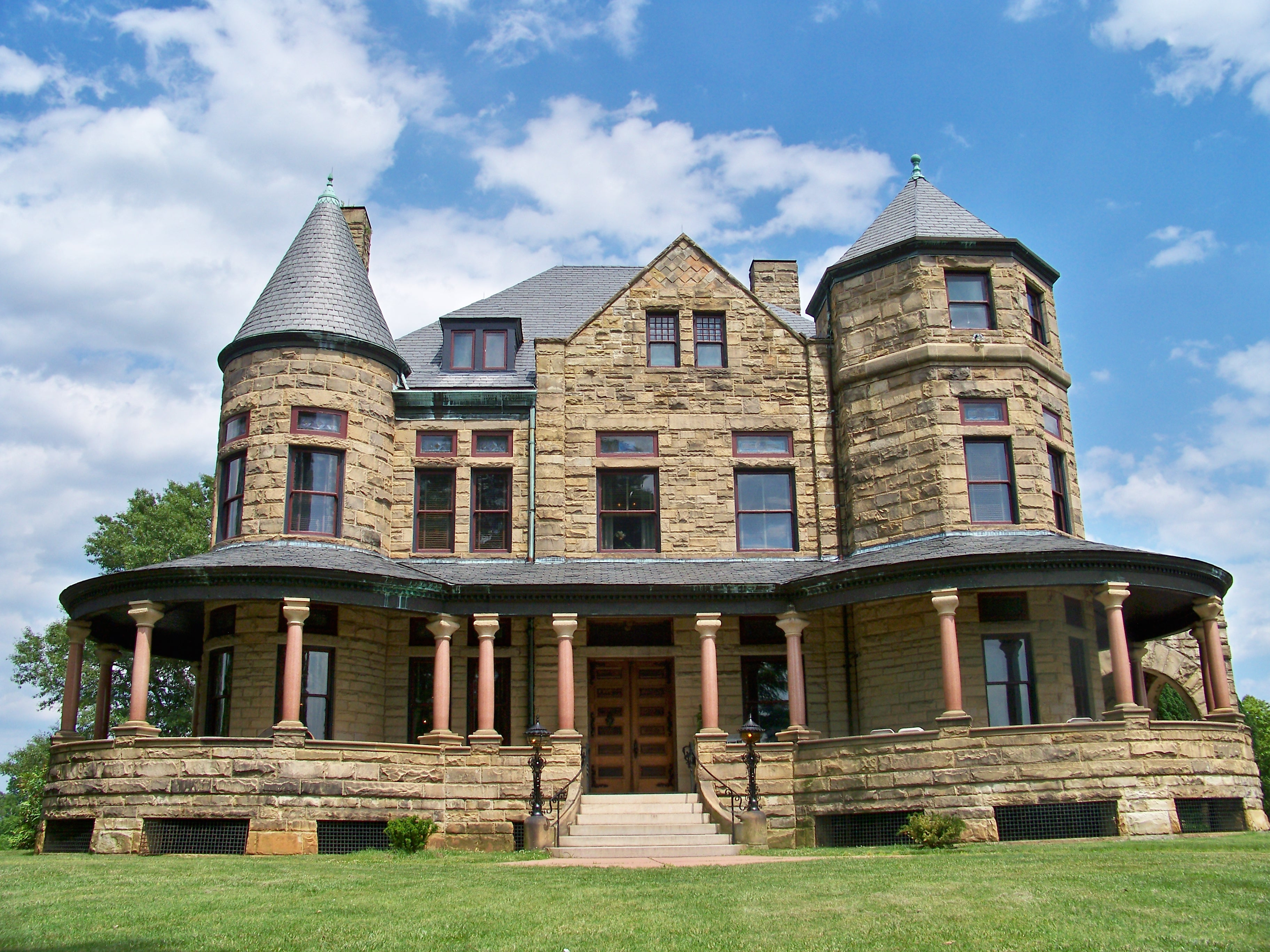
- Maymont Mansion was originally owned by James H. Dooley and his wife Sallie.
- Interactive map of Maymont
- Location: Entrances at 2201 Shields Lake Drive, 1700 Hampton Street, Richmond, Virginia
- Area: 100 acres (40 ha)
- Created: 1925
- Operator: Maymont Foundation
- Visitors: 527,153 (in 2013)
- Open: Year-round
- Website: maymont.org
- Maymont
- U.S. National Register of Historic Places
- Virginia Landmarks Register
- Coordinates: 37°32′5″N 77°28′43″W
- Area: 100 acres (40.5 ha)
- Built: 1890
- Architect: Edgerton S. Rogers
- NRHP reference No.: 71001062
- VLR No.: 127-0182

Significant dates
- Added to NRHP: December 16, 1971
- Designated VLR: July 6, 1971

Maymont is a 100-acre (40 ha) Victorian estate and public park in Richmond, Virginia. It contains Maymont Mansion, now a historic house museum, an arboretum, an Italian and Japanese garden, a carriage collection, native wildlife exhibits, a nature center, and a petting zoo.

In 1893, James H. Dooley, a wealthy Richmond lawyer and philanthropist, and his wife, Sallie, completed their elaborate Gilded Age estate on a site high above the James River. According to their wishes, after their deaths Maymont was left to the people of Richmond. Over the next 75 years, additional attractions were added.

== History ==
Maymont was named for James Dooley's wife, Sallie May. Construction of the mansion completed in 1893. The Dooleys also built a summer home on Afton Mountain, Swannanoa, which was completed in 1913. In 2011, Maymont was named one of the top 10 public spaces by the American Planning Association.

== Gardens ==
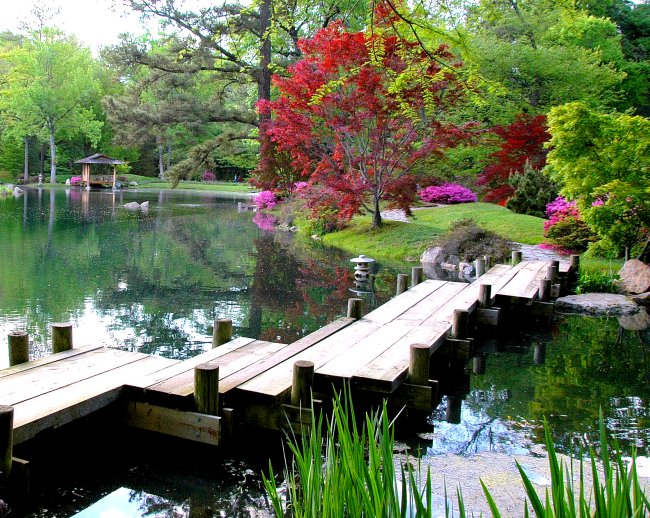
Japanese garden at Maymont

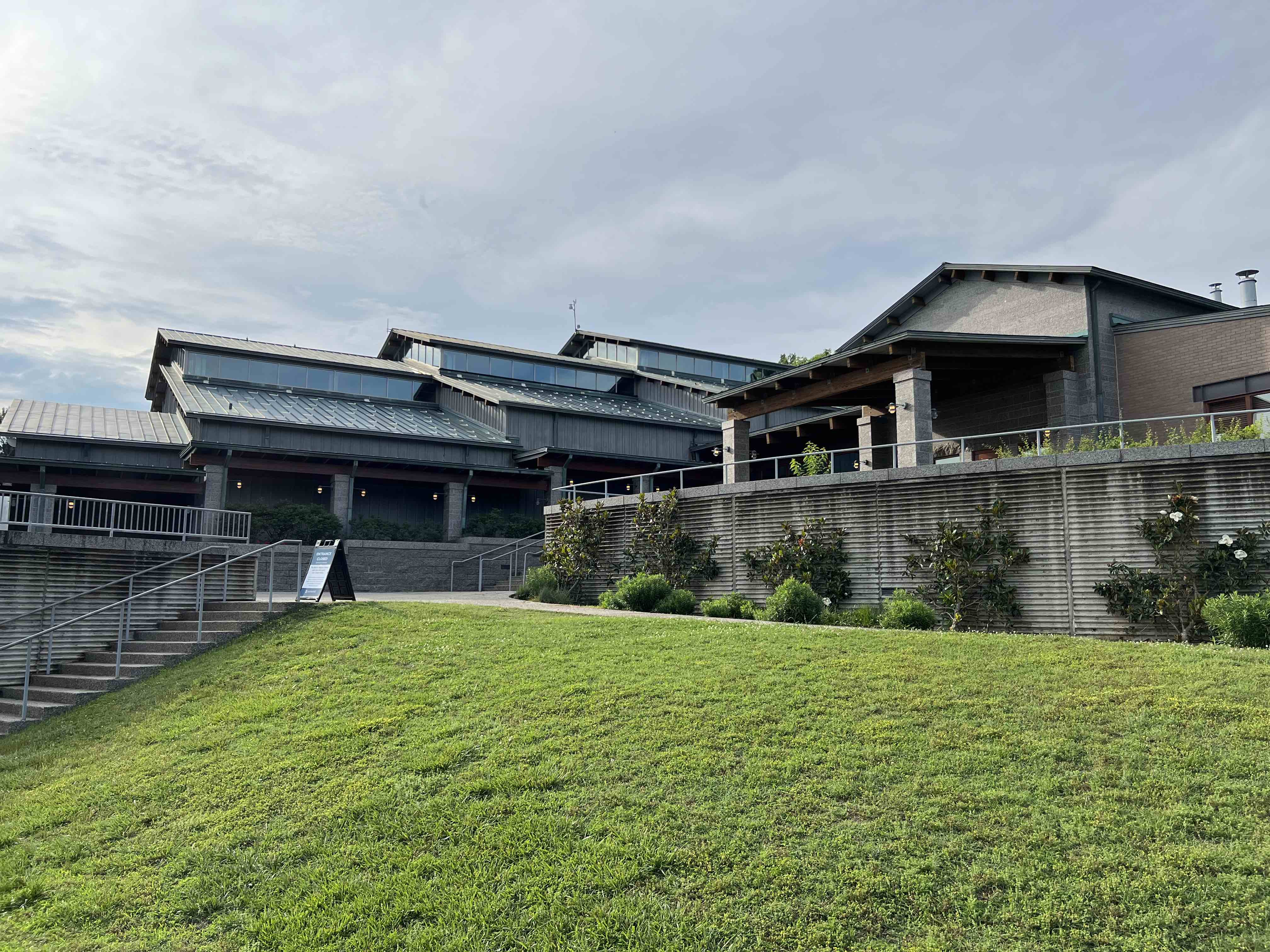
Robins Nature Center.

The Japanese Garden at Maymont is well tended and features a koi pond and a large waterfall. The Japanese Garden also has a torii arch, rock gardens, and various red maples. It is a blend of two different time periods and a mixture of many styles of gardens. In 1911, a section of the Kanawha Canal was bought to be a part of the garden.

Years following Mrs. Dooley's passing, the Japanese garden increasingly lost its magnificence and design. The garden still has its stonework and winding watercourse that leads to its large pond. After realizing the decline of the quality of the garden, Earth Design renovated it in 1978. The new design of the Japanese is considered a "stroll garden" which offers guests at Maymont to see how the changing impact of nature has on the grounds.

Created by Noland and Baskervill of Richmond (now Baskervill), The Italian Garden features a pergola, fountains, urns and roses. The creators of the garden modeled their design after the 15th and 16th century Italian classical style. The garden is laid out on many levels, facing the south which once overlooked the James River. The design of the Cascade and the Fountain Court is patterned like the Villa Torlonia near Rome. The Italian Garden was completed in 1910, when the Petersburg granite stonework was laid down.

The arboretum contains more than 200 species of trees and woody plants. It includes a number of "exotic champions" including a Cedrus atlantica, Cryptomeria japonica, Parrotia persica, and Tilia × europaea. Some examples of exotic flora that are on grounds include false larch (Pseudolarix amabilis) from Japan; and Enkianthus campanulatus and Enkianthus perulatus from China. This is credited to the same landscaper who helped with the design of the Italian garden, Henry E. Baskervill. Credit goes to the Dooleys as well, who had the final say on the estates design.

Maymont's gardens are popular for outdoor weddings focused around the Italian Garden, the Japanese Garden and numerous gazebos located throughout the grounds. There are ten specialty gardens as well. There is the "Marie's Butterfly Garden" that was finished in 2009. It starts east of the Children's Farm and goes along the horse and cow pastures, down to the Bobcat Habitat. Examples of flowers include yarrow, butterfly weed, cone flowers, butterfly bushes, sunflowers, and blue spirea. There is also an Herb Garden on grounds which was donated by the Richmond Council of Garden Clubs in 1957. It has been maintained by the Old Dominion Herb Society since 1978.

== Fauna ==
In addition to the farm animals that it keeps in the Children's Farm, Maymont is the permanent home of several animals that are native to the Commonwealth. Many of these have been injured and are otherwise unable to live in the wild. These animals include a bald eagle, a bobcat, two black bears, and a fox. Visitors are also able to see elk and American bison. A nature center is also on the grounds, which exhibits many aquatic animals found in and around Virginia such as otters, alligators, and sharks. Throughout the park, Canada geese, American snapping turtles, deer, numerous species of snakes, and American bullfrogs can be found wild.

== Gallery ==
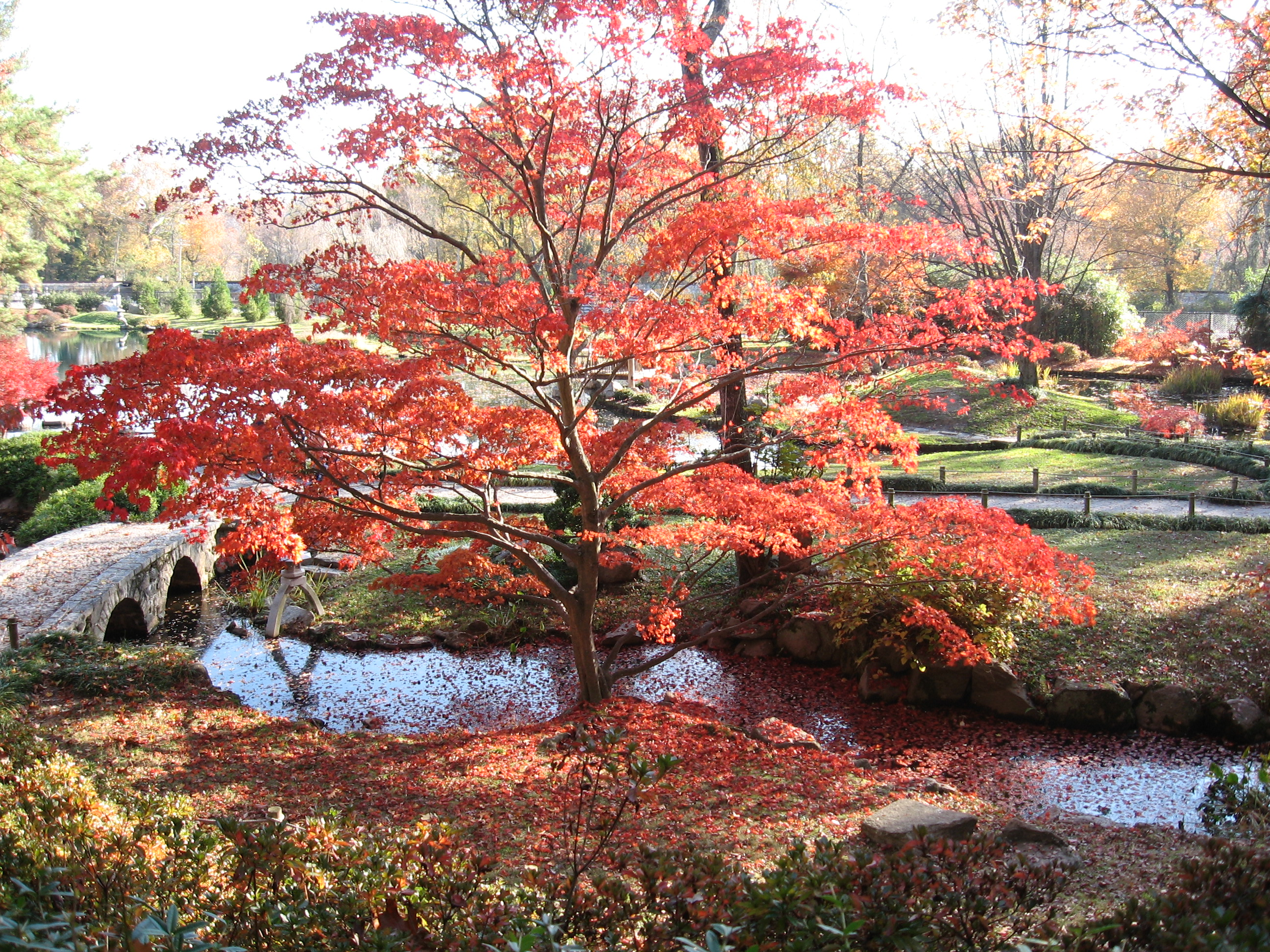
A view from Maymont.

Maymont in the winter.

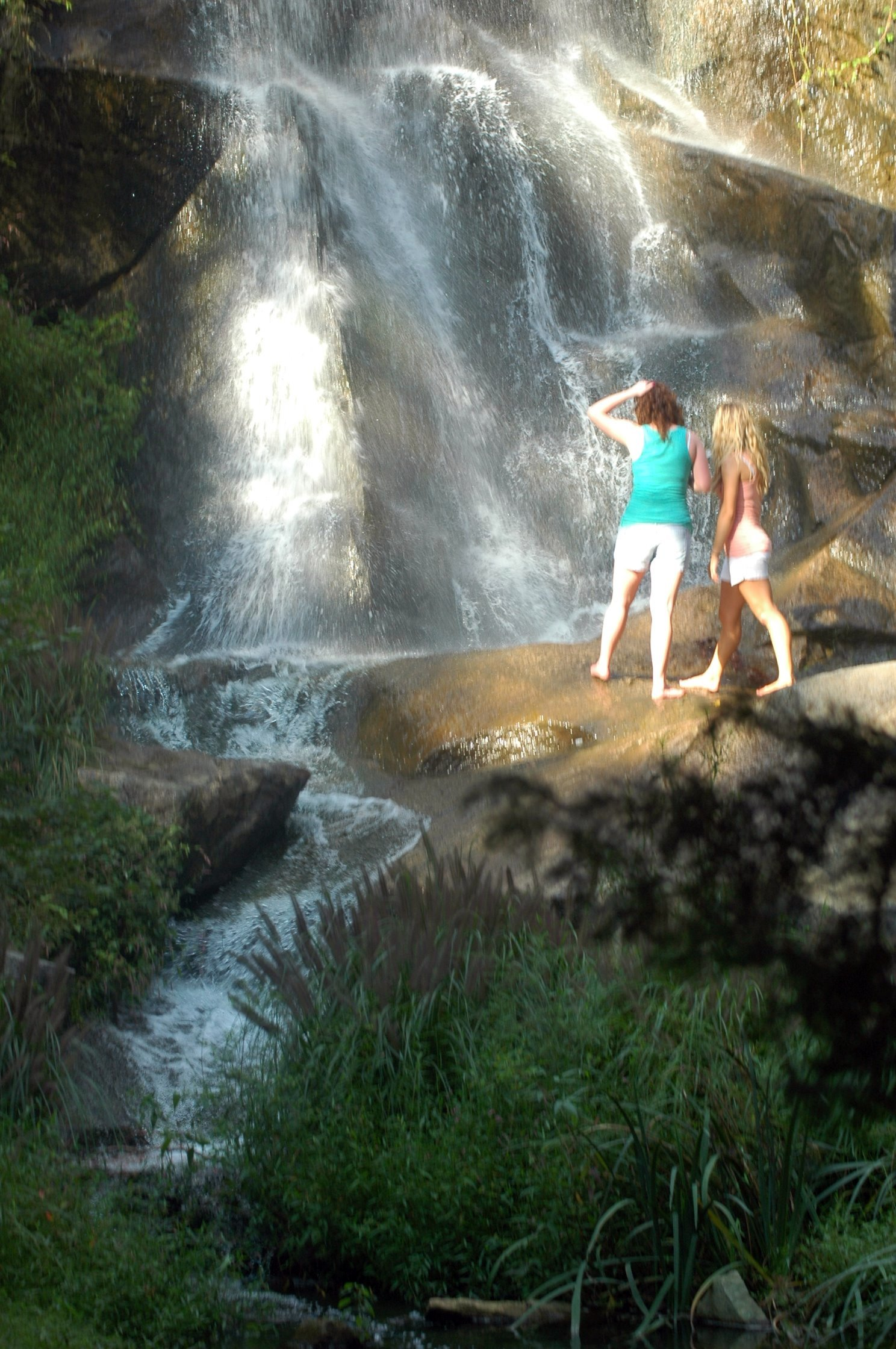
Waterfalls at the park.

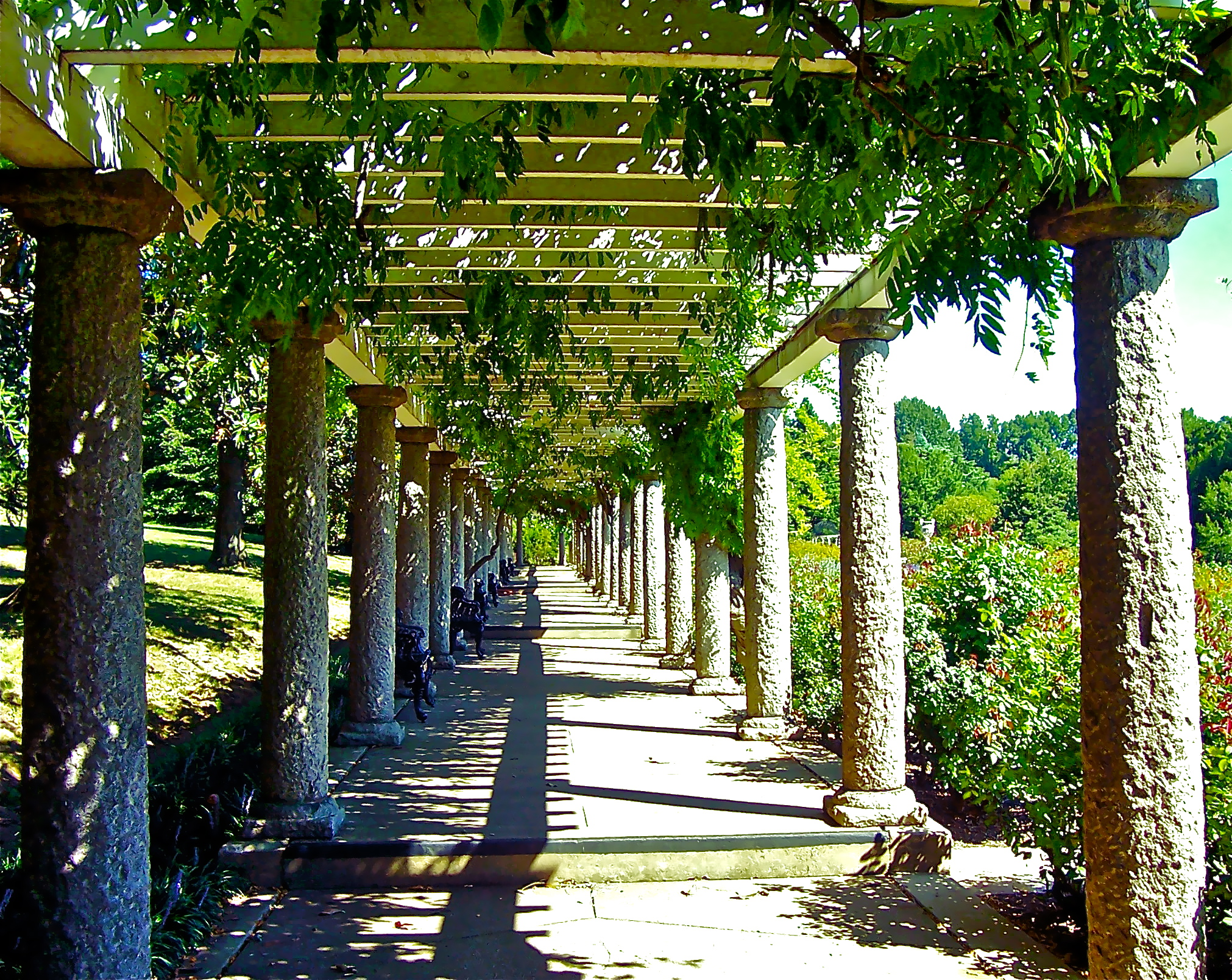
Wisteria covered pergola

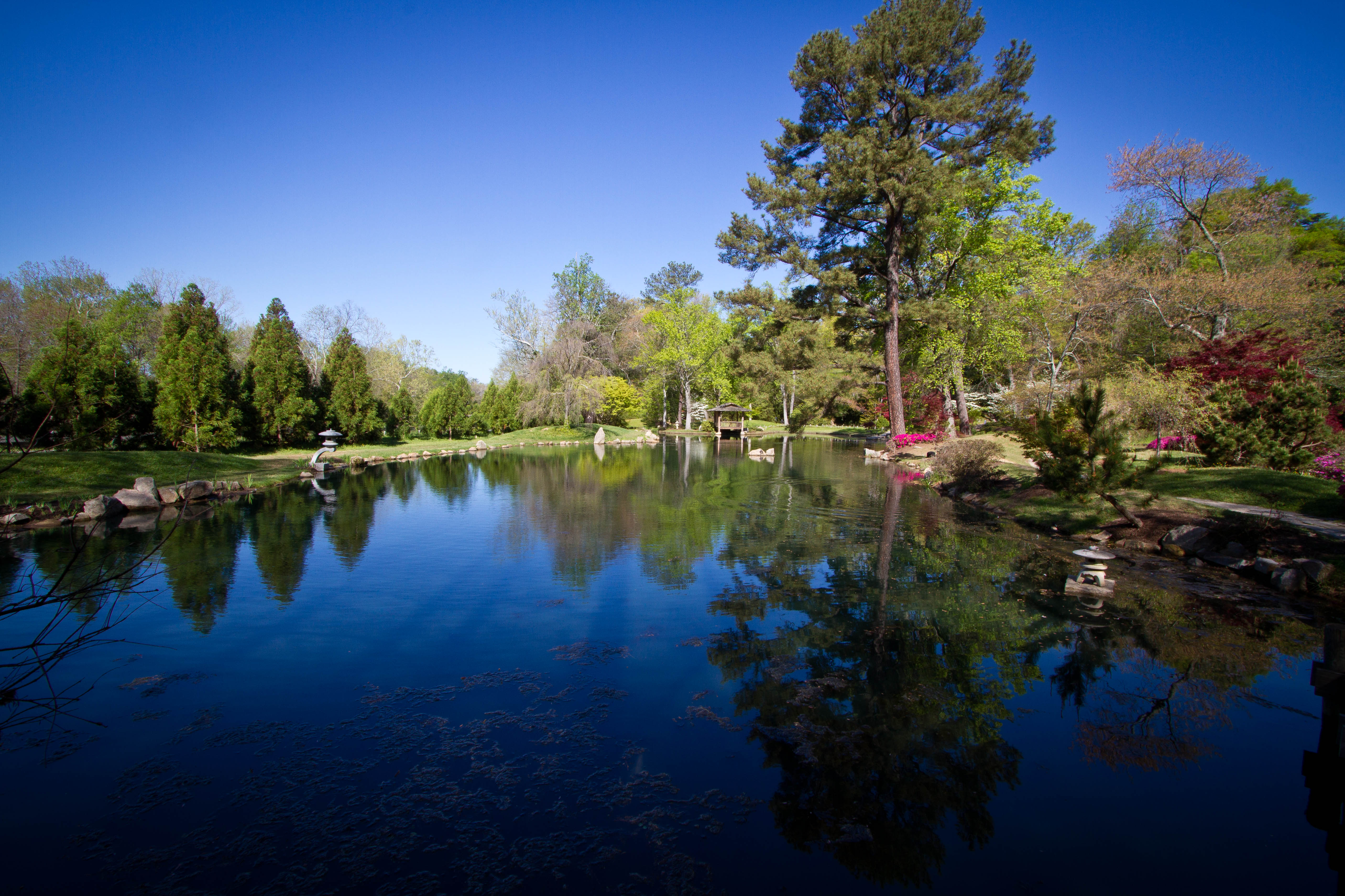
Pond in the park.

== See also ==
- List of botanical gardens in the United States
- National Register of Historic Places listings in Richmond, Virginia
