= Hotel Colorado =

Historic hotel in Colorado, US

- U.S. National Register of Historic Places
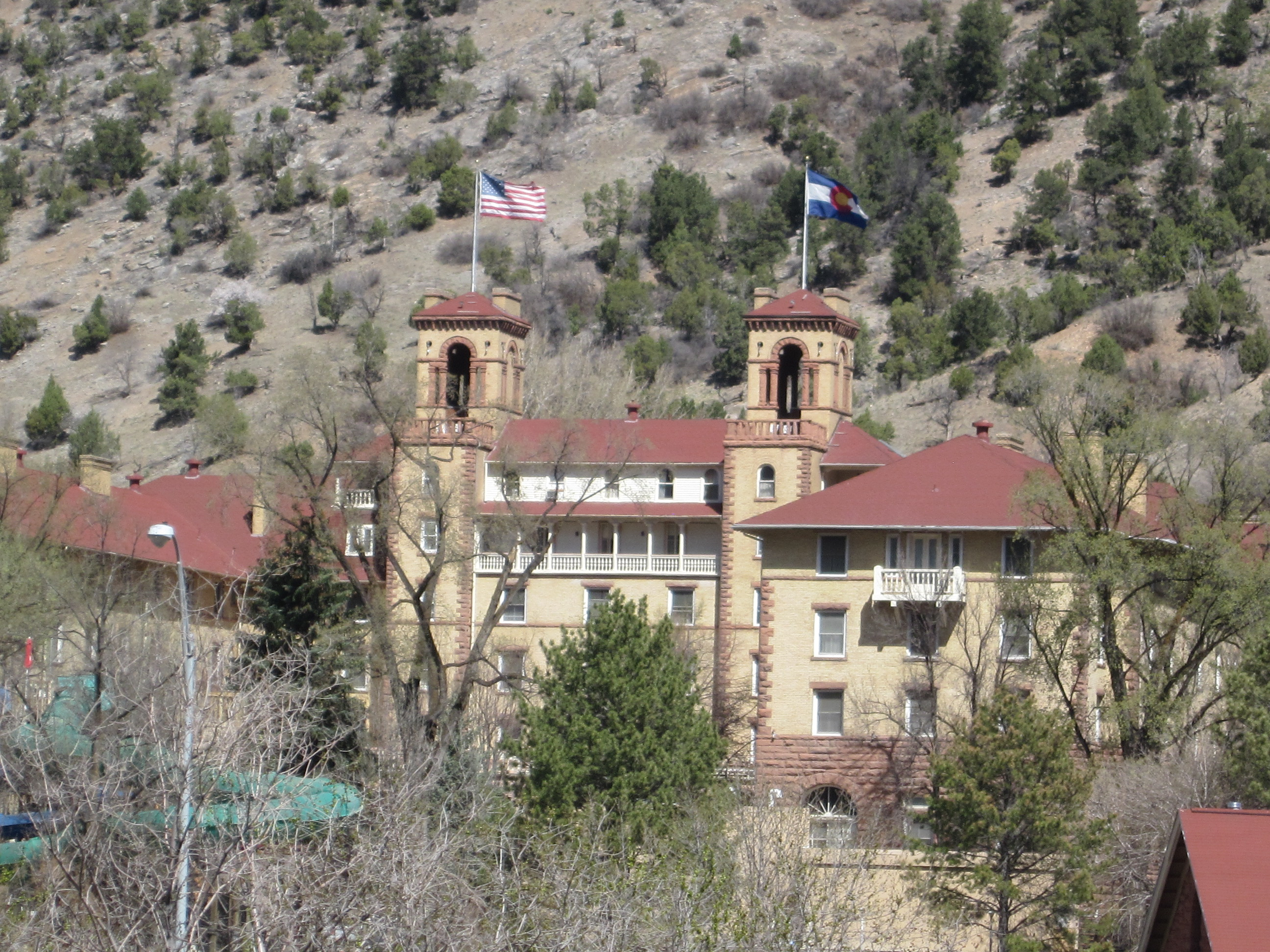
- Location: 526 Pine Street; Glenwood Springs, CO 81601
- Coordinates: 39°33′3.1″N 107°19′28.9″W
- Built: 1893
- Architect: Boring, Tilton and Mellon
- Architectural style: Italianate
- NRHP reference No.: 77000376
- Added to NRHP: 1977-05-26

Hotel Colorado is an 1893 Italianate structure in Glenwood Springs, Colorado, United States, and one of the oldest hotels in Colorado.

== History ==
Established by silver magnate and banker Walter Devereux, construction began in 1891 at a cost of $850,000. William A. Boring and Edward Lippincott Tilton of the New York City architecture firm Boring & Tilton designed the building as a replica of the Villa de Medici. Mr. Boring, one of the most prominent American architects of the time, was a member of the National Academy of Design and was notable for designing Ellis Island and numerous buildings along Park Avenue before becoming the dean of Columbia University's Graduate School of Architecture, Planning and Preservation."". Local materials used include cream-colored Roman brick and Peach Blow Sandstone; imported items included 12,000 yards of carpet and 2,000 rose bushes. The Hotel Colorado opened on June 10, 1893 to a program including a fireworks display, an orchestra in the ballroom, and dining at midnight for the 300 couples in attendance.

The hotel quickly became a popular summer retreat, earning the nickname of "the little White House of the West" after extended visits by Presidents Theodore Roosevelt and William Howard Taft. The teddy bear is alleged to have been invented during President Roosevelt's 1905 visit when the hotel's maids presented him with a stuffed bear pieced together with scraps of fine material.

On September 16, 1925, live music and speech was broadcast by way of telephone from the hotel's ballroom to Denver radio station KOA.

In 1942, the hotel was leased to the United States Navy for use as a hospital. The U.S. Naval Convalescent Hospital was commissioned on July 5, 1943 and served over 6,500 patients by the end of 1945. The hospital was decommissioned in 1946.

In 2003, a time capsule was buried in the courtyard. It is scheduled to be opened in 2043.

Historic Hotels of America, an official program of the National Trust for Historic Preservation, added the Hotel Colorado to its list in April 2007.

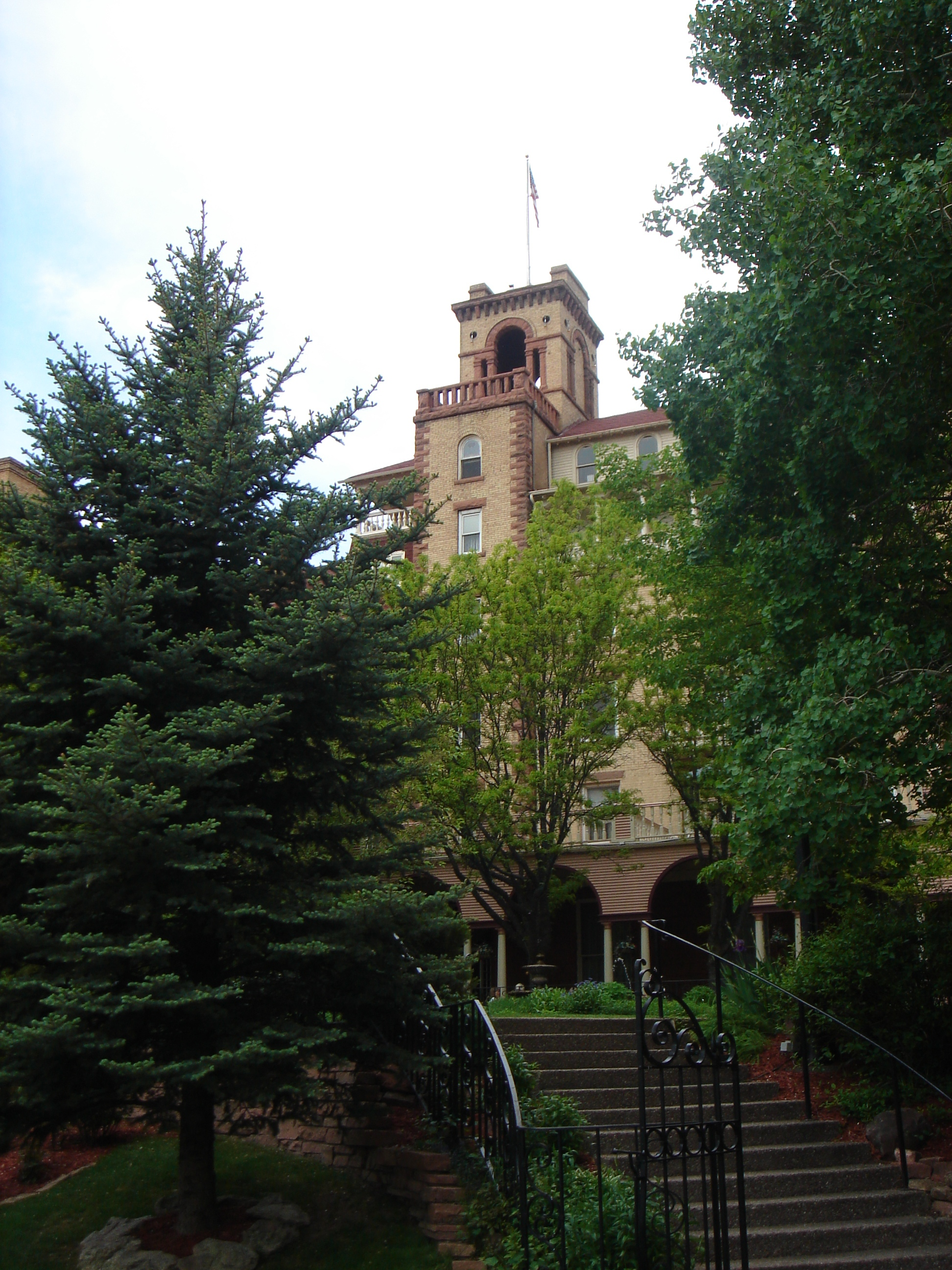
Partial exterior view of the Hotel Colorado as it stands today.

== Famous visitors ==
- Al Capone
- Buffalo Bill
- David Moffat
- Doc Holliday
- Evalyn Walsh McLean
- Franklin Delano Roosevelt
- Herbert Hoover
- Howard Taft
- Jay Gould
- "Diamond Jack" Alterie
- Molly Brown
- Nat Goodwin
- Theodore Roosevelt
- Tom Mix, actor, during the filming of The Great K & A Train Robbery in summer 1926.
- Warren Harding

=== Ghosts ===
Several ghosts are believed to reside there, notably a young girl in Victorian clothing seen playing with a ball, a female that peers over sleeping male guests, and a male presence on the fifth floor. The two suites in the bell towers are frequently reported to be haunted. The elevator moving on its own without passengers, strange smells and sounds have also been reported by guests and staff. In September 2006, CCPI Paranormal Investigations visited the hotel and recorded two areas of higher electromagnetic energy, one in the corridor in front of room 325 and the other outside room 551.

The screams of a woman are often heard throughout the hotel, believed to be of a chamber maid who was involved in a love triangle, and was murdered by one of her lovers. The room in which the woman was believed to have been murdered was a guestroom, it has now been turned into a storage room, due to the history of paranormal happenings occurring there.

== See also ==
- National Register of Historic Places listings in Garfield County, Colorado
- Swannanoa (mansion): Another structure inspired by the Villa Medici.
