= James H. Dooley =

American politician

- Born: January 17, 1841; Richmond, Virginia
- Died: November 16, 1922 (aged 81); Richmond, Virginia
- Education: Georgetown University
- Occupation: Lawyer
- Known for: Organizing railroads; building Maymont and Swannanoa; philanthropy

James Henry Dooley (January 17, 1841 – November 16, 1922) was a Virginia lawyer, business leader, politician, and philanthropist based in Richmond during Reconstruction and the Gilded Age. He represented Richmond in the Virginia House of Delegates for three terms.

== Early life ==
James Henry Dooley was the son of Irish immigrants John and Sarah Dooley. He was born in Richmond, Virginia, one of nine children. His father, John Dooley Sr. was a successful hat manufacturer. The Dooley family was prominent in the community and the parish of St. Peter's Roman Catholic Church.

Dooley attended Georgetown College (now Georgetown University) and became the first student to rank at the head of his class during each of his four years, graduating in 1860. Soon after, James and his brother John enlisted in the Confederate Army, joining their father's unit, the First Virginia Infantry. James Dooley was wounded at the Battle of Williamsburg during the Peninsula Campaign in May 1862. He was captured and confined for a short time. Upon his release, Dooley worked in the Confederate Ordnance Department in Richmond. After the war, Dooley completed a Master of Arts degree at Georgetown, then returned to Richmond.

== Career ==
During the postwar years, as Richmond began to rebuild its business district, Dooley began a legal career. Upon his father's death in 1868, James Dooley started using his father's honorific "Major," although he himself never attained that rank. The following year, Dooley married Sarah ("Sallie") O. May of Staunton, Virginia in Augusta County, although she remained an Episcopalian. Dooley was elected to the Virginia General Assembly and served from 1871 to 1877.

Dooley also invested in real estate and became involved in railroads, insurance, steel, and banking. In 1880, Dooley joined the board of directors of the Richmond and Danville Railroad, which soon expanded into a multi-state system of over 8,000 miles. During this period of expansion Dooley served on the board of directors of the Richmond and West Point Terminal Railway and Warehouse Company. During the panic of 1893 when the Danville system faced bankruptcy, the company was reorganized by Drexel Morgan and Company of New York into the new Southern Railway Company. Dooley was later a founder of the Seaboard Air Line Railroad. In 1909, Dooley was elected to the board of the [Chesapeake and Ohio Railway].

In 1893, Major Dooley had a large stone mansion built on a large estate overlooking the James River in [Henrico County, west of Richmond], which he and his wife named Maymont. By 1912 the Dooleys also completed an enormous mountain retreat, Swannanoa, in the Blue Ridge Mountains at Rockfish Gap near Waynesboro, Virginia in Nelson County.

According to Richmond's Maymont Foundation, "Major Dooley's leadership of various civic endeavors runs as a continuous thread through the history of Richmond, from the early 1870s through the early 1920s." He succeeded his father as a board member of St. Joseph's Orphanage. In 1881, he helped raise money for relief in Ireland. Dooley also served on the board of the Medical College of Virginia and, in 1919, gave the funds to construct the Dooley Hospital (now part of Virginia Commonwealth University).

== Death and legacy ==
James Dooley died in Richmond at the age of 81. He was interred in Hollywood Cemetery, and later reinterred with his wife Sallie in a mausoleum at Maymont.

James Dooley is still considered one of the largest donors in the history of the Diocese of Richmond. His family had long supported Catholic causes. His father (the original Major) had supported St. Joseph's Orphanage; his brother John attended Georgetown Seminary but died in 1873 before ordination; and his sister Sarah entered the Visitation monastery in Richmond. The Dooleys, who were themselves childless, left a record 3 million dollars to the St. Joseph's Orphanage, which permitted it to build "St. Joseph's Villa" on the North Side of Richmond in Henrico County. The charitable organization continues to serve families and children today.

James Dooley left their home, Maymont, to the City of Richmond, to be used as a park and museum after Mrs. Dooley's death. Today, Maymont is a major Richmond attraction on the James River, with a museum, formal gardens, native wildlife exhibits, nature center, carriage collection, and children's farm and petting zoo.

Mrs. Sallie Dooley gave Swannanoa to her husband's two remaining sisters upon her death, and while it subsequently changed ownership several times, the mansion remains, and like Maymont is listed on the National Register of Historic Places. She also gave a half million dollars to build the Crippled Children's Hospital in Richmond (later the Children's Hospital of Richmond) and another half million dollars to build the Richmond Public Library as a memorial to her husband.

== Works ==
- Dooley, J. H., Daniel, J. W., & Daniel, J. W. (1891). Payment of gold contracts in silver : correspondence between James H. Dooley and U.S. Senator John W. Daniel. Richmond, Va: J.L. Hill Printing Co. OCLC 20986959.
- Dooley, J. H. (1900). How may state receive return for money spent on education. S.l: s.n. OCLC 13420088.
- Dooley, J. H. (1902). Has our country passed the climax of its prosperity? A reply ... to the address of Mr. F.A. Vanderlip, New York, N.Y., at Wilmington, N.C.. OCLC 26773592
- Dooley, J. H. (1911). A national constitutional convention and its possible consequences. What limitations can be imposed upon the powers of a convention called to amend the Constitution of the United States?. OCLC 78952562.

== See also ==
- Caravati, C. M. (1978). Major Dooley. Richmond, Va: [Published for the Maymont Foundation]. OCLC 4562489.
