= William A. Boring =

American architect (1859–1937)

William Boring
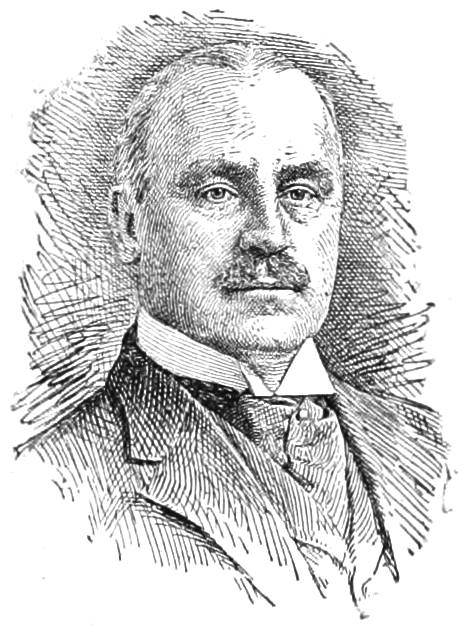
- Born: September 9, 1859; Carlinville, Illinois
- Died: May 5, 1937 (aged 77); New York City
- Occupation: Architect
- Practice: Boring and Tilton
- Buildings: Ellis Island

Signature
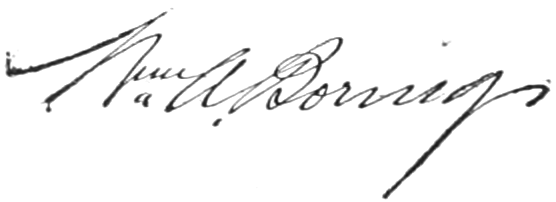

William Alciphron Boring (September 9, 1859 – May 5, 1937) was an American architect noted for co-designing the Immigration Station at Ellis Island in New York harbor.

== Career ==
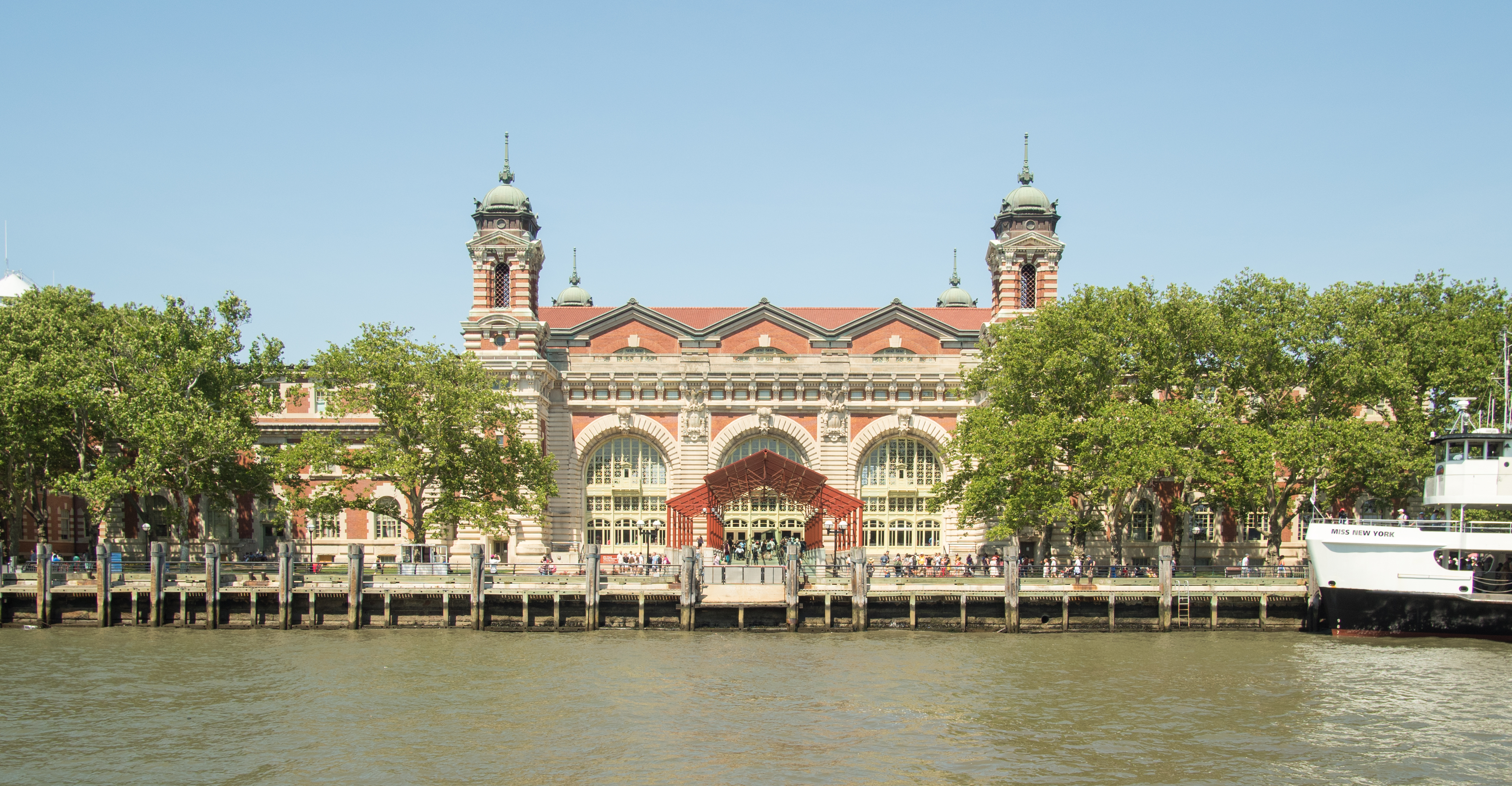
Ellis Island

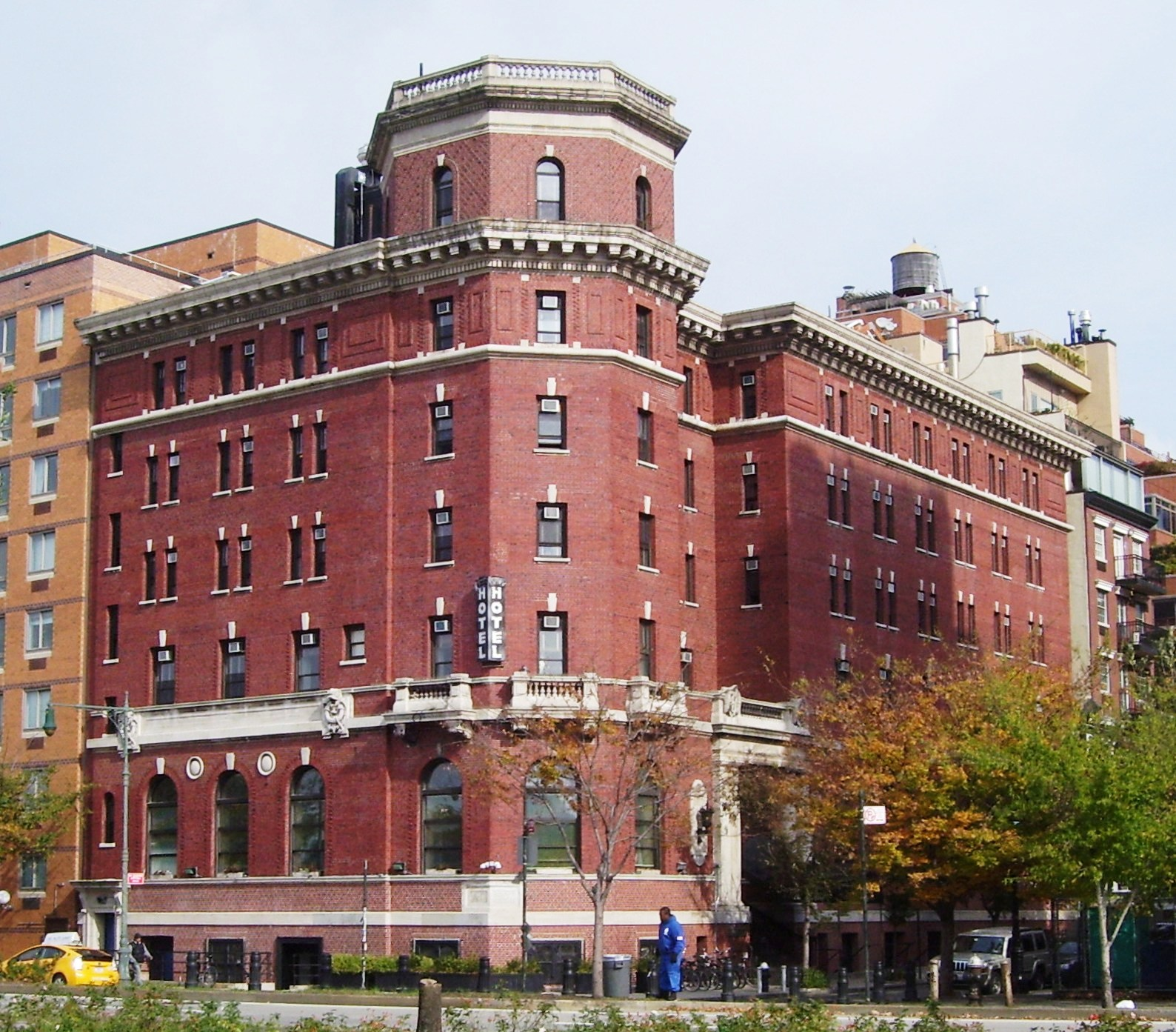
The American Seamen's Friend Society Sailors' Home and Institute, now "The Jane", a boutique hotel

Boring studied first at the University of Illinois, then spent an additional year (1885) as a student at Columbia University. In 1886, he maintained a partnership in Los Angeles with architects Solomon I. Haas (1857–1945) and E.L. Caukins. From 1887 to 1890, Boring studied architecture at the École des Beaux-Arts in Paris along with his friend Edward Lippincott Tilton. Boring and Tilton returned to New York in 1890 to work in the office of McKim, Mead, and White.

In 1891, Boring and Tilton left McKim, Mead, and White to form their own architectural partnership. Among their notable works were the Casino in Belle Haven, Connecticut (1891) and the Hotel Colorado in the resort town of Glenwood Springs, Colorado (1891). The partnership's work culminated in the 1897 design for the new federal Immigration Station at Ellis Island. This work was honored with a gold medal for Architecture at the Exposition Universelle, Paris (1900); a gold medal at the Pan-American Exposition, Buffalo (1901); and a silver medal at the Louisiana Purchase Exposition, St. Louis (1904). The partnership of Boring & Tilton ended in 1904. The men started working independently of one another but continued to share offices and equipment until 1915. In 1913, Boring was elected into the National Academy of Design as an Associate member.

In 1916, Boring joined the faculty of the Columbia School of Architecture, where he eventually became Director in 1919 and Dean from 1931 to 1932. As dean of architecture at Columbia Boring, and especially his successor Joseph Hudnut, encouraged the then-nascent modernism and incorporated studies in town planning.

== Works ==
=== Early works ===
- Fire House Number 1, now a state historic site known as the Old Plaza Firehouse; Los Angeles, California, 1884

=== With Edward Lippincott Tilton ===
- 1891: Casino, Belle Haven, Connecticut
- 1891–1893: Hotel Colorado, Glenwood Springs, Colorado (placed on the List of Registered Historic Places in Colorado)
- 1896: Morristown School, Morristown, New Jersey (Morristown–Beard School today)
- 1897–1901: United States Immigrant Station, on Ellis Island in the Port of New York (added to the Statue of Liberty National Monument on May 11, 1965, placed on the National Register of Historic Places on October 15, 1966
- 1899: Town Hall, East Orange, New Jersey
- 1902–1903: Astor Warehouse, 29–35 Ninth Avenue, Manhattan, New York City
- 1900–1905: Tome School for Boys, Port Deposit, Maryland
- 1901: Marine barracks, Brooklyn Navy Yard, Brooklyn, New York City
- 1904–1905: Brooklyn Heights Casino, Fort Hill Estate, Brooklyn, New York City
- 1917: Lemmonier Library, University of Notre Dame, Notre Dame, Indiana

=== Solo designs ===
- 1906: apartment building at 520 Park Avenue in Manhattan (demolished in 1932)
- 1907–1908: American Seamen's Friend Society Sailors' Home and Institute, 505 507 West Street, Manhattan
- 1907–1908: St. Agatha's School for Girls, later St. Agnes Boys High School, 555 West End Avenue, Manhattan (landmark, 2016 condos)
- 1909: apartment building at 540 Park Avenue in Manhattan, New York City
- 1910: Casino Mansion Apartments, 200 Hicks Street, Brooklyn, New York City
- 1911: apartment building at 521 Park Avenue in Manhattan, New York City
