= Swannanoa (mansion) =

Historic house in Virginia, United States

- U.S. National Register of Historic Places
- Virginia Landmarks Register

- Location within Virginia Location within the United States
- Location: S of jct. of State Route 610 and U.S. Route 250, Augusta County and Nelson County, Virginia, United States
- Nearest city: Waynesboro, Virginia
- Coordinates: 38°01′41″N 078°52′07″W
- Area: 590 acres (240 ha)
- Built: 1913
- Architect: Baskerville & Noland
- Architectural style: Renaissance Revival, Italian Renaissance
- NRHP reference No.: 69000221
- VLR No.: 062-0022

Significant dates
- Added to NRHP: October 1, 1969
- Designated VLR: May 16, 1978

Swannanoa is an Italian Renaissance Revival villa built in 1912 by millionaire and philanthropist James H. Dooley (1841–1922) above Rockfish Gap on the border of northern Nelson County and Augusta County, Virginia, in the US. It is partially based on buildings in the Villa Medici, and the Villa Borghese located in the same park in Rome.

Rockfish Gap is the southern end of the Skyline Drive through the Shenandoah National Park and the northern terminus of the Blue Ridge Parkway.

It is located on the crest of the Blue Ridge mountains, overlooking both Shenandoah and Rockfish valleys. It is located on a jurisdictional border, so it is in both Augusta and Nelson counties.

== History ==
Intended to be a "summer place" for Richmond, Virginia millionaire and philanthropist James H. Dooley and his wife Sarah "Sallie" O. May, it reportedly took over 300 artisans speaking different languages working inside several years to build the structure, complete with marble from Tate, GA and inside Italian Marble, Georgian marble, Tiffany window, and terraced gardens. It was built as a token of love from husband to wife, the depth of James and Sallie May's relationship being represented in the 4,000 piece Tiffany stained-glass window and a domed ceiling bearing the likeness of Mrs. Dooley Despite the lavish expenditure, it was occupied only for a few years following completion in 1912.

Major Dooley died in 1922 at the age of 82. He left Swannanoa entirely to his wife, Sallie Mae, along with several million dollars. Sallie May Dooley died in 1925 at the age of 79. At her death the estate passed to Major Dooley's sisters. Many pieces of the Swannanoa furniture were moved to Maymont upon the death of Sallie May. Her Swan furniture and bed are on display at Maymont in Richmond, Virginia.

When the property was built it had state-of-the-art fixtures for the time. Electricity, plumbing and central heat were installed in the house. It was the first house to have electricity in Nelson County and to accomplish this it had its own power plant on the property. There also was a built-in elevator. Like Monticello, Thomas Jefferson's house 27 miles away, it had a dumbwaiter to bring food up from the basement kitchen to the butler's pantry on the first floor and placed on a radiator with flat shelving.

The sisters sold Swannanoa in 1926 to the Valley Corporation of Richmond, which became the second owner of Swannanoa. They planned and opened the Swannanoa Country Club and Golf Course in 1927. With the 1929 Depression, the country club had no revenue and Dooley sisters took back the property in 1932. During the Country Club era, they built a small stone building on the property for guests to pay their golf fees and it was rumored to house the region's best moonshine distillery and to be a favored supplier for government officials during Prohibition. The golf course was an 18-hole course. It was during Swannanoa's time as a country club that Calvin Coolidge had Thanksgiving dinner (1928) at the mansion. The sumptuous accommodations and isolation from the Capitol's hubbub seemed to affect Mrs. Coolidge deeply, giving her "the giddiness of a mare in the spring" according to the waitstaff. Calvin was typically silent on the subject, but seemed rather drawn and sleepy for the next day's hunting.

The United States Navy considered purchasing and renovating the property in 1942, which they calculated would cost $200,000, for the purpose of establishing a secret facility to interrogate prisoners of war. The military rejected it in favor of a Civilian Conservation Corps camp in Fort Hunt, Virginia, because it seemed unlikely that Congress would approve the purchase of such a palatial structure for the purpose.

The mansion stood empty through the Great Depression and World War II until A.T. Dulaney purchased it with a group of Charlottesville business men and formed Skyline Swannanoa, Inc. in 1944. In 1948 Swannanoa was leased for 50 years to Walter Russell for his University of Science and Philosophy. When the lease ended in 1998 James Fillmore Dulaney and his wife, Sandi Dulaney lived at Swannanoa overseeing the completed 3 million dollar external restoration of the mansion from 1999-2006.

Since 2007 Skyline Swannanoa, Inc. has operated the estate as a private venue only available by private booking or ticketed events.

== Gallery ==
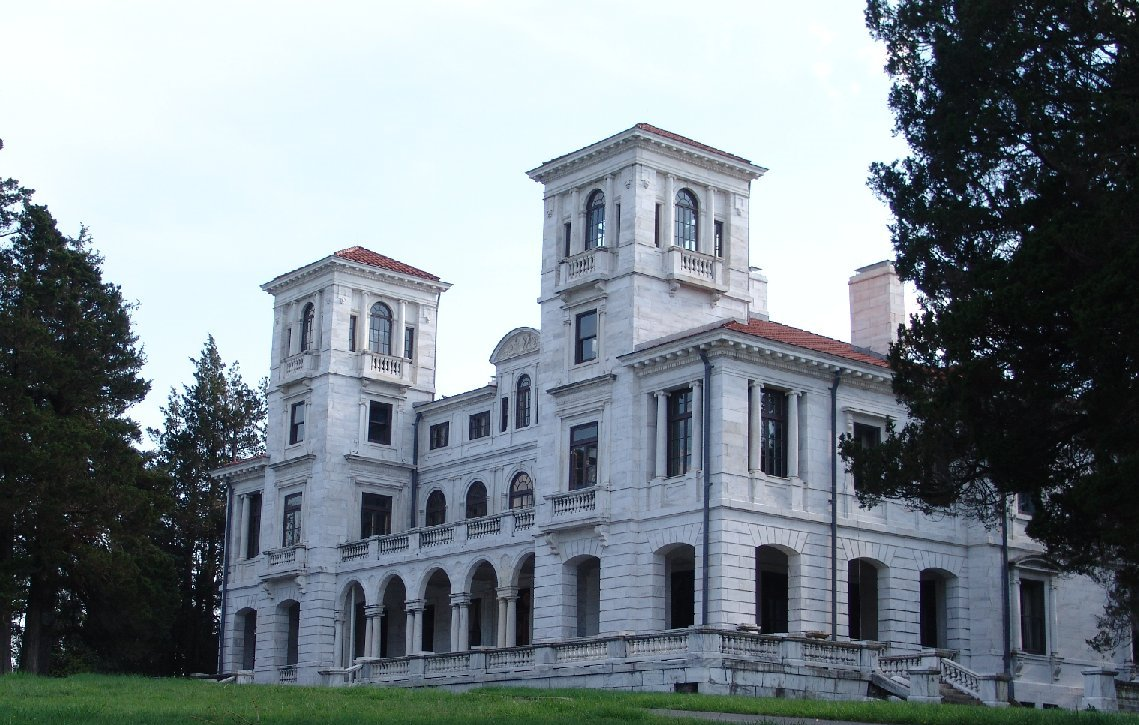
Swannanoa as it is today.

View of the front entrance of Swannanoa.

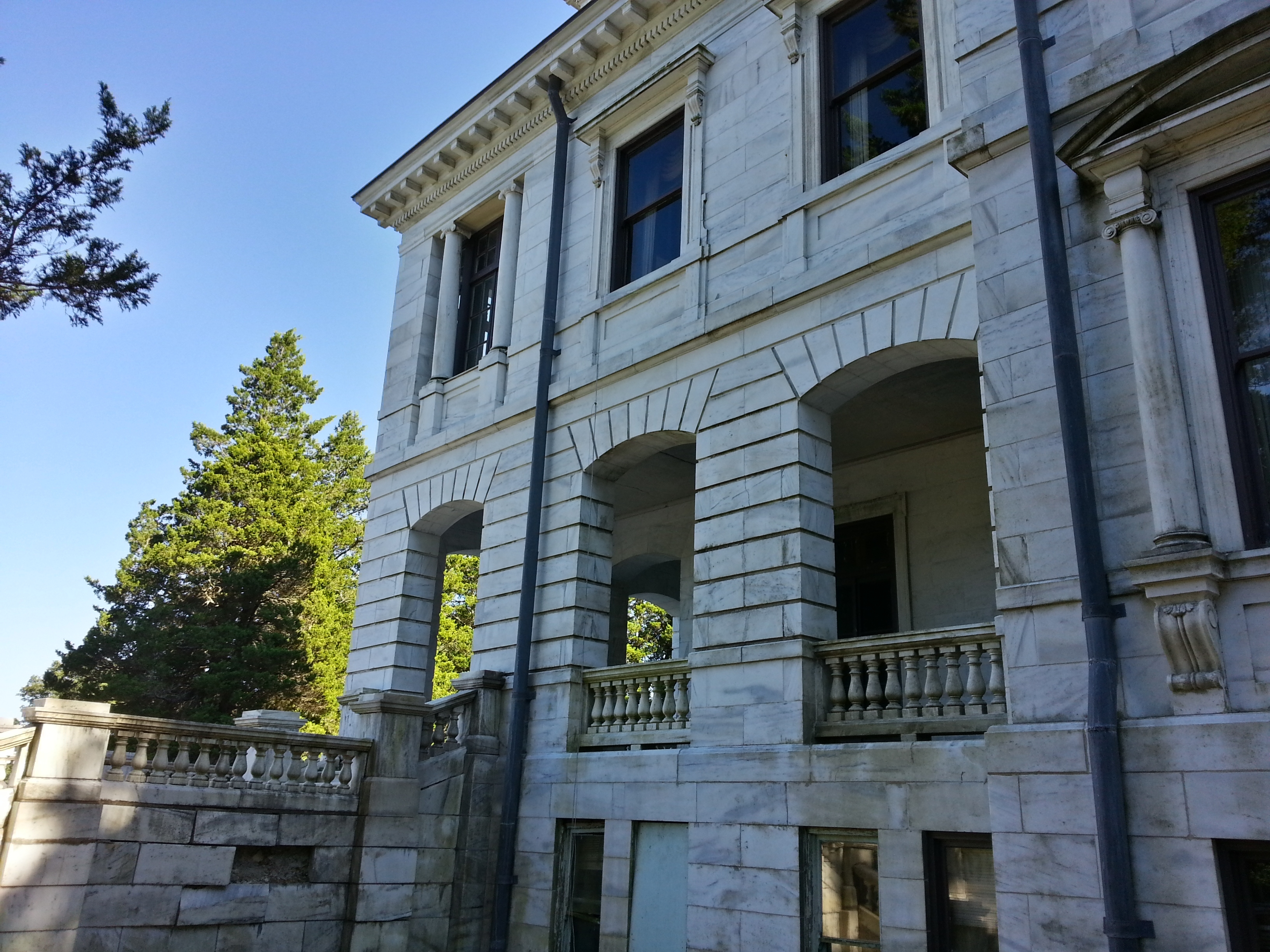
North side view.

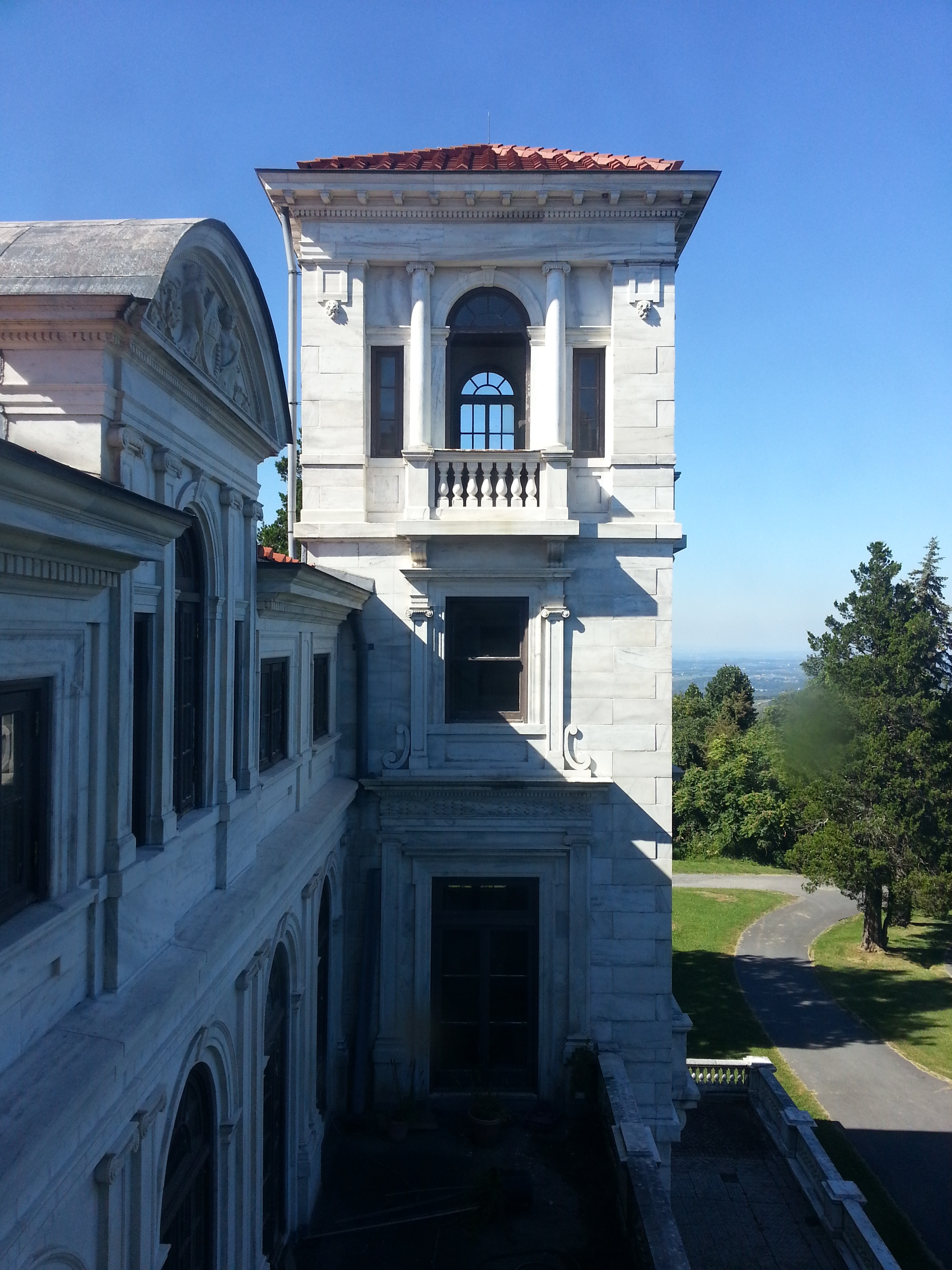
The north tower.

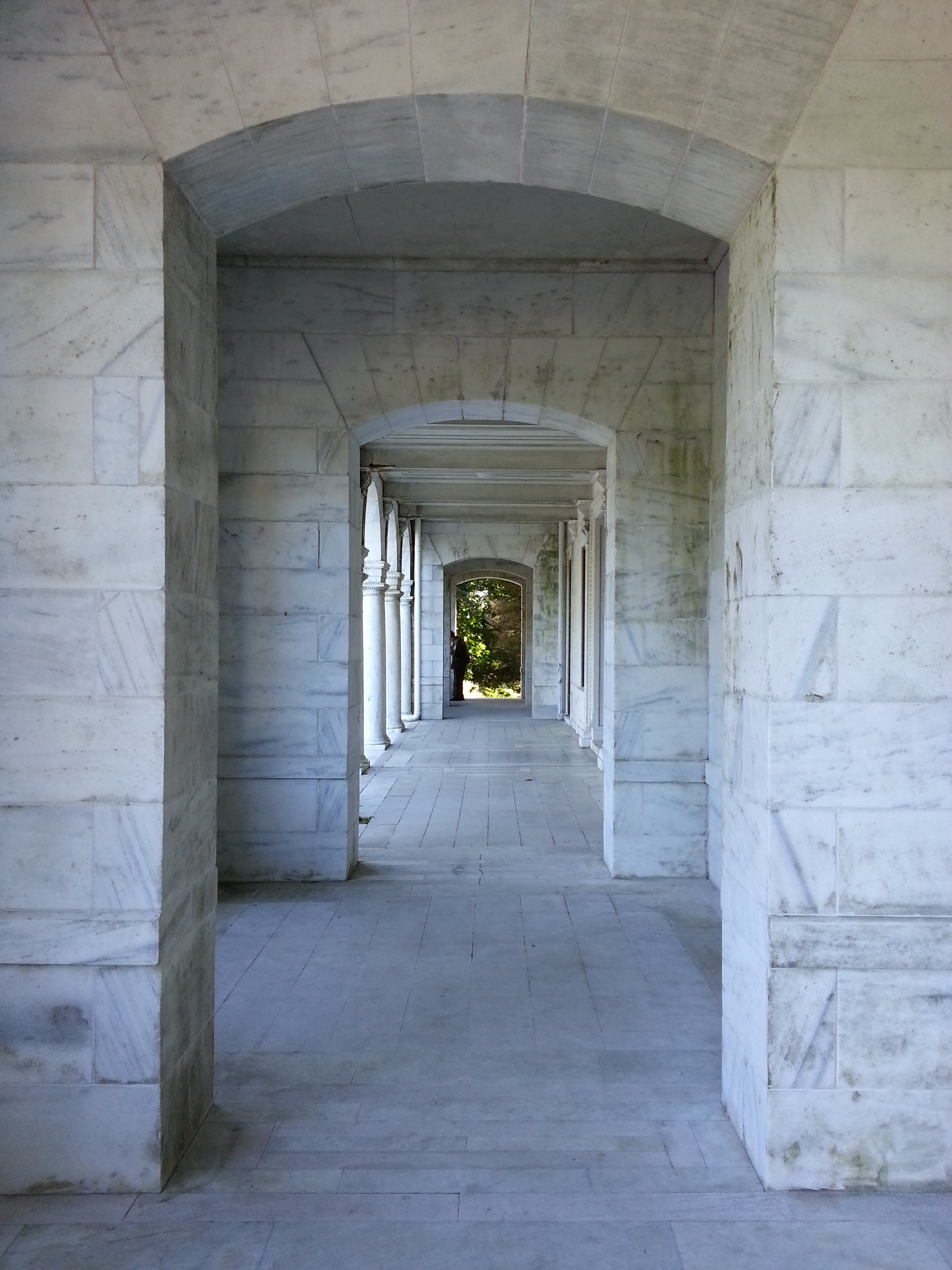
Front marble arcades.

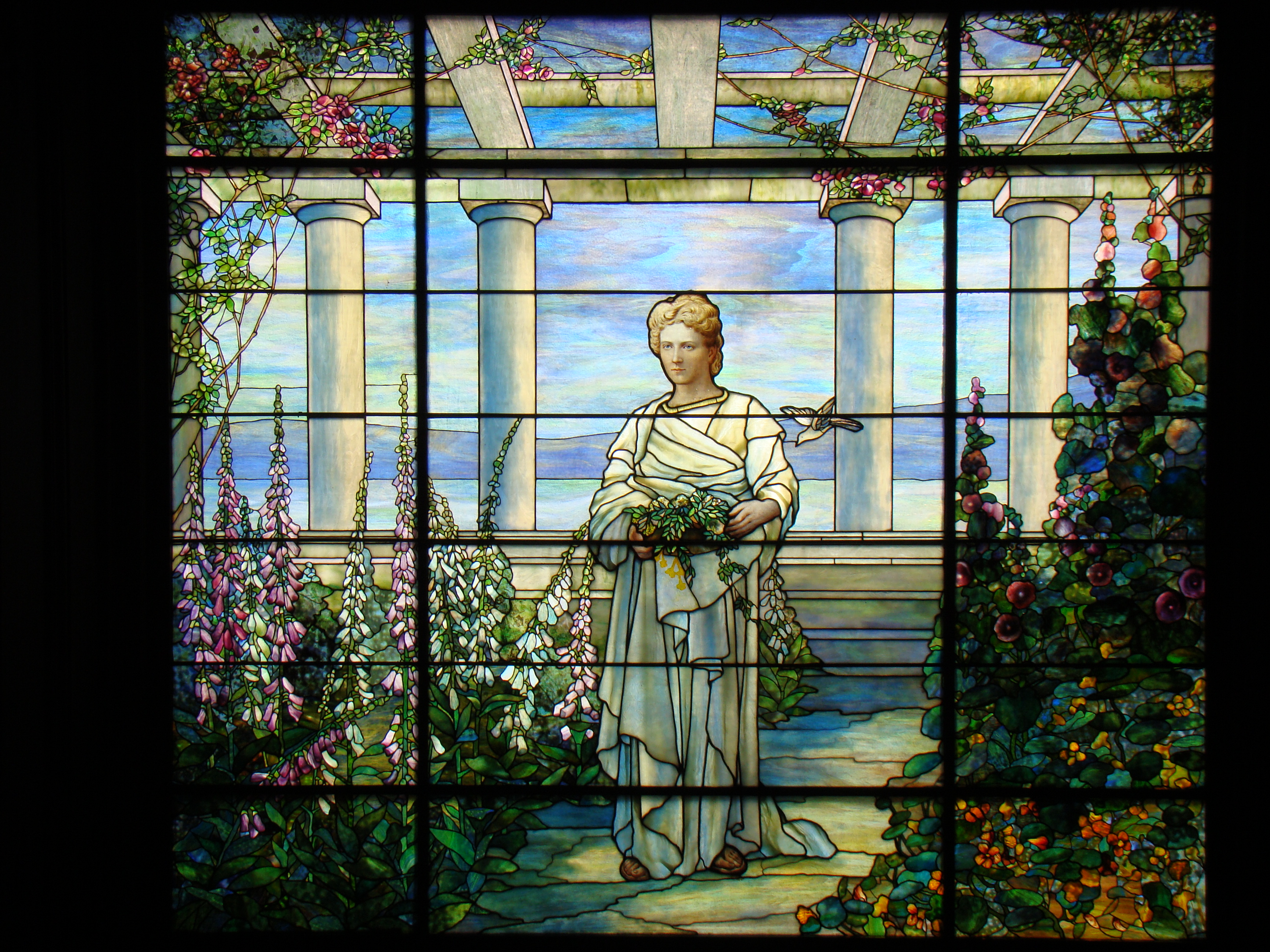
Stained glass window at landing of grand staircase.

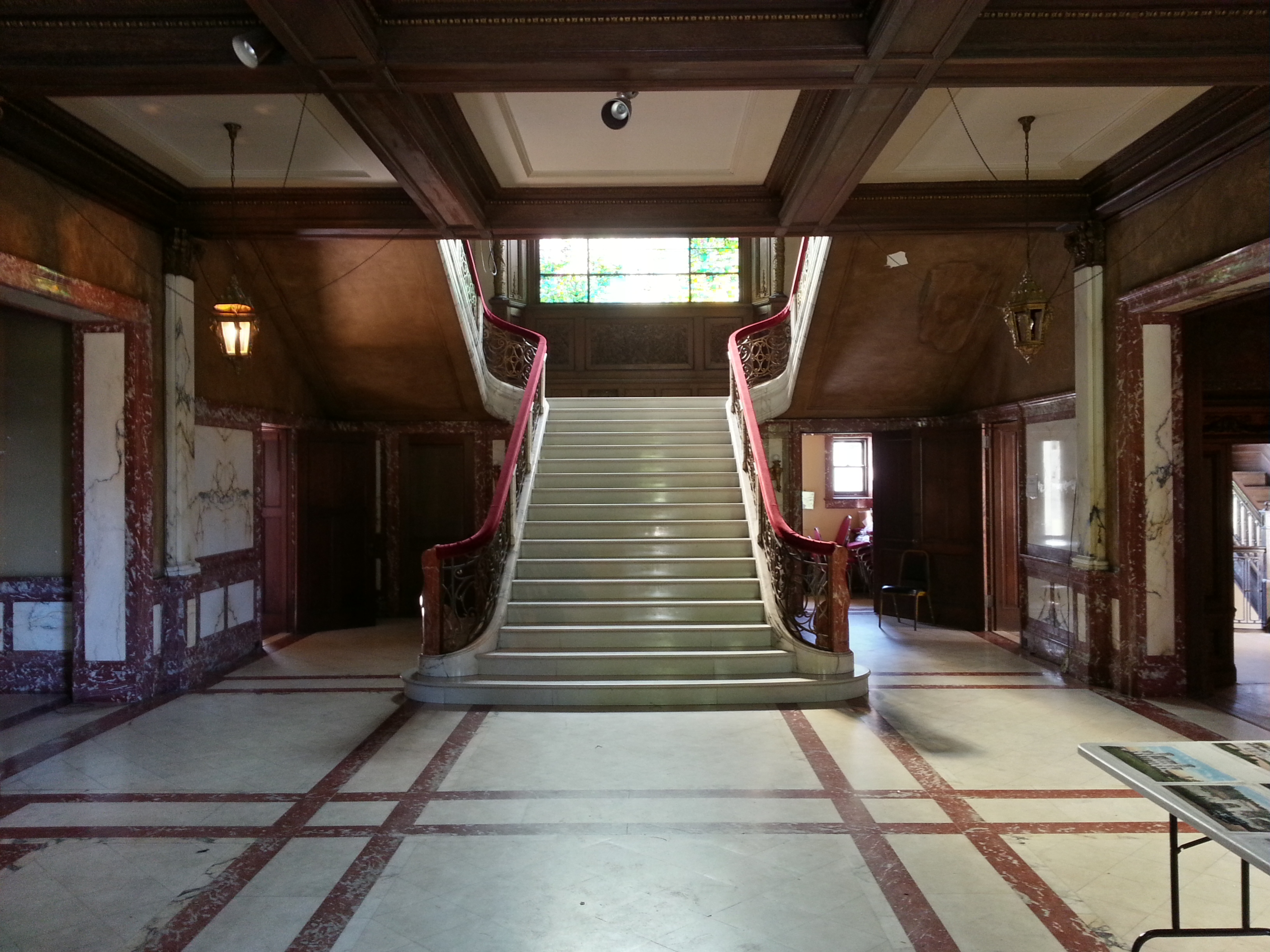
The grand staircase in the entrance hall.

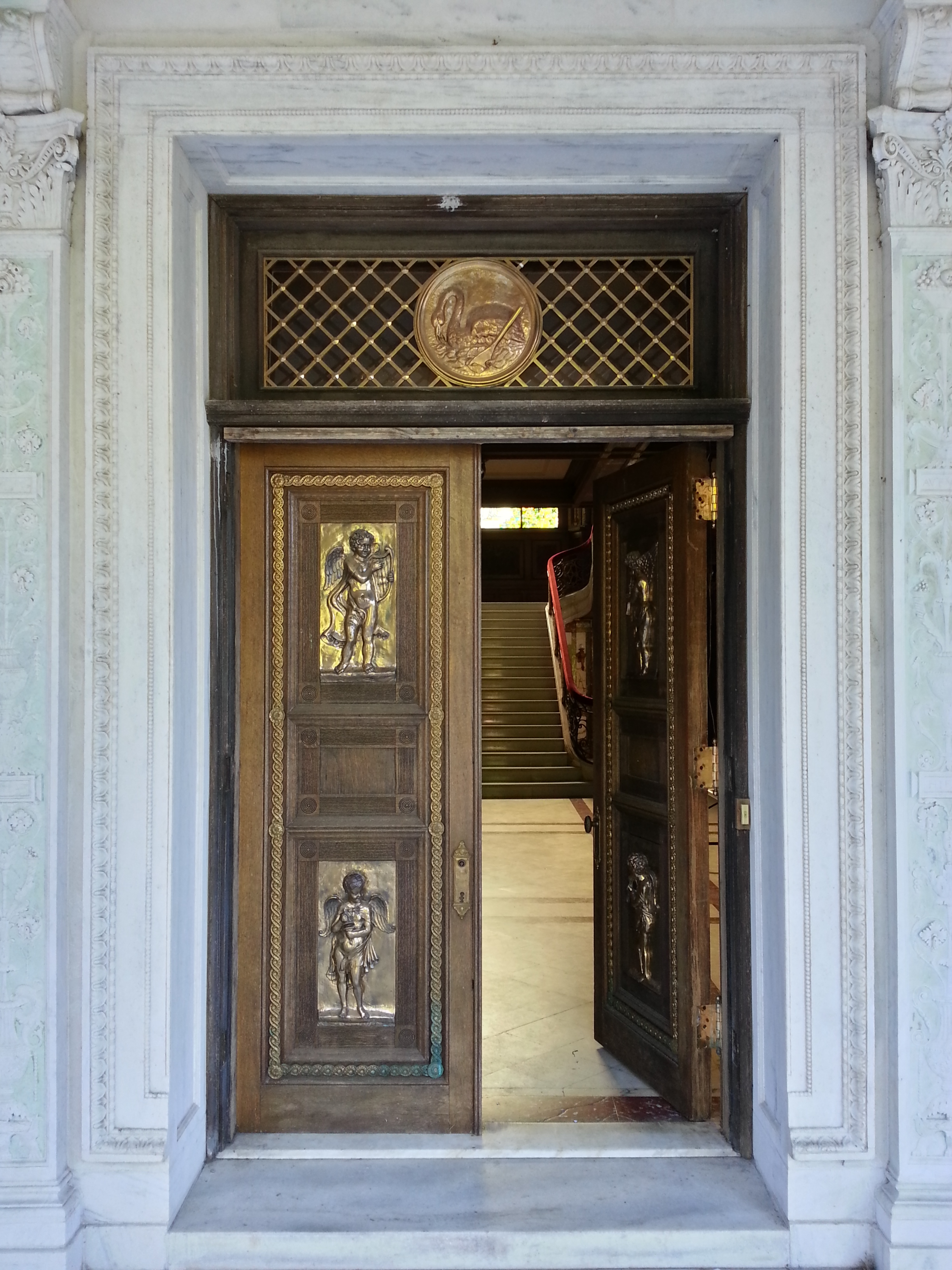
Swannanoa's front door.

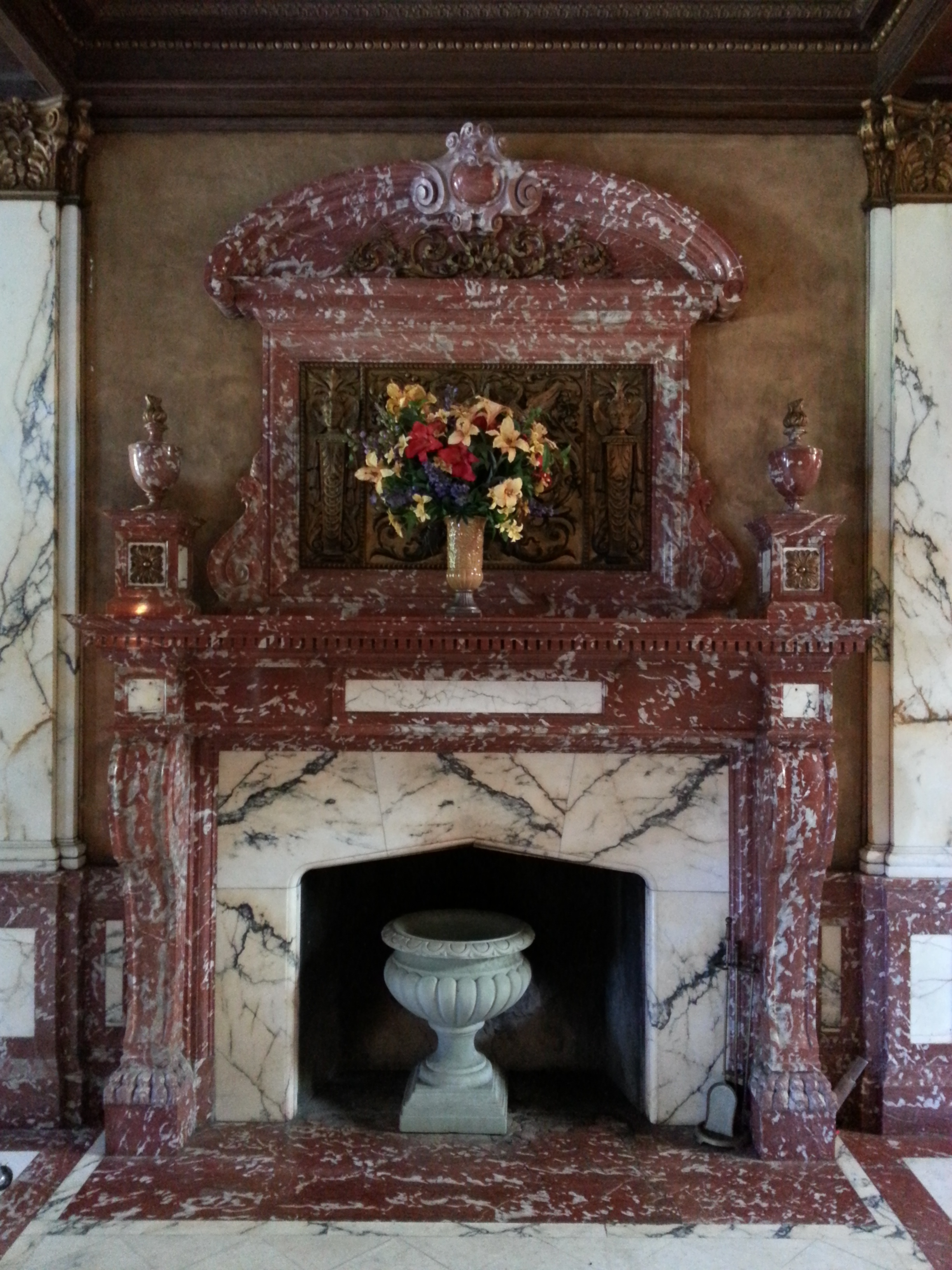
Fireplace on the entrance hall.

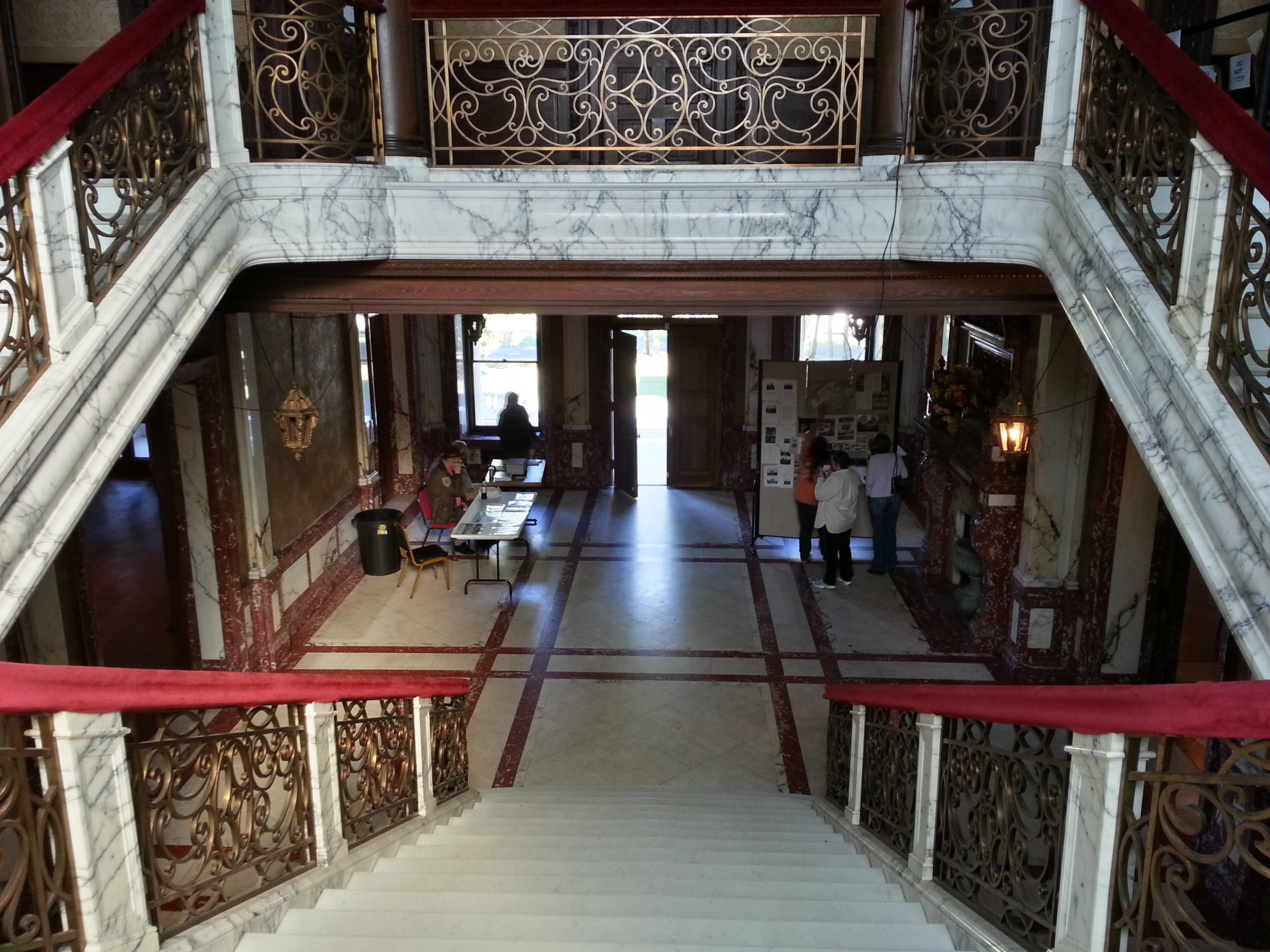
Entrance hall.

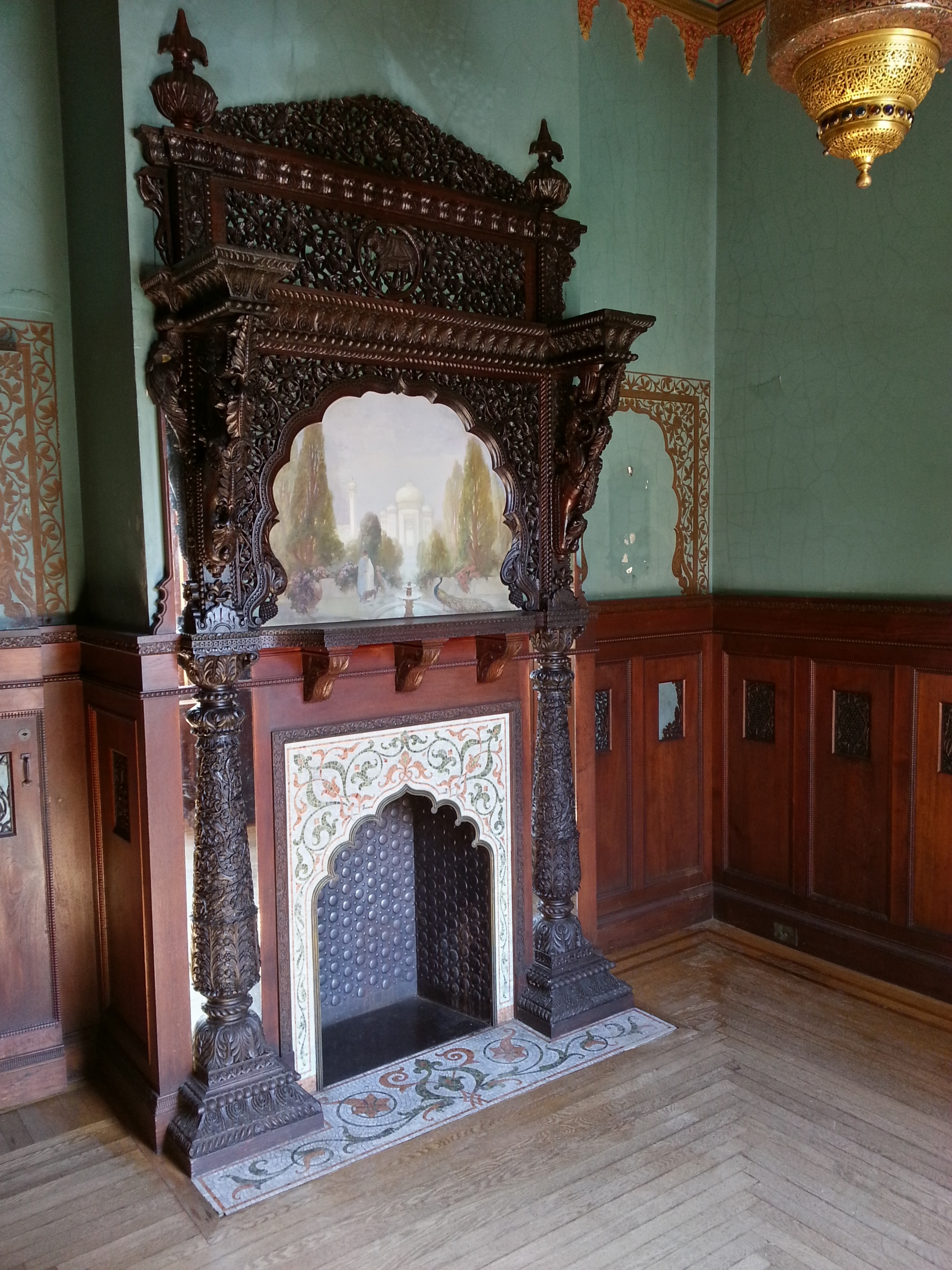
Smoking room / studio Persian-style fireplace.

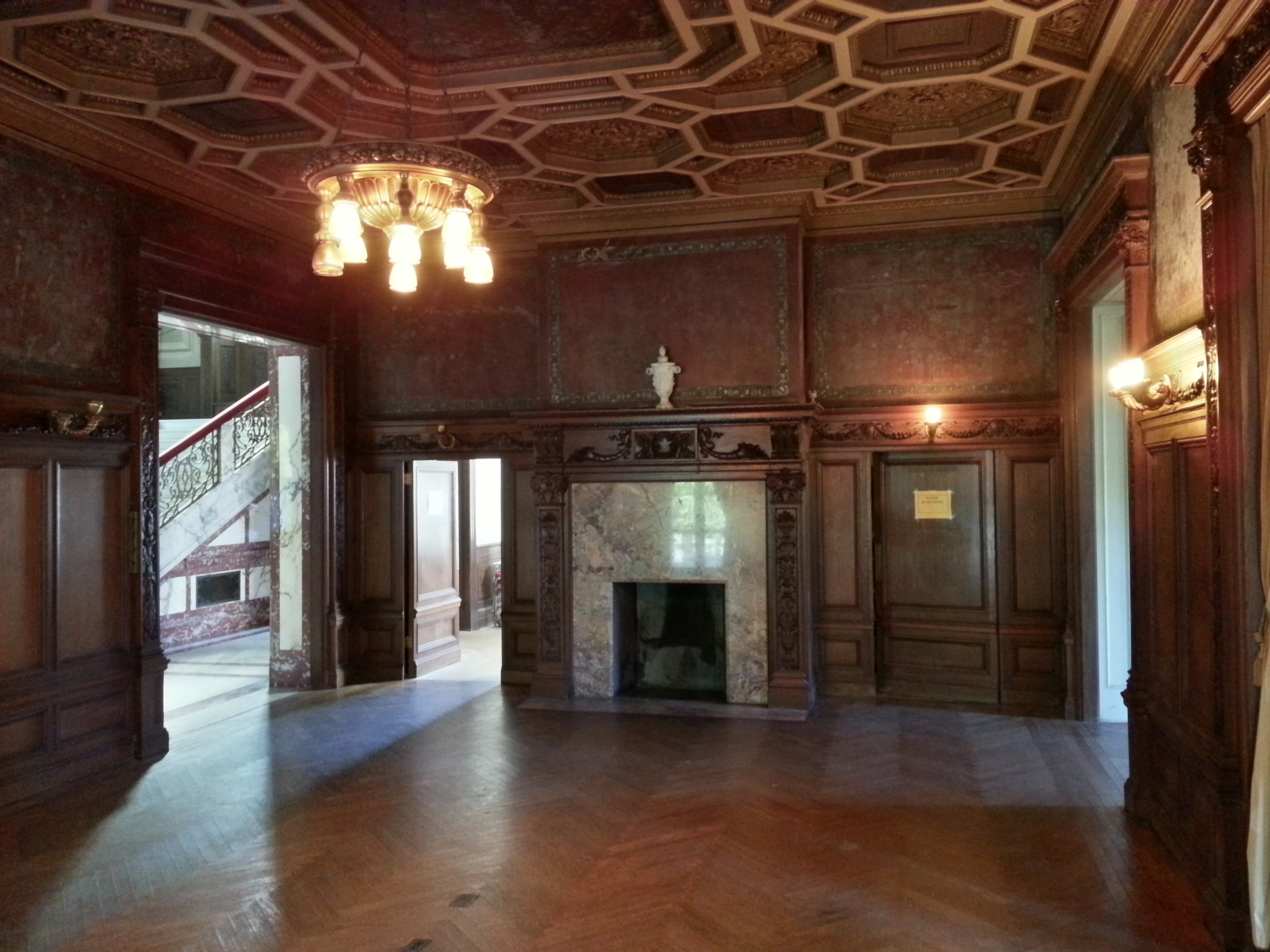
Dining room.

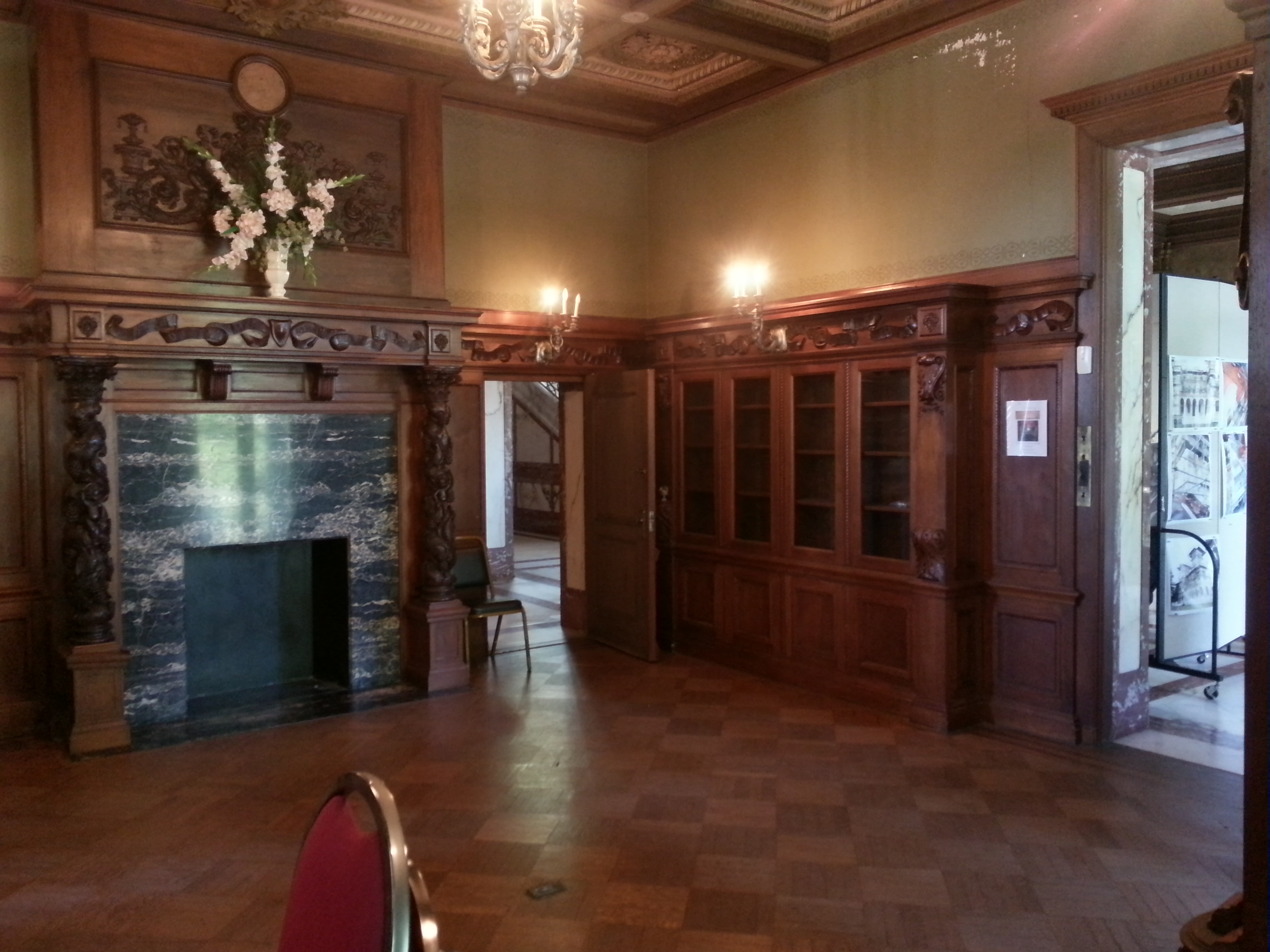
Library.

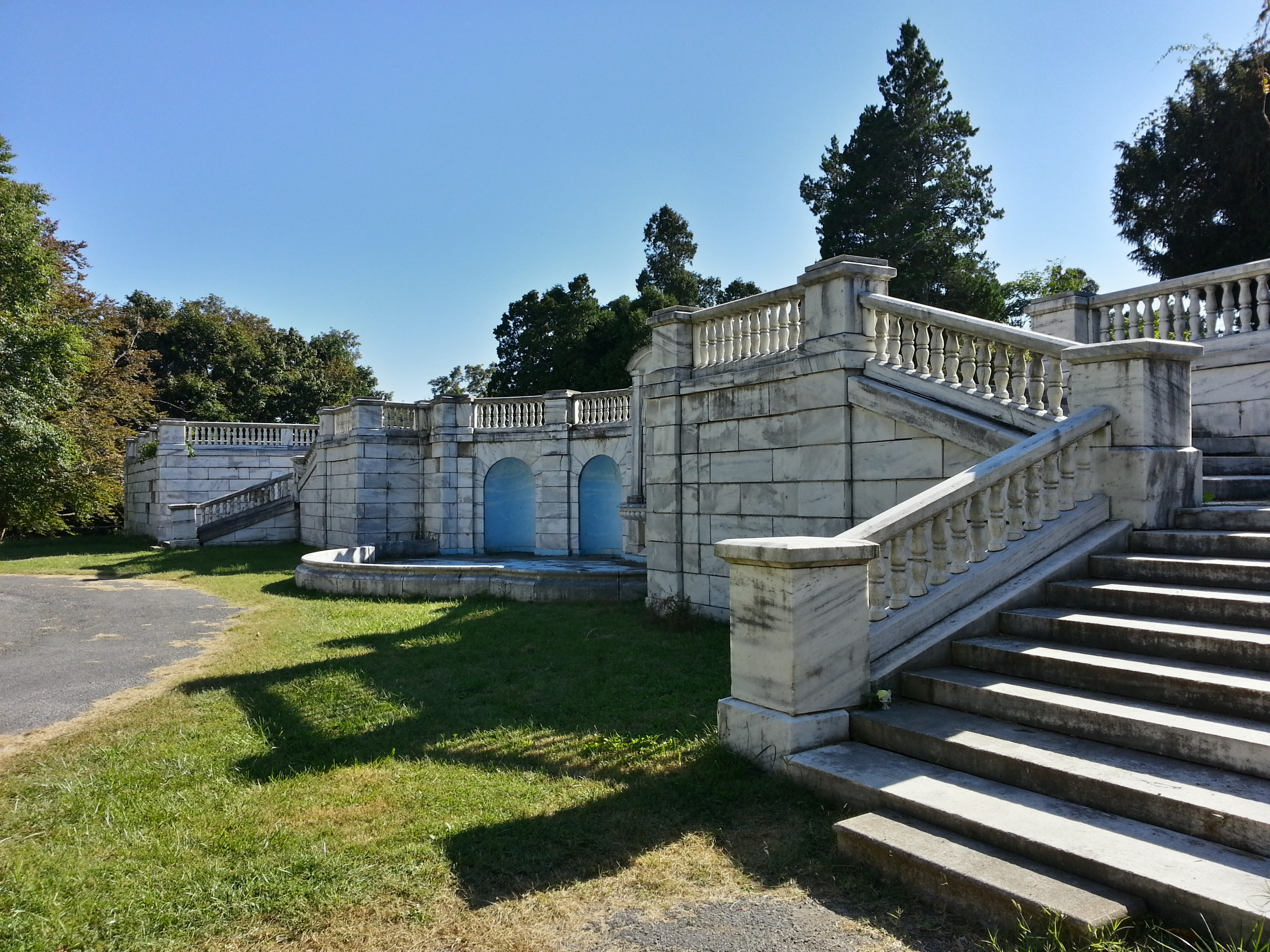
Partial view of the Italian Gardens behind the house.

== See also ==
- Hotel Colorado: Another structure inspired by the Villa Medici.
