= Joseph Hudnut =

American architect and professor

Joseph F. Hudnut
- Born: March 27, 1886; Big Rapids, Michigan
- Died: January 16, 1968 (aged 81); Norwood, Massachusetts
- Education: Harvard University, A.B. (1909); University of Michigan, B.Arch. (1912); Columbia University, M.S. (1917)

1st Dean of the Harvard Graduate School of Design
- In office 1933–1936
- Succeeded by: Josep Lluís Sert

Dean of Columbia University’s School of Architecture
- In office 1936–1953
- Preceded by: William A. Boring
- Succeeded by: Leopold Arnaud

Joseph F. Hudnut (March 27, 1886 – January 16, 1968) was an American architect scholar and professor who was the first dean of Harvard University’s Graduate School of Design. He was responsible for bringing the German modernist architects Walter Gropius and Marcel Breuer to the Harvard faculty.

== Education ==
Hudnut was born March 27, 1886, in Big Rapids, Michigan. He received an undergraduate degree from Harvard University in 1909 and a bachelor of architecture from the University of Michigan in 1912. He taught at Alabama Polytechnic Institute from 1912 to 1916, leaving to study at Columbia University, where he received a master of science in 1917. During World War I, he served with the American Expeditionary Forces in Italy.

== Career ==
Hudnut opened an architectural practice in New York in 1919 but returned to academia in 1923, teaching architecture at the University of Virginia and serving as director of the university’s McIntyre School of Fine Arts. Hudnut became a professor at Columbia University’s School of Architecture in 1926 and the school’s dean in 1933. In 1936, he became dean of the newly created Graduate School of Design (GSD) at Harvard University, which brought together architecture, landscape architecture, and planning into one school; he remained dean of the GSD until retiring in 1953.

Hudnut's own architectural designs were conservative, but as an educator he promoted modern design, and in the 1930s, he brought the German modernist architects Walter Gropius—founder of the Bauhaus—and Marcel Breuer to the Harvard faculty. Their move to the United States led to a change in American architectural education, away from historicism to an architecture that relied on craft and modern industrial techniques.

== Writings ==
Hudnut wrote several books on architecture and art, including “Modern Sculpture” (1929), “Architecture and the Spirit of Man” (1949), and “The Three Lamps of Modern Architecture” (1952), as well as many articles, and he continued to lecture on architecture after his retirement. Ralph Adams Cram wrote of Hudnut's essay "Architecture Discovers the Present" (1938) that it was "full of fine and high ideas, admirably expressed."

Hudnut served on the U.S. Commission of Fine Arts from 1950 to 1955.

== Death ==
Joseph Hudnut died of pneumonia on January 16, 1968, at a nursing home in Norwood, Massachusetts, at the age of 81.
