= 1908 USA Indoor Track and Field Championships =

National athletics championship event

- Dates: November 29-December 1
- Host city: New York City, New York, United States
- Venue: Madison Square Garden
- Level: Senior
- Type: Indoor
- Events: 22

The 1908 USA Indoor Track and Field Championships were organized by the Amateur Athletic Union (AAU) and served as the national championships in indoor track and field for the United States.

The men's championships were held at the Madison Square Garden in New York City, New York, and they took place November 29-December 1. Women's championships were not officially held until 1927.

At the championships, Harry Gissing was said to have taken advantage of Mel Sheppard's bad judgement to win the 1000 yards.

== Medal summary ==
=== Men ===
Event	Gold		Silver	Bronze
60 yards	Robert Cloughen	6.6		
75 yards	Robert Cloughen	7 4/5		
150 yards	John Eller	16 0/5		
300 yards	LeRoy Dorland	33.4		
600 yards	Mel Sheppard	1:14.8		
1000 yards	Harry Gissing	2:20.0		
2 miles	Mike Driscoll	9:28.4		
5 miles	Tom Collins	25:19 2/5		
220 yards hurdles	John Eller	28 2/5		
300 yards hurdles	John Eller	6 3/5		
High jump	Harry Porter	1.83 m		
Standing high jump	John Biller	4 ft 11 in (1.49 m)		
Standing high jump	Platt Adams	4 ft 11 in (1.49 m)		
Pole vault	Charles Vezin Jr.	3.40 m		
Pole vault for distance	Willard McLeod	26 ft 9 1/4 in (8.15 m)		
Standing long jump	Platt Adams	3.20 m		
Triple jump	Platt Adams	13.81 m		
Standing triple jump	Samuel Lawrence	32 ft 10 in (10 m)		
Shot put (8 lbs)	Martin Sheridan	61 ft 6 1/2 in (18.75 m)		
Shot put (24 lbs)	Wesley Coe	34 ft 11 1/2 in (10.65 m)		
Weight throw for height	Pat McDonald	16 ft 3 1/4 in (4.95 m)		
1 mile walk	Sam Liebgold	7:17.8		
3 miles walk	Sam Liebgold	24:10		
