= 1910 USA Indoor Track and Field Championships =

National athletics championship event

- Dates: October 31-November 1
- Host city: New York City, New York, United States
- Venue: Madison Square Garden
- Level: Senior
- Type: Indoor
- Events: 19

The 1910 USA Indoor Track and Field Championships were organized by the Amateur Athletic Union (AAU) and served as the national championships in indoor track and field for the United States.

The men's championships were held at Madison Square Garden in New York City, New York, and they took place October 31-November 1. Women's championships were not officially held until 1927.

At the championships, Harry Gissing won the 600 yards and the 1000 yards. In the 600, Gissing beat a late challenge by Melvin Sheppard by 2 yards.

== Medal summary ==
=== Men ===
Event	Gold		Silver		Bronze
60 yards	Robert Cloughen	6.8			
75 yards	Robert Cloughen	7 4/5			
150 yards	Frank Lukeman (CAN)	16	John Eller		
300 yards	LeRoy Dorland	34.2			
600 yards	Harry Gissing	1:14.0			
1000 yards	Harry Gissing	2:20.0			
2 miles	Joseph Monument	9:36.2			
70 yards hurdles	John Hartranft	9.4			
440 yards hurdles	William Robbins	57 2/5			
High jump	Harry Grumpelt	1.88 m			
Standing high jump	Platt Adams	4 ft 11 in (1.49 m)			
Pole vault	William Happeny (CAN)	3.56 m	Theodore Babcock	3.56 m	
Pole vault for distance	Platt Adams	28 ft 2 in (8.58 m)			
Standing long jump	Ray Ewry	3.31 m			
Triple jump	Dan Ahearn	14.70 m			
Standing triple jump	Daniel Healy	34 ft 0 in (10.36 m)			
Shot put (12 lbs)	Russell Lawrence	55 ft 1 1/2 in (16.8 m)			
Shot put (24 lbs)	Pat McDonald	37 ft 2 3/4 in (11.34 m)			
Weight throw for height	Cornelius Walsh (CAN)	16 ft 2 in (4.92 m)	Matthew McGrath	16 ft 0 in (4.87 m)	only 2 competitors
3 miles walk	Sam Liebgold	22:23.6			
