= 1909 USA Indoor Track and Field Championships =

National athletics championship event

- Dates: October 4-5
- Host city: New York City, New York, United States
- Venue: Madison Square Garden
- Level: Senior
- Type: Indoor
- Events: 22

The 1909 USA Indoor Track and Field Championships were organized by the Amateur Athletic Union (AAU) and served as the national championships in indoor track and field for the United States.

The men's championships were held at the Madison Square Garden in New York City, New York, and they took place October 4-5. Women's championships were not officially held until 1927.

The Irish American Athletic Club led the first day despite their "Peerless" Mel Sheppard skipping the 1000 yards to focus on the 600 yards.

== Medal summary ==
=== Men ===
Event	Gold		Silver		Bronze
60 yards	R. W. Gill	6.8			
75 yards	William Keating	7 4/5			
150 yards	John Eller	15 4/5			
300 yards	LeRoy Dorland	33.4			
600 yards	Mel Sheppard	1:14.6			
1000 yards	Harry Gissing	2:18.8			
2 miles	Mike Driscoll	9:39.0			
5 miles	Tom Collins	25:42 2/5			
220 yards hurdles	John Eller	29 0/5			
300 yards hurdles	John Hartranft	37 2/5			
High jump	Harry Porter	1.89 m			
Standing high jump	Platt Adams	5 ft 0 in (1.52 m)			
Pole vault	William Happeny (CAN)	3.50 m	Harry Babcock	11 ft 0 in (3.35 m)	
Pole vault for distance	Harry Babcock	27 ft 10 in (8.48 m)			
Standing long jump	Ray Ewry	3.35 m			
Triple jump	Dan Ahearn	14.63 m			
Standing triple jump	Ray Ewry	31 ft 8 3/4 in (9.67 m)			
Shot put (24 lbs)	Pat McDonald	36 ft 11 in (11.25 m)			
Discus throw (8 lbs)	Wesley Coe				
Weight throw for height	Matthew McGrath	15 ft 3 in (4.64 m)			
1 mile walk	Sam Liebgold	7:13.4			
3 miles walk	Sam Liebgold	23:45 4/5			
