= 1913 USA Outdoor Track and Field Championships =

American athletics championship event

- Edition: 26th
- Dates: 5 July, 1913
- Host city: Chicago, Illinois
- Venue: Grant Park
- Events: 17

The 1913 USA Outdoor Track and Field Championships were organized by the Amateur Athletic Union (AAU) and served as the national championships in outdoor track and field for the United States.

The meet took place on July 5th at Grant Park in Chicago, Illinois. The first women's championships were not held until 1923.

The Irish-American Athletic Club (44 points) lead the team scoring with a dominant showing in the weight events. The Chicago Athletic Association (27) and the Boston Athletic Association (21) finished second and third. Other scoring teams included New York Athletic Club (18), Illinois Athletic Club (13), Missouri Athletic Club (11), Springfield High School (Massachusetts) (10), University of Southern California (8), Mohawk Athletic Club (5), Kansas City Athletic Club (2), and Long Island Athletic Club (1). Two athletes who finished third were not associated with any team and were listed as unattached.

Meet records were set in the pole vault by Stanley Wagoner, triple jump by Daniel Ahearn, and hammer throw by Patrick James Ryan. Other impressive performances included Howard Drew winning the 100 and 220 yards as a high schooler, higher schooler Charley Corri defeating star USC hurdler Fred Kelly in the 220 yard hurdles, and Platt Adams scoring in both the long jump and javelin.

== Results ==
Event	Gold			Silver			Bronze		
100 yards	Howard Drew	10.4	Springfield High School	Oliver Reiler	2 yds behind	MAC	Alvah Meyer	1 ft behind 2nd	IAAC
220 yards	Howard Drew	22.8	Springfield High School	Carl Cooke		CAA	James Rosenberger		IAAC
440 yards	Caroll Haff	51.2	CAA	Thomas Halpin		BAA	Frederick Cortis		CAA
880 yards	Homer Baker	2:00.2	NYAC	Oliver W. DeGruchy			Melvin Sheppard		IAAC
1 mile	Norman Taber	4.26.4	BAA	James Powers	10 yds behind	BAA	Abel Kiviat		IAAC
5 miles	(Finland) Hannes Kolehmainen	26:10.6	IAAC	Joie Ray	3/4 lap behind	IAC	Gaston Strobino		Unattached
3 mile walk	Edward Renz	23:19.2	Mowhawk AC	T. Nurendorfer		NYAC	Frank Plant		LIAC
120 yards hurdles	Fred Kelly	16.4	USC	John Nicholson	1 ft behind	MAC	E.S. Riedel		CAA
220 yards hurdles	Charley Corri	25.6	CAA	Fred Kelly		USC	J. A. High		BAA
High jump	Alma Richards	1.87	KCAC	Harry Barwise	1.84	BAA	Egon Erickson	1.84	Unattached
Pole vault	Stanley Wagoner	3.96 MR	MAC	Frank Murphy	3.71	CAA	John Gold	3.60	CAA
Long jump	Philip Stiles	6.72	CAA	J. Whinery	6.65	NYAC	Platt Adams	6.61	NYAC
Triple jump	Daniel Ahearn	15.24 MR	IAC	Timothy Ahearne	14.81	IAAC	M.J. Fahey	14.15	IAAC
Shot put	Lawrence Whitney	14.09	BAA	Pat McDonald	14.01	IAAC	Lee Talbott	13.61	KCAC
Discus throw	Emil Muller	40.42	IAAC	Arlie Mucks	40.37	CAA	Lawrence Whitney	38.57	BAA
Hammer throw	Patrick James Ryan	54.14 MR	IAAC	Matthew McGrath	52.18	IAAC	Lee Talbott	40.57	KCAC
56 lb Weight throw	Matthew McGrath	11.72	IAAC	Pat McDonald		IAAC	Patrick James Ryan		IAAC
Javelin throw	Bruno Brodd	49.15	IAAC	Platt Adams	46.89	NYAC	Thomas Lund	44.88	IAAC

== See also ==
- 1913 USA Indoor Track and Field Championships
- List of USA Outdoor Track and Field Championships winners (men)
- List of USA Outdoor Track and Field Championships winners (women)
