= Harry Schaaf =

American track and field athlete

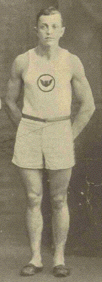
Harry Schaaf, wearing the Winged Fist of the Irish American Athletic Club, 1911.

Henry "Harry" Schaaf (born 29 November 1886) was an American track and field athlete, a member of the Irish American Athletic Club, and a Police Officer in the New York City Police Department. He served as a patrolman from 1912 until his retirement in 1943.

On April 9, 1911, Schaaf was a member of the Irish American Athletic Club 4×440 yard relay team that broke the world record at Celtic Park, Queens, New York and set the first IAAF- recognized world's record for 4×440 yard or 4×400 meter relay race, with a time of 3 minutes and 18.2 seconds. The other members of the world's record-setting team were Harry Gissing, Mel Sheppard and James Rosenberger.
