= Stagg Field =

Football field at the University of Chicago, Illinois, US

Coordinates: 41°47′38″N 87°36′14″W

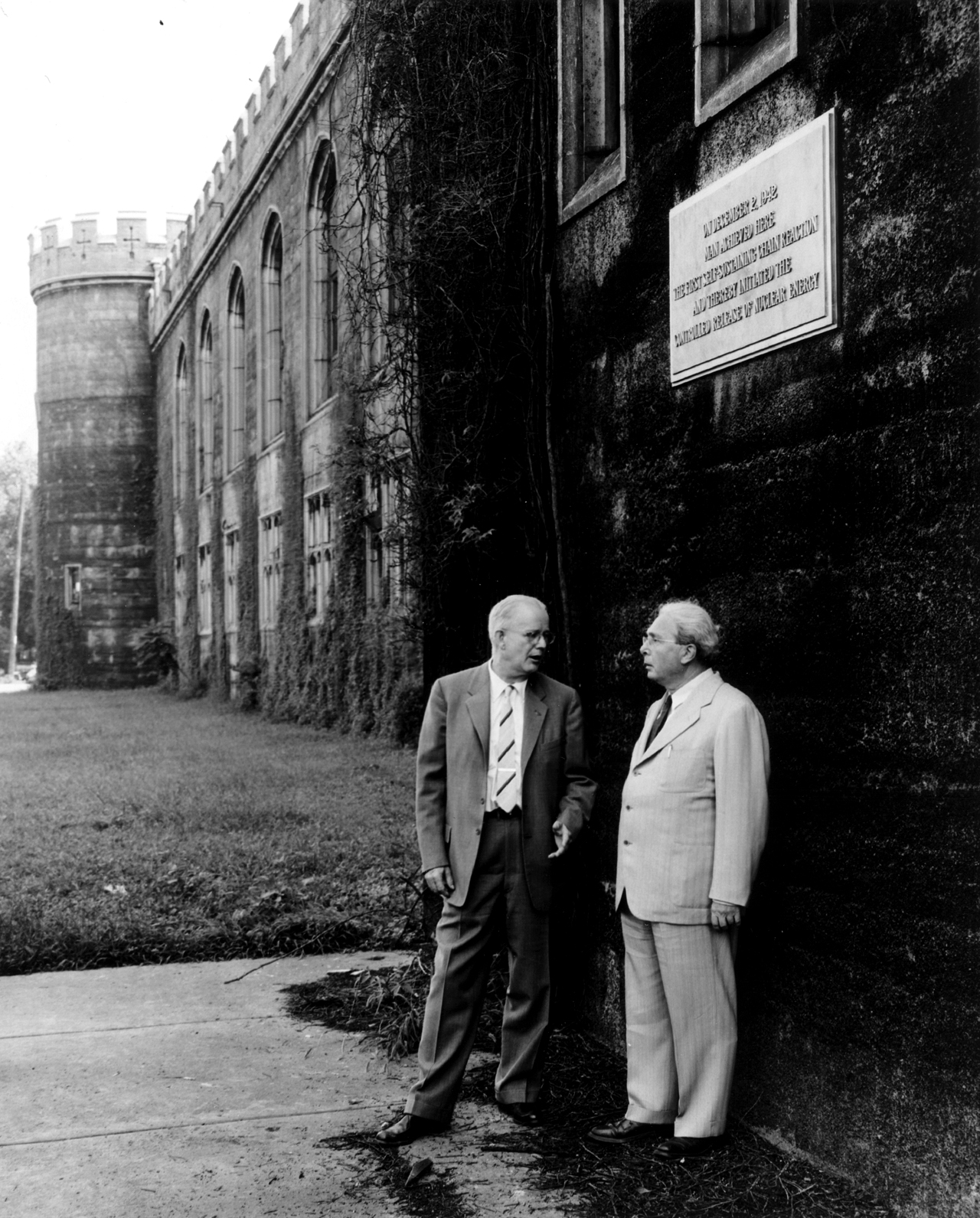
Met Lab scientists Leó Szilárd (right) and Norman Hilberry under a plaque commemorating CP-1 on the West Stands of Old Stagg Field. The experiment occurred inside the stands building at this location. The stands were demolished in 1957 and Stagg Field moved. A memorial quadrangle now marks this location

Amos Alonzo Stagg Field is the name of two successive football fields for the University of Chicago. Beyond sports, the first Stagg Field (1893–1957), named for famed coach Alonzo Stagg, is remembered for its role in a landmark scientific achievement of Enrico Fermi and the Metallurgical Laboratory during the Manhattan Project. The site of the first artificial nuclear chain reaction, which occurred within the field's west viewing-stands structure, received designation as a National Historic Landmark on February 18, 1965. On October 15, 1966, which is the day that the National Historic Preservation Act of 1966 was enacted creating the National Register of Historic Places, it was added to that as well. The site was named a Chicago Landmark on October 27, 1971.

A Henry Moore sculpture, Nuclear Energy, in a small quadrangle commemorates the location of the nuclear experiment. The University's current Stagg Field a football, soccer, and track field is located a few blocks away and reuses one of the original gates.

== First nuclear chain reaction ==
Chicago Pile-1, the world's first artificial nuclear reactor, was built in a squash court under the west stands of Stagg Field, which was by then no longer used for football. The first man-made self-sustaining nuclear chain reaction occurred on December 2, 1942.

== Sports venue ==
=== First Stagg Field ===
The first Stagg Field was a stadium at the University of Chicago in Chicago. It was located on a block bounded by 57th Street to the south, University Avenue to the east, and Ellis Avenue to the west. The stadium was primarily used for college football games, and was the home field of the Maroons. Stagg Field originally opened in 1893 as Marshall Field, named after Marshall Field who donated land to the university to build the stadium. In 1913, the field was renamed Stagg Field after their famous coach Amos Alonzo Stagg. The final capacity, after several stadium expansions, was 50,000. The University of Chicago discontinued its football program after 1939 and left the Big Ten Conference in 1946. The stadium was demolished in 1957, and much of the stadium site was used as the site of Regenstein Library.

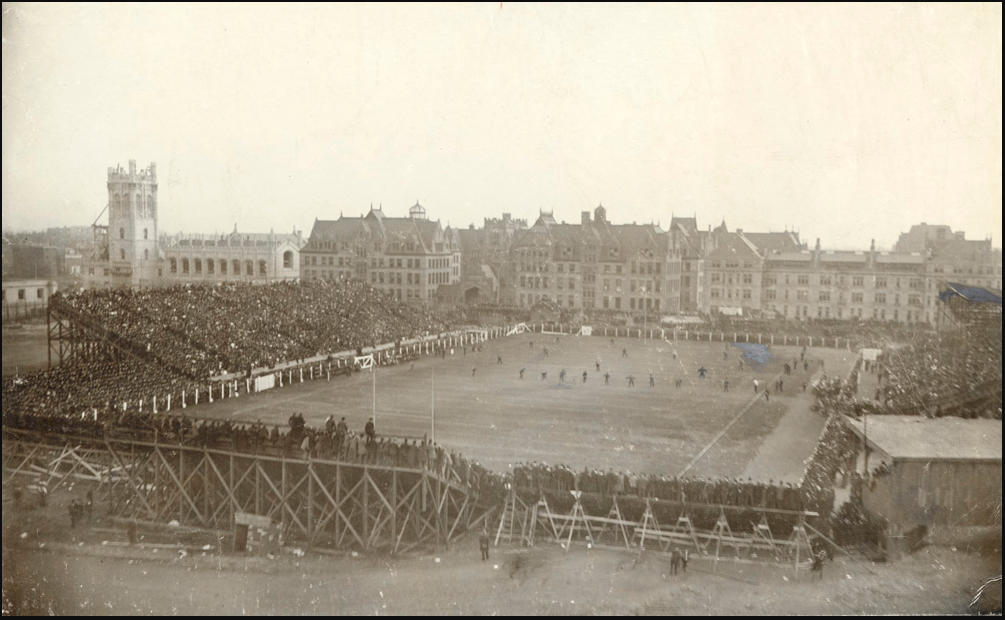
Stagg Field (then called Marshall Field) c.1900 before the construction of the permanent stadium seating. Note: Bartlett Gymnasium has not been erected at the time of this photo.

In addition to Maroons football, the stadium hosted other events, including the 1893, 1898, 1913, 1923, and 1933 USA Outdoor Track and Field Championships; a regional qualifying meet for the US Olympic Trials for Track and Field held June 19–20, 1936; and the NCAA Men's Track and Field Championships in 1921, 1922, 1923, 1929, 1930, 1931, 1932, 1933, and 1936.

Northwestern also played a number of home games at Stagg Field. At the turn of the 20th century, Northwestern was unable to handle large crowds, so they hosted then-powerhouse Minnesota at Marshall Field for a 1901 game and a 1904 game. In 1925 (a year prior to the opening of Dyche Stadium, later known as Ryan Field) Northwestern again was unable to accommodate large crowds, and as a result played two games at Stagg Field. The first was a notable win over Michigan. The second was an October 24 game against Tulane that had originally been scheduled to be played at Soldier Field instead. Tulane won the game at Stagg Field 18–7.

The University of Michigan fight song "The Victors" was written by Michigan music student Louis Elbel in 1898, following a last minute 12–11 Michigan victory over the University of Chicago at Stagg Field for the Western Conference championship.

=== New Stagg Field ===
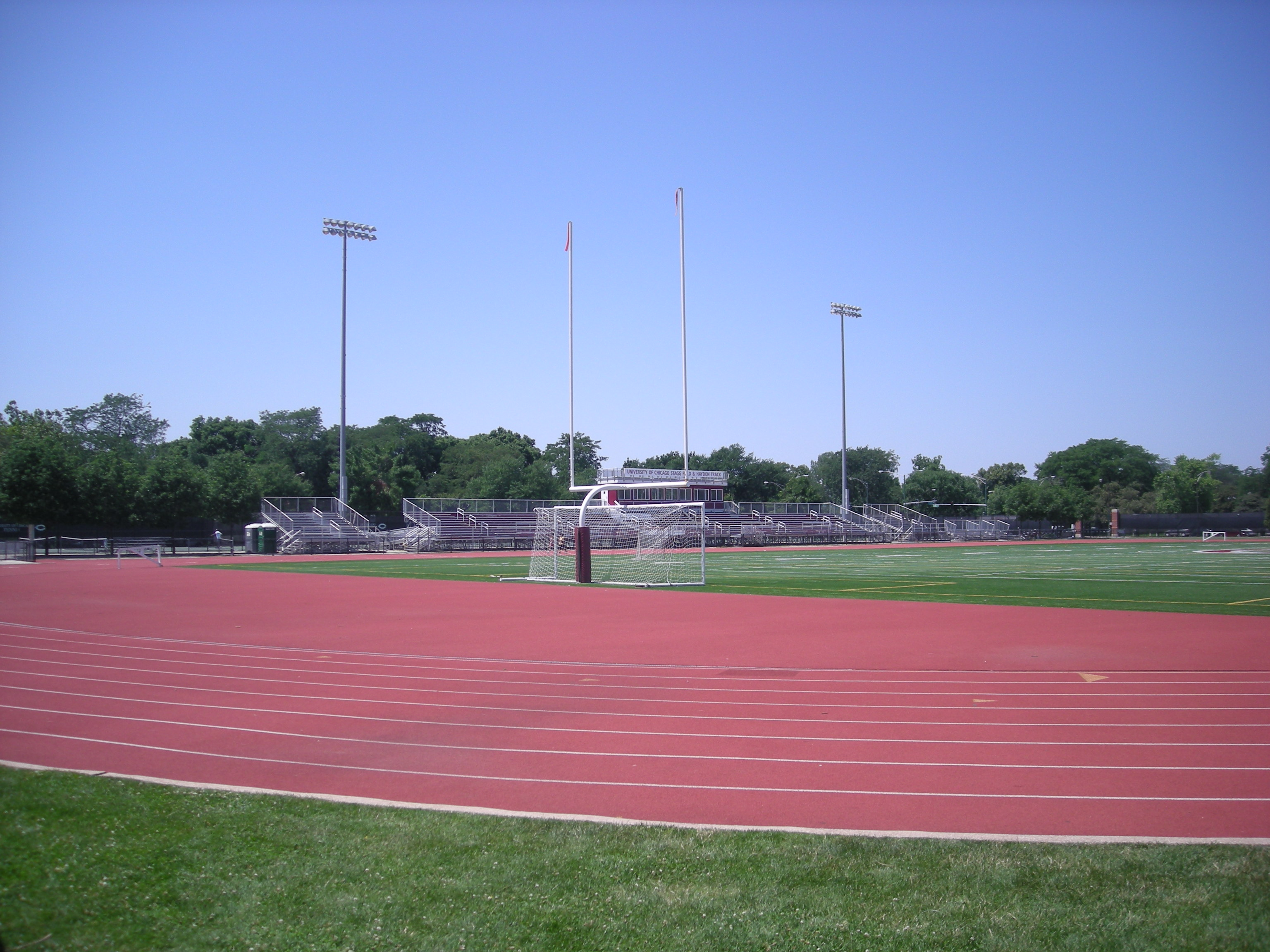
Stagg Field in 2013

The current Stagg Field is an athletic field located several blocks to the northwest that preserves the Stagg Field name, as well as a relocated gate from the original facility. The football field and the rest of the athletic complex are on a block bounded by 55th Street to the north, 56th Street to the south, Cottage Grove Avenue to the west, and Ellis Avenue well to the east. The school's current Division III football team uses the new field as their home. It is also home to the Chicago Maroons soccer, softball and outdoor track teams. Stagg Field has a seating capacity of 1,650, and the playing surface is made of FieldTurf.

== See also ==
- Enrico Fermi
