= Bromilow =

Bromilow is a surname. Notable people with the surname include:

- Belinda Bromilow (born 1975), Australian actress
- George Bromilow (1931–2005), English footballer
- Joseph Bromilow (1881–1972), American athlete
- Peter Bromilow (1933–1994), British-born actor
- Tom Bromilow (1894–1959), English footballer
