= J. H. Duncan =

J. H. Duncan may refer to:

- James H. Duncan (1793–1869), American politician
- James Duncan (athlete) (1887–1955), American athlete
- John H. Duncan (1855–1929), American architect
