= Michael Driscoll =

Michael Driscoll or Mike Driscoll may refer to:

- Michael Patrick Driscoll (1939–2017), Roman Catholic bishop of Boise
- Michael Driscoll (economist) (born 1950), English economist and university administrator
- Michael E. Driscoll (1851–1929), U.S. Representative from New York
- Michael Driscoll (baseball) (1892–1953), American baseball pitcher
- Michael Driscoll (Pennsylvania politician) (born 1960), member of the Pennsylvania House of Representatives
- Mike Driscoll (runner), winner of the 2 miles at the 1909 USA Indoor Track and Field Championships
