= Michael J. Ryan (runner) =

American long-distance runner

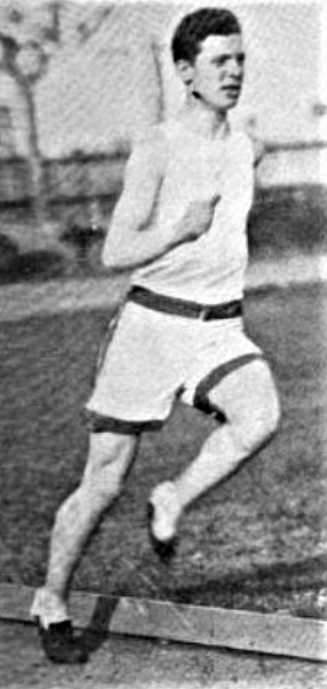
- Born: January 1, 1889; New York, New York
- Died: December 27, 1971 (aged 82); San Jose, California
- Occupation: Athlete

Michael J. Ryan (January 1, 1889 – December 27, 1971) was an American track and field athlete and a member of the Irish American Athletic Club. He was a distance runner and competed in the marathon for the U.S. Olympic team in the 1908 Summer Olympics and 1912 Summer Olympics, but did not finish either race.

== Biography ==
Michael J. Ryan was born in New York City on January 1, 1889.

In later life he owned a sporting goods store in San Jose, California. He died in a hospital there on December 27, 1971.

== Career ==
=== Olympics ===
Ryan competed in the marathon for the U.S. Olympic team in the 1908 Summer Olympics, but did not finish.

He also competed in the marathon at the 1912 Summer Olympics, but did not finish.

He was a coach for U.S. Olympics teams in 1920, 1924, and 1928.

=== Boston Marathon ===
Ryan competed in the Boston Marathon in 1907, finishing 15th, in 1908 he came in fourth place with a time of 2:27:08. He did not finish the race in 1909. He came in fifth place in 1910 with a time of 2:38:24, and ninth place in 1911 with a time of 2:36:15. On April 19, 1912, "over an unusually sticky course, Mike Ryan, wearing the colors of the Irish American Athletic Club of New York City won the Boston Athletic Association's sixteenth Marathon race with a time of 2:21:18," cutting the former record by 21.04 seconds.

In 1909, he finished third place in the Yonkers Marathon, with a time of 2:49:40.

=== Canadian Marathon ===
In 1910, Ryan won the 2nd annual Canadian Marathon, held in Hamilton, Ontario, "defeating a field of over thirty of the best Canadian distance runners" with a time of 2:49:19. "The roads in parts of the course were muddy and rough and Ryan's performance was a remarkable one." He finished seven minutes ahead of the second-place finisher, Charles Cook.

=== Marathon in London ===
On May 27, 1911, against an array of international athletes, Ryan came in second place in a marathon sponsored by the Polytechnic Harriers in London, England with a time of 2 hours 50 minutes and 45 seconds. The course for this race as nearly identical to the 1908 Olympic marathon.
