= Robert Cloughen =

American athlete

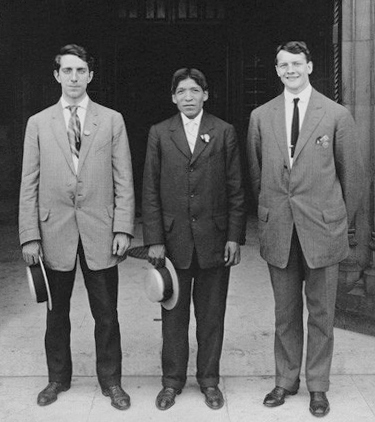
- James Sullivan, Lewis Tewanima and Robert Cloughen in 1908

Personal information
- Born: January 26, 1889 The Bronx, New York, United States
- Died: August 7, 1930 (aged 41) New York City, United States
- Height: 1.79 m (5 ft 10 in)
- Weight: 76 kg (168 lb)

Sport
- Sport: Athletics
- Events: 100 m, 200 m
- Club: I-AAC, Queens

Achievements and titles
- Personal bests: 100 m – 10.8 (1910); 200 m – 22.1 (1910)
Medal record
Representing the United States
Olympic Games
Silver medal – second place	1908 London	200 m

Robert Cloughen (January 26, 1889 – August 7, 1930) was an American athlete, a member of the Irish American Athletic Club, and a member of the 1908 U.S. Olympic team. His father, John, was the fifth Manhattan Borough president in 1909 and also New York City's Commissioner of Public Works.

Cloughen attended Morris High School in the Bronx, where he was a member of the football, baseball and basketball teams as well as Treasurer of the Athletic Association. While at Morris, he was also an early member of the Delta Chapter of the Omega Gamma Delta Fraternity, of which his father became an Honorary Member and Adult Advisor. After high school, he attended Fordham University, New York University, and the Savage School of Physical Education.

Cloughen was initially turned down for the 1908 U. S. Olympic team, worked his way to Europe on a tramp steamer, and was accepted as an additional team member on the spot. Cloughen won the silver medal in the 200 m at the 1908 Summer Olympics in London. His preliminary heat time was 23.4 seconds; he dropped to 22.6 seconds to win his semifinal. In the final, Cloughen came from behind to nearly catch Robert Kerr on the straightaway; he lost by about nine inches as both finished in 22.6 seconds. Cloughen also competed in the 100 m in 1908, winning his first round heat with a time of 11.0 seconds before not starting in the semifinal round.

Also in 1908, Cloughen won the National A.A.U junior championship 100 yard sprint, with a time of 10.2 seconds. At the indoor A.A.U championships the same year, Cloughen won the 60 yard and 75 yard races, equaling the existing records and establishing himself as "one of the best sprinters in the United States."

In 1909, Cloughen ran 130 yards in 12.8 seconds, establishing a new world record.

In 1910, Cloughen broke the world's record for the 110 yard dash at the Tailtin Games held at Celtic Park, Queens, New York, with a time of 10.8 seconds. "Cloughen jumped into the lead at the start of the 110-yard dash and led all the way, winning by two yards from John Eller in the remarkably fast time of 0:10 4–5. Billy Keating, another of Lawson Robertson's team (the Irish American Athletic Club), finished a close third."

In 1922, Cloughen was named track coach at the University of Vermont. From Vermont he returned to New York as track coach at Erasmus Hall High School in Brooklyn from 1926 to 1930. Robert Cloughen died in August 1930 while training for an Olympic comeback.
