= James Rosenberger =

American sprinter

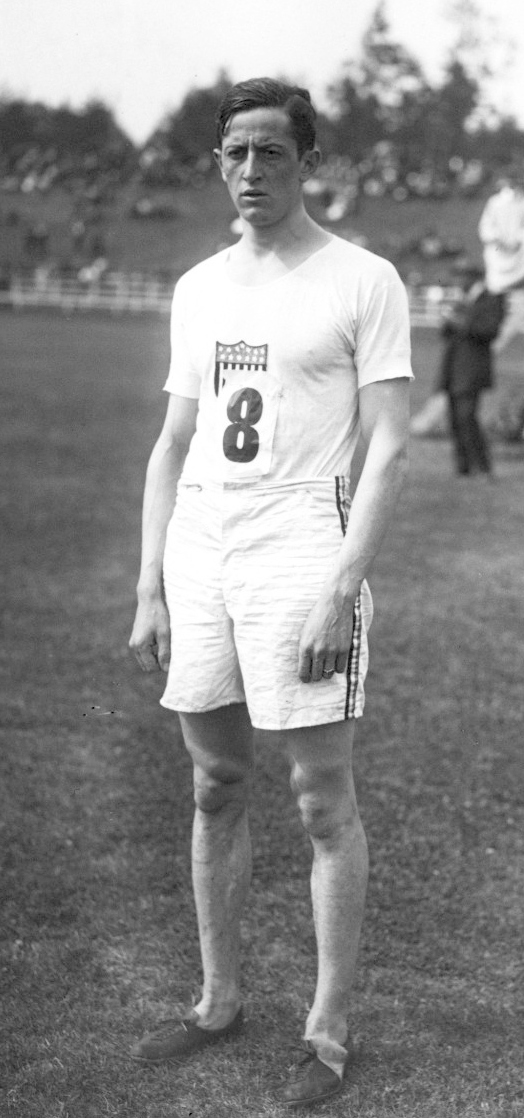
- James Rosenberger in 1912

Personal information
- Born: April 6, 1887 New York City, United States
- Died: January 1, 1946 (aged 58) Brooklyn, New York, United States
- Height: 1.86 m (6 ft 1 in)
- Weight: 73 kg (161 lb)

Sport
- Sport: Athletics
- Event: 100–400 m
- Club: I-AAC, Queens

Achievements and titles
- Personal bests: 100 m – 11.0 (1911); 200 m – 22.1 (1911); 400 m – 49.0 (1909)

James Maher Rosenberger (April 6, 1887 – January 1, 1946) was an American track and field athlete and a member of the Irish American Athletic Club. He was born in New York City and died in Brooklyn, New York.

In 1909, at the Amateur Athletic Union (AAU) metropolitan senior championships, held at Travers Island, Rosenberger took first place in 100 and 220 yard dash. The following week, Rosenberger was part of the Irish American Athletic Club's four-man relay team that broke the world's record for the one-mile relay with a time of 3 minutes 20 2/5 seconds. The other three men on the record-breaking team were C.S. Cassara, Melvin Sheppard, and William Robbins.

On April 9, 1911, Rosenberger anchored the Irish American Athletic Club 4×440 yard relay team that broke the world record at Celtic Park, Queens, New York and set the first IAAF- recognized world record for 4×440 yard or 4×400 meter relay race, in time of 3 minutes and 18.2 seconds. The other members of the world record-setting team were Harry Gissing, Mel Sheppard and Harry Schaaf.

Rosenberger participated in the 1912 Summer Olympics but was eliminated in a 400 m semifinal. Next year, he competed in Australia with the AAU team, and in 1915, he became the coach for the Long Island Athletic Club.
