= Joseph Bromilow =

American athlete

Joseph M. Bromilow, Jr. (October 20, 1881 – January 12, 1972) was an American athlete. He competed in the 1908 Summer Olympics in London and in the 1912 Summer Olympics in Stockholm, Sweden.

Born in Westhoughton, Lancashire, England, Bromilow moved with his family to Paterson, New Jersey, on May 18, 1889. He worked as a silk twister in Paterson and began competing in track as a member of the Irish American Athletic Club, which became one of the most dominant organizations in American track events. Its members included Olympic medalist Mel Sheppard, Bromilow's teammate in relays. Later, in 1908, he was in a relay team which set a world record in the 400 metres relay.

In the 800 metres at the 1908 London Olympics, Bromilow finished second in his initial semifinal heat and did not advance to the final. His time was 1:58.3.

He ran for the club which he represented in 1909 when he was part of a Canadian Championship 400-meter relay team. At the 1912 Olympic Games in Stockholm, he competed in the 400-, 800- and 1,500 metre races. In 1967, he was elected to the Paterson (N.J.) Sports Hall of Fame.

== Sources ==
- Bromilow, Joseph (1906–1923). "Private journals of Joseph Bromilow" (in Polish). Archived from the original on 14 October 2008.
- Cook, Theodore Andrea (May 1909). The Fourth Olympiad London 1908 Official Report (PDF). London: British Olympic Association. Archived from the original (PDF) on 2007-09-27.
- De Wael, Herman (2001). "Athletics 1908". Herman's Full Olympians. Archived from the original on 27 September 2006.
- Greenberg, Stan (1987). Olympic Games: The Records. London: Guinness Books. ISBN 0-85112-896-3.
- Wudarski, Pawel (1999). "Wyniki Igrzysk Olimpijskich" (in Polish). Archived from the original on 14 October 2008.
