= Frank Riley (athlete) =

Irish American athlete

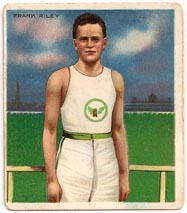
Frank Riley, wearing the 'Winged Fist' of the Irish American Athletic Club, from the 1910 Hassan Cigarettes trading card.

Frank Nicholas Riley (July 3, 1887 – October 30, 1950) was an American athlete, and member of the Irish American Athletic Club. He was a member of the U.S. Olympic team in the 1908 Summer Olympics in London.

"He ran third in the 1,500 meter run at the Olympic try-outs held in Franklin Fielid, Philadelphia, but did not place in the finals in London. At the Metropolitan A.A.U. Junior championships Riley won the mile title and later in the year ran a slashing race in the 880 yard Canadian championship, taking second place and forcing Emilio Lunghi to break the record. Riley was a prominent member of the Thirteenth Regiment A.A. and competed successfully on their relay team."

In the 1908 Summer Olympics - 1500 meters, Riley did not finish his initial semifinal heat and did not advance to the final.
