= Emil Muller (discus thrower) =

American discus thrower

Emil Joseph Muller (February 19, 1891 – February 25, 1958) was an American track and field athlete and a member of the Irish American Athletic Club who competed in the discus throwing events in the 1912 Summer Olympics. Muller was the Amateur Athletic Union discus champion 1912-14 and 1918. He was also a member of the New York City Police Department.

In the 1912 Summer Olympics, he finished sixth in the two handed discus throw competition, just behind fellow Irish American Athletic Club member and US Olympic team mate James Duncan, who won the bronze medal in the one-handed discus throw that year. Muller also participated in the discus throw event and finished twelfth.

In 1913, Muller competed against fellow Irish American Athletic Club member and nine-time Olympic medalist Martin Sheridan in the discus throw at the New York Metropolitan Association championship meet of the Amateur Athletic Union. Sheridan, who won four Olympic gold medals for throwing the discus (both Greek and Freestyle), came out of retirement from athletics to compete in this event, but was defeated by Muller who hurled the discus 133 feet, or 5 feet 6.5 inches further than Sheridan. (Martin Sheridan's brother Andrew J. Sheridan, also of the Irish American Athletic Club, came in 3rd place).
