= John J. Reynolds =

American distance runner

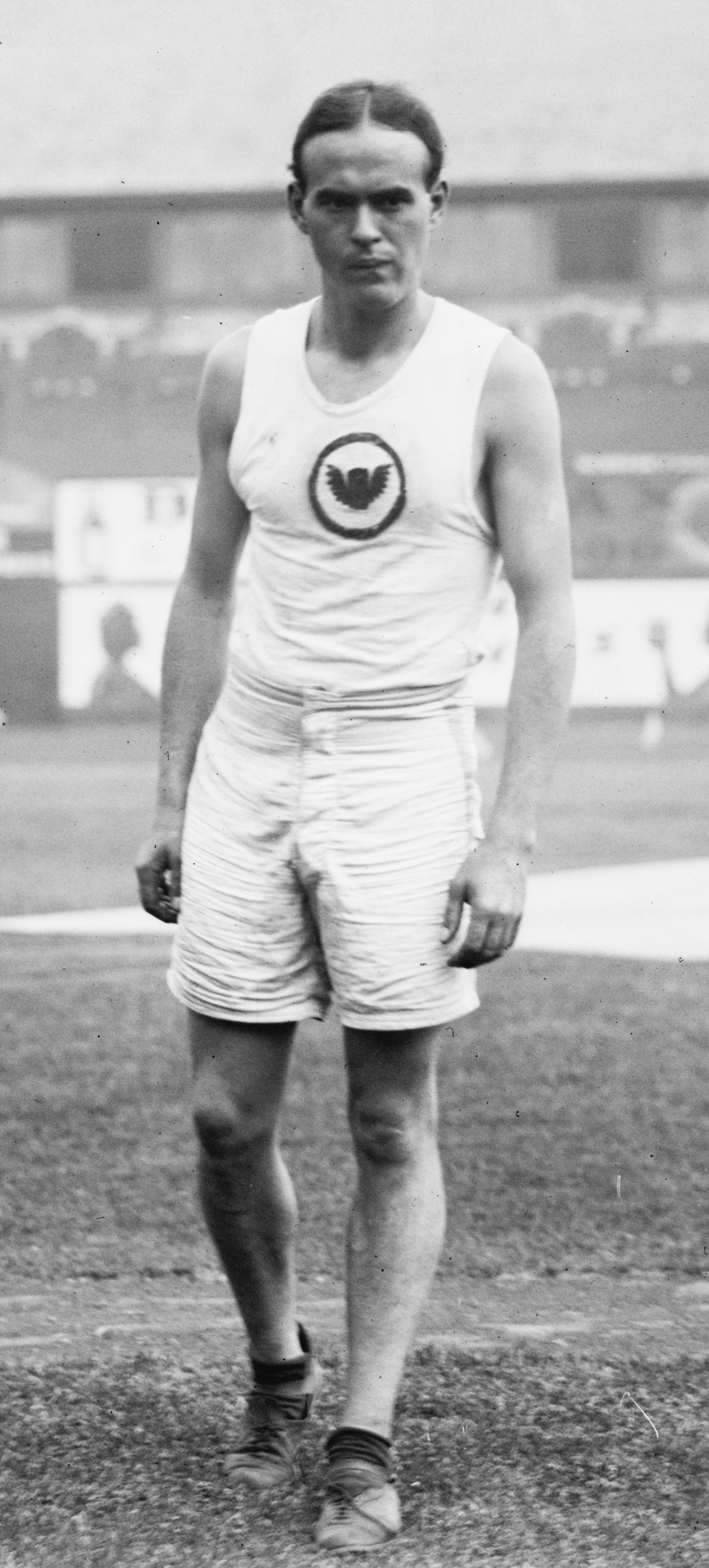
- John J. Reynolds wearing the Winged Fist of the Irish American Athletic Club

Personal information
- Born: August 9, 1889 New York, United States
- Died: June 1987 (aged 97)
- Height: 1.73 m (5 ft 8 in)
- Weight: 68 kg (150 lb)

Sport
- Sport: Long-distance running
- Club: I-AAC, Queens

John James Reynolds (August 9, 1889 – June 1987) was an American track and field athlete and a member of the Irish American Athletic Club. He was part of the U.S. Olympic team in the 1912 Olympics and competed in the Marathon, but did not complete the race, dropping out just short of the 19th mile.

In 1909, Reynolds finished 8th place in the Yonkers Marathon with a time of 3:01:40. In April 1910, Reynolds came in 6th place in the Boston Marathon, with a time of 2:40:03. In November 1910, Reynolds won the Yonkers Marathon. "Reynolds time was remarkable, being 2 hours 38 minutes 36 and 2/5 seconds for a course a trifle over 25 miles in length, five miles of which were through the crowded city streets of Yonkers." Other competitors in the race included William Galvin of the Yonkers Irish American Athletic Club, who came in third place and Sidney Hatch of the Chicago Irish American Athletic Club, who came in 5th place.

In 1911, Reynolds came in third place in the Yonkers Marathon, with Sidney Hatch competing for the Illinois State Gaelic A.A taking first, and William Galvin running for the Mercury A.C. coming in second. In 1913, Reynolds finished 2nd in the Yonkers Marathon with a time of 2:40:51, a minute and a half behind J. Duffy of the Ramblers Athletic Club of Toronto.
