= Harry Gissing =

American sprinter

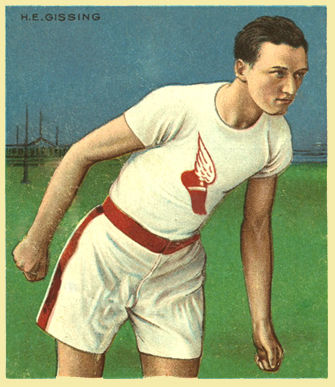
Harry Gissing, wearing the Winged Foot of the New York Athletic Club.

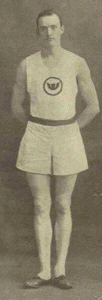
Harry Gissing, wearing the Winged Fist of the Irish American Athletic Club, 1911.

Harry E. Gissing (December 3, 1890 - November 29, 1963) was an American track and field athlete, a member of the New York Athletic Club, Mohawk Athletic Club, and the Irish American Athletic Club. In 1911, he was part of a world's record setting team in the 4×400 meter relay race.

== Biography ==
In 1908, Gissing won the A.A.U half-mile championship with a time of 1 minute 56 and 4/5 seconds. He came in first place in the 1,000 yard National A.A.U indoor championship three years running, 1908, 1909 and 1910. In 1909 Gissing also won the 880 yard New York Metropolitan A.A.U championship, and came in second place in the 880 yard Senior National A.A.U championship. As the anchor of the New York Athletic Club relay team, on many occasions he "turned apparent defeat into victory."

On April 9, 1911, Gissing was part of the Irish American Athletic Club 4×440 yard relay team that broke the world's record at Celtic Park, Queens, New York, and set the first IAAF- recognized world record for 4×440 yard or 4×400 meter relay race, with a time of 3 minutes and 18 4/5 seconds. The other members of the world's record setting team were; James Rosenberger, Harry Schaaf and Mel Sheppard.
