= Tom Collins (athlete) =

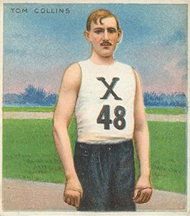
Tom Collins

Thomas J. Collins was an Irish-American athlete who became a distance runner after immigrating to the United States. He competed for the Xavier Athletic Club and the Irish American Athletic Club.

In 1906, Collins won the Amateur Athletic Union junior National cross country championships.

In 1908, in what The New York Times called "the greatest battle for athletic supremacy in the history of indoor track and field sports," Collins broke the world's record for the 5 mile distance at the indoor National championships of the A.A.U., held at Madison Square Garden, with a time of 25 minutes and 19.4 seconds. He lowered the record set by E.C. Carter of 25 minutes 23.6 seconds, which was set in 1887, and had stood for 21 years.

In 1910, in front of a crowd of more than 8,000 spectators at the field day of the Galway Athletic Club held at Celtic Park, Queens, New York, "the most interesting and probably best race of the day was seen in the four-mile handicap, which had Tom Collins of the Irish (American Athletic Club) and Eddie Fitzgerald of the New York Athletic Club" starting from scratch. "A baker's dozen of aspiring distance men were sent out on marks up to 300 yards," but Collins still came up victorious, beating Fitzgerald who came in 2nd, by a distance of 15 yards, with a time of 20 minutes and 40 seconds.
