= Irish American Athletic Club =

Athletic organization in Queens, New York

- Emblem of the Irish American Athletic Club
- Founded: January 30, 1898
- Type: Irish American sports club
- Location: Queens, New York, United States
- Official language: English
- Formerly called: Greater New York Irish Athletic Association

The Irish American Athletic Club was an amateur athletic organization, based in Queens, New York, at the beginning of the 20th century.

== Early years ==
Established on January 30, 1898, originally as the "Greater New York Irish Athletic Association", they shortened the name to the Irish American Athletic Club a few years later. They purchased a plot of land in what was then called Laurel Hill, Long Island, near Calvary Cemetery, Queens, and built a state-of-the-art athletic facility on what was farmland. The stadium, called Celtic Park, formally reopened after renovations on May 9, 1901, and until the facility was sold for housing in 1930, some of the greatest American athletes trained or competed on Celtic Park's track and field. The Irish American Athletic Club adopted a winged fist adorned with American flags and shamrocks as their emblem, with the Irish motto Láiṁ Láidir Abú (Strong hands forever) and were often referred to as the 'Winged Fists'. At one time they had clubs in Boston, Chicago, San Francisco and Yonkers, New York.

== Athletes ==
During the thirty odd years of its existence, all of the following athletes competed for the Irish American Athletic Club at some point; Dan Ahearn, and his brother Tim Ahearne, Charles Bacon, George Bonhag, Joseph Bromilow, Frank Castleman, Robert Cloughen, Harvey Cohn, Tom Collins, Edward Cook, James Crowley, John Daly, James H. Duncan, John Eller, John Flanagan, William Frank, Patrick J. Flynn, Harry Gissing, George E. Hall, Sidney Hatch, Johnny Hayes, Denis Horgan, Bill Horr, Daniel Kelly, Abel Kiviat, Hannes Kolehmainen, Emilio Lunghi, Alvah Meyer, James Mitchell, Pat McDonald, Matt McGrath, Emil Muller, Peter O'Connor, Edwin Pritchard, Harry Porter, Myer Prinstein, Richard Remer, John J. Reynolds, Frank Riley, William Robbins, Lawson Robertson, James Rosenberger, Michael J. Ryan, Pat Ryan, Harry Schaaf, Arthur Shaw, Mel Sheppard, Martin Sheridan, James P. Sullivan, Lee Talbott, John Baxter Taylor, Jr., Con Walsh, William Galvin and Harold Wilson.

== Non-Irish members ==
The Irish American Athletic Club was predominantly composed of Irish born and first generation Irish American athletes, but many of the athletes who competed for the Winged Fist organization were neither. Non-Irish members of the Irish American Athletic Club included; Bruno Brodd, Joseph Bromilow, John Eke, Egon Erickson, Myer Prinstein, Abel Kiviat, Hannes Kolehmainen, Alvah Meyer, Lawson Robertson, Harold Wilson, Emilio Lunghi and John Baxter Taylor, Jr. (the first African American to win an Olympic gold medal). Myer Prinstein, competing as a member of the Irish American Athletic Club in St. Louis 1904, won both the long jump and the hop, step and jump (now called the triple jump) on the same day, the only athlete ever to win both events in the same games. He also came 5th in both the 60 m dash and 400 m. In Athens 1906 he again won the long jump competition, beating the world record holder, Irishman, Peter O'Connor. Swedish-born Ernie Hjertberg, himself a US track and field champion, was appointed coach and recruited outstanding non-Irish athletes. Under his leadership, the IAAC turned into a national track power.

== National championships and Olympic medals ==
The Irish American Athletic Club won the Amateur Athletic Union national outdoor track and field team championship titles in; 1904, 1906, 1907, 1908, 1910, 1911, 1912, 1913, 1914 and 1916. They also won the national indoor track and field team championship titles in; 1906, 1908, 1909, 1911, 1913, 1914 and 1915. Individual athletes of the IAAC won 81 national outdoor championships titles and 36 individual national indoor championship titles. From 1900 to 1924, men who were at one time members of the Irish American Athletic Club won 54 Olympic medals for the U.S. Olympic team, including 26 gold medals.

== Olympic participation ==
In addition to winning numerous local and regional Amateur Athletic Union competitions, Irish American Athletic Club members competed for the U.S. Olympic team in the 1900 Olympic Games in Paris, the 1904 Olympic Games in St. Louis, the 1906 Intercalated Games in Athens, Greece, the 1908 Olympics in London, the 1912 Olympics in Stockholm and the 1920 Olympic Games in Antwerp.

== 1908 Olympics ==
In the 1908 Olympic Games, in London, England, members of the Irish American Athletic Club won 10 of the U.S. Olympic team's total 23 gold medals, or as many as the nations of France, Germany and Italy combined. The members of the Irish American Athletic Club who were medalists in the 1908 Olympic Games were; Charles Bacon, 400 meter hurdles, gold; George Bonhag, 3 mile team race, silver; Robert Cloughen, 200 metres race, silver; John Flanagan, hammer throw, gold; Johnny Hayes, marathon, gold; Bill Horr, discus-free style, bronze, discus-Greek style, silver; Matt McGrath, hammer throw, silver; Harry Porter, high jump, gold; Melvin Sheppard, 800 metres race, gold, 1,500 metres race, gold, 1,600 metres medley relay, gold; and Martin Sheridan, discus-free style, gold, discus-Greek style, gold, and standing long jump, bronze; and John Baxter Taylor, Jr., who passed the baton to Mel Sheppard, to win the gold in the 1,600 meter medley relay, becoming the first African-American to win an Olympic gold medal. Other Irish American Athletic Club members of the 1908 U.S. Olympic team included; Joseph Bromilow, Harvey Cohn, Daniel Kelly, Frank Riley, William Robbins, Lawson Robertson, Michael J. Ryan, James P. Sullivan and Lee Talbott.

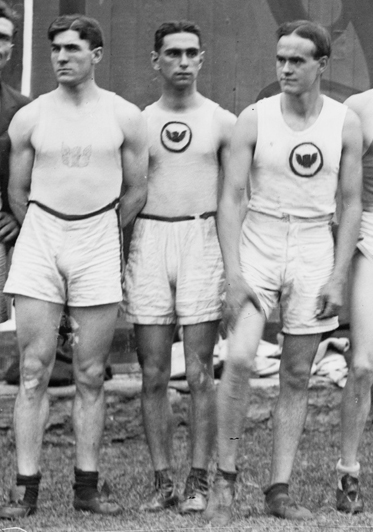
John Eller, Abel Kiviat and John J. Reynolds of the Irish American Athletic Club, posing for a 1912 U.S. Olympic team photo.

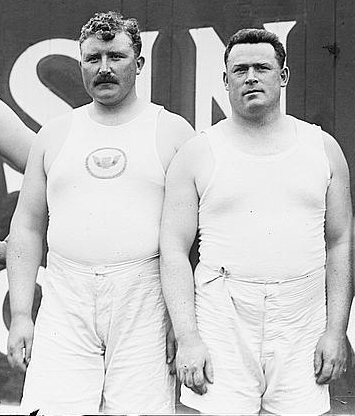
Irish Whales: Pat McDonald and Matt McGrath of the Irish American Athletic Club, posing for a 1912 U.S. Olympic team photo.

== 1910 point champions ==
"With a grand total of 2,001 points gained by their track and field men in 1910, the Irish-American Athletic Club had put to its credit a score said to be greater than that of any similar aggregation of athletes during any single year," according to the New York Times. "Eighty-nine men contributed to this splendid showing, gaining points only in track and field games."

== 1912 Olympics ==
Thirteen members of the Irish American Athletic Club competed as part of the U.S. Olympic team at the 1912 Olympic Games in Stockholm, Sweden, winning a total of five gold medals, four silver medals and one bronze medal. The IAAC medalists on the 1912 U.S. Olympic team were; George Bonhag, 3,000 meter team race, Abel Kiviat, gold, 3,000 meter team race, and silver, 1,500 meter race; Pat McDonald, gold, shot put, and silver, shot put, both hands; Mel Sheppard, gold, 4 × 400 meter relay, and silver, 800 meter race; Matt McGrath, gold, hammer throw, Alvah Meyer, silver, 100 meter race, and Jim Duncan, discus throw, bronze. The other IAAC members of the 1912 U.S. Olympic team were; John Eller, Emil Muller, Edwin Pritchard, John J. Reynolds, James Rosenberger and Michael J. Ryan.

== American Amateur Hockey League ==
In 1912–13, 1913–14, 1914–15 and 1916–17 the Irish American Athletic Club had a team, the New York Irish-Americans, represented in the American Amateur Hockey League. The team was coached by James C. "Jimmy" O'Brien and had on its roster for various seasons future NHL players Tom McCarthy and Moylan McDonnell. John McGrath and Patsy Séguin also played for the club.

== Final championship title – 1916 ==
Before the largest crowd that had ever assembled to see a track meet in the United States, on September 9, 1916, the Irish American Athletic Club defeated the New York Athletic Club at the Amateur Athletic Union's National Championships, by a score of 38 to 27. Before a crowd of 30,000 spectators at Newark, New Jersey's Weequahic Park, the Irish-American Athletic Club won what would be their last national championship title. The club disbanded a year later, when the U.S. became a combatant in the First World War.

== See also ==
- Irish Whales

== Sources ==
- Cook, Theodore Andrea (May 1909). The Fourth Olympiad London 1908 Official Report (PDF). London: British Olympic Association. Archived from the original (PDF) on 2007-09-27.
- Greenberg, Stan (1987). Olympic Games: The Records. London: Guinness Books. ISBN 0-85112-896-3.
- Katchen, Alan (2008). Abel Kiviat, National Champion: Twentieth-Century Track & Field and the Melting Pot. Syracuse, New York: Syracuse University Press. ISBN 978-0-8156-0939-1.
- Kieran, John (1977). The Story of the Olympic Games; 776 B.C. to 1976. Philadelphia and New York: J.B. Lippincott Company. ISBN 0-397-01168-7.
- Lee, Joseph; Casey, Marion (2006). Making the Irish American: History and Heritage of the Irish in the United States. New York: Glucksman Ireland House / NYU Press. ISBN 978-0-8147-5208-1.
- McCarthy, Kevin (2010). Gold, Silver and Green: The Irish Olympic Journey 1896–1924. Cork, Ireland: Cork University Press. ISBN 978-1-85918-458-5.
- Sullivan, James E. (1912). The Olympic Games Stockholm - 1912 (PDF). New York: American Sports Publishing Company. Archived from the original (PDF) on 2008-04-10.
