= James Duncan (discus thrower) =

American discus thrower

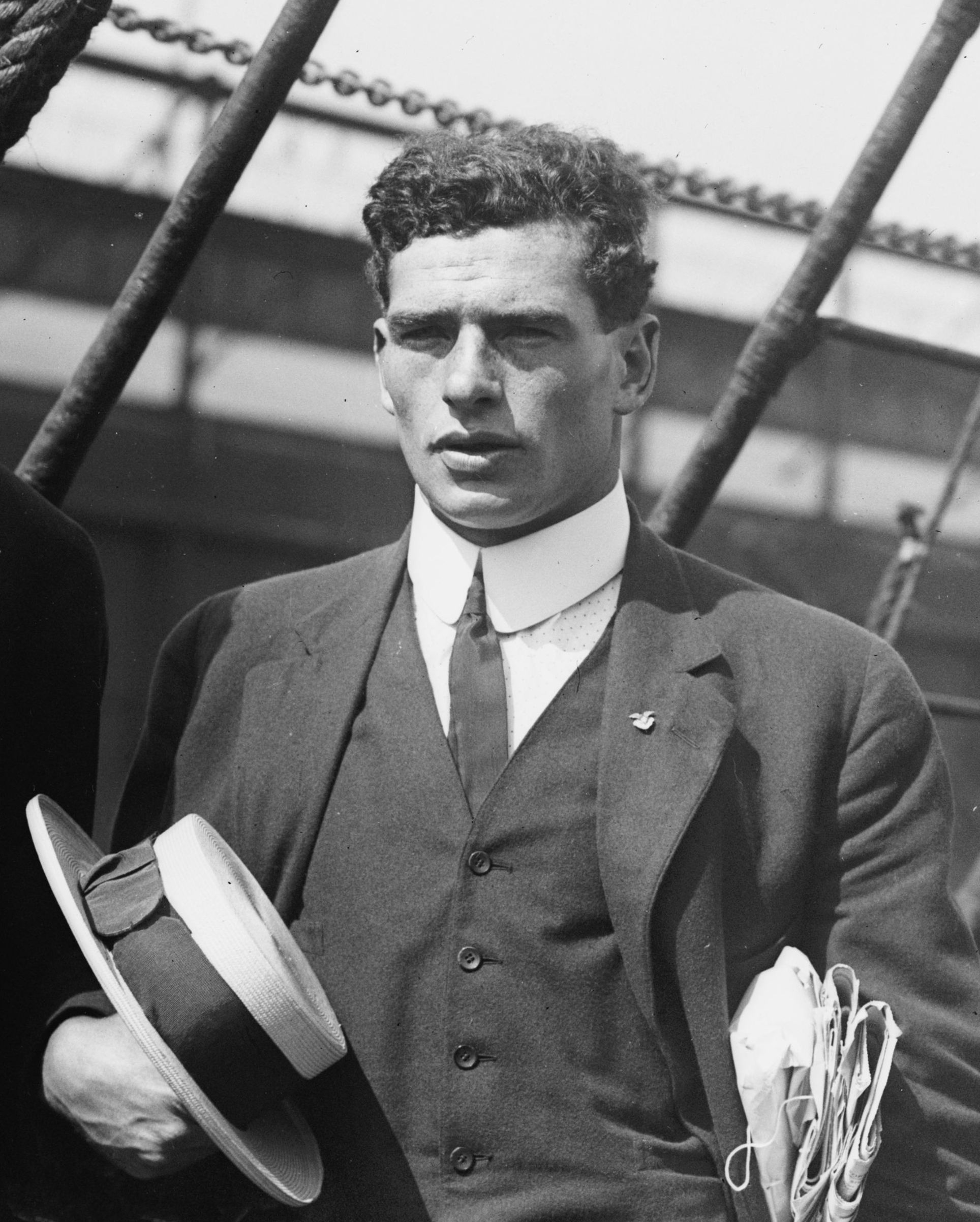
- James Duncan in 1913

Personal information
- Born: September 25, 1887 New York, United States
- Died: January 21, 1955 (aged 67)
- Height: 1.78 m (5 ft 10 in)
- Weight: 86 kg (190 lb)

Sport
- Sport: Athletics
- Event: Discus throw
- Club: Mohawk Athletic Club; Bradhurst Field Club; Irish American Athletic Club

Achievements and titles
- Personal best: 47.59 m (1912)
Medal record
Representing the United States
Olympic Games
Bronze medal – third place	1912 Stockholm	Discus throw

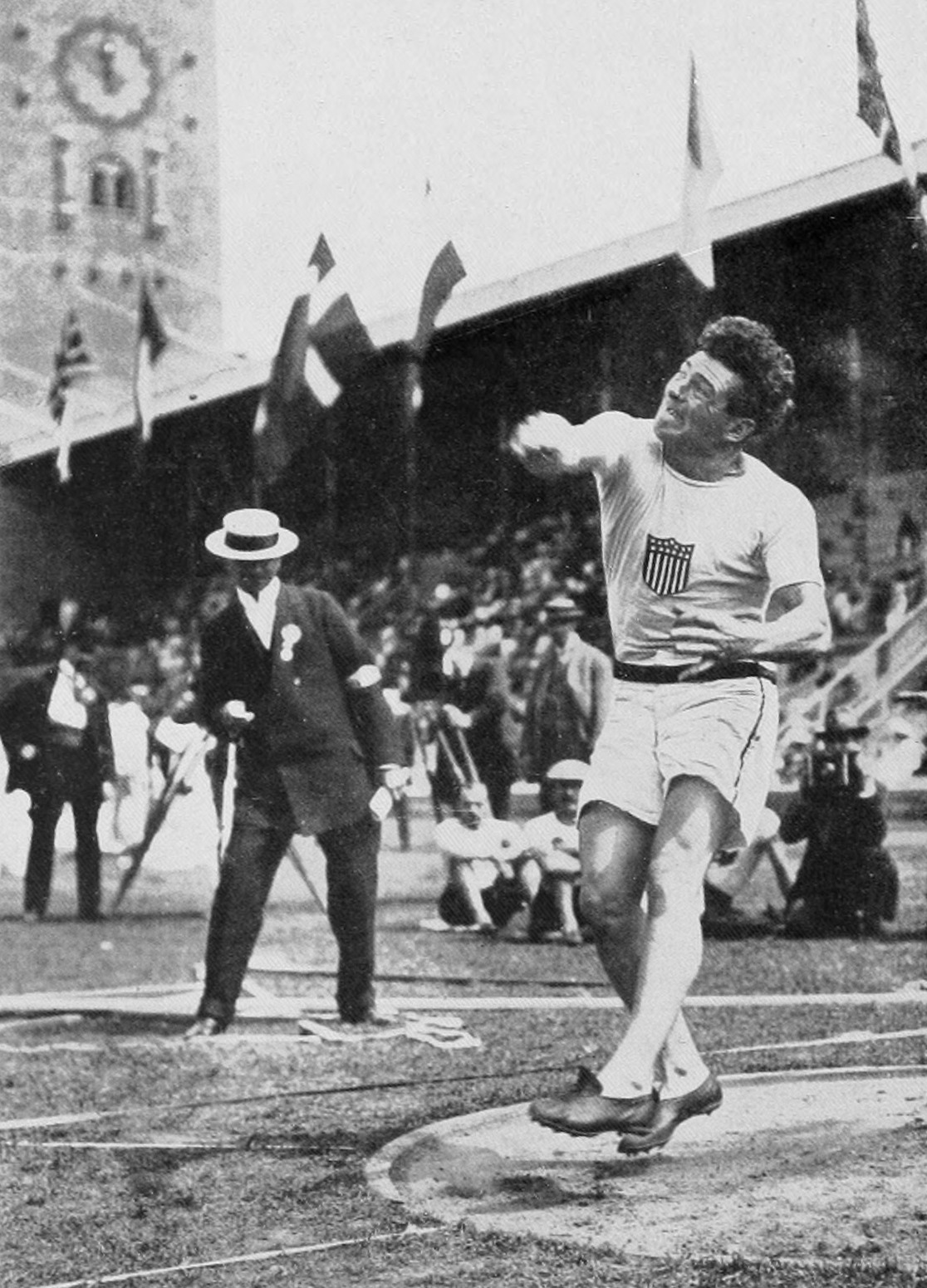
Duncan hurling the discus at the 1912 Summer Olympics

James Henry Duncan (September 25, 1887 – January 21, 1955) was an American discus thrower who won a bronze medal at the 1912 Summer Olympics. During World War I he rose to the rank of Lieutenant in the U.S. Army.

== World record ==
Duncan was the first holder of the official world discus record. On May 26, 1912, he hurled the discus with his right hand 156 feet 1¾ inches (47.59) at the Irish American Athletic Club's track & field, Celtic Park in Queens, New York. On the same day, he hurled the discus 96 feet 7.5 inches, with his left hand, breaking the world's record for right and left hands combined with a distance of 252 feet 8 and 7/8 inches. This throw was recognized by the IAAF when they issued their inaugural list of records in 1912.

== Military career ==
Duncan was a Lieutenant in the U.S. Army, Expeditionary Forces during World War I. He was attached to the 11th Company of Engineers. He served in five offensive and one defensive sectors. After his discharge from the U.S. Army, he stayed in France, married a French woman and opened a gymnasium in Paris. He was also the caretaker and manager of the American Military Cemetery at Suresnes, near Paris and corresponded with many American mothers, informing them of his visits to their sons graves.

In 1920, he was offered the position of trainer for the French Olympic athletes training for the 1920 Olympic Games in Antwerp. In 1927, his 3-year-old daughter, Jacqueline Duncan won a beauty competition, being voted "the healthiest and most beautiful child of more than 30,000 who entered a competition organized by one of the leading Paris newspapers."

Duncan was critically injured in 1932, when in an apparent suicide attempt, he shot himself three times, with two bullets lodging in his abdomen. He was in France. He died on January 21, 1955.

Records
Preceded by Incumbent	Men's Discus World Record Holder; May 27, 1912 – September 14, 1924	Succeeded by (United States) Thomas Lieb
