= Fierljeppen =

Traditional sport

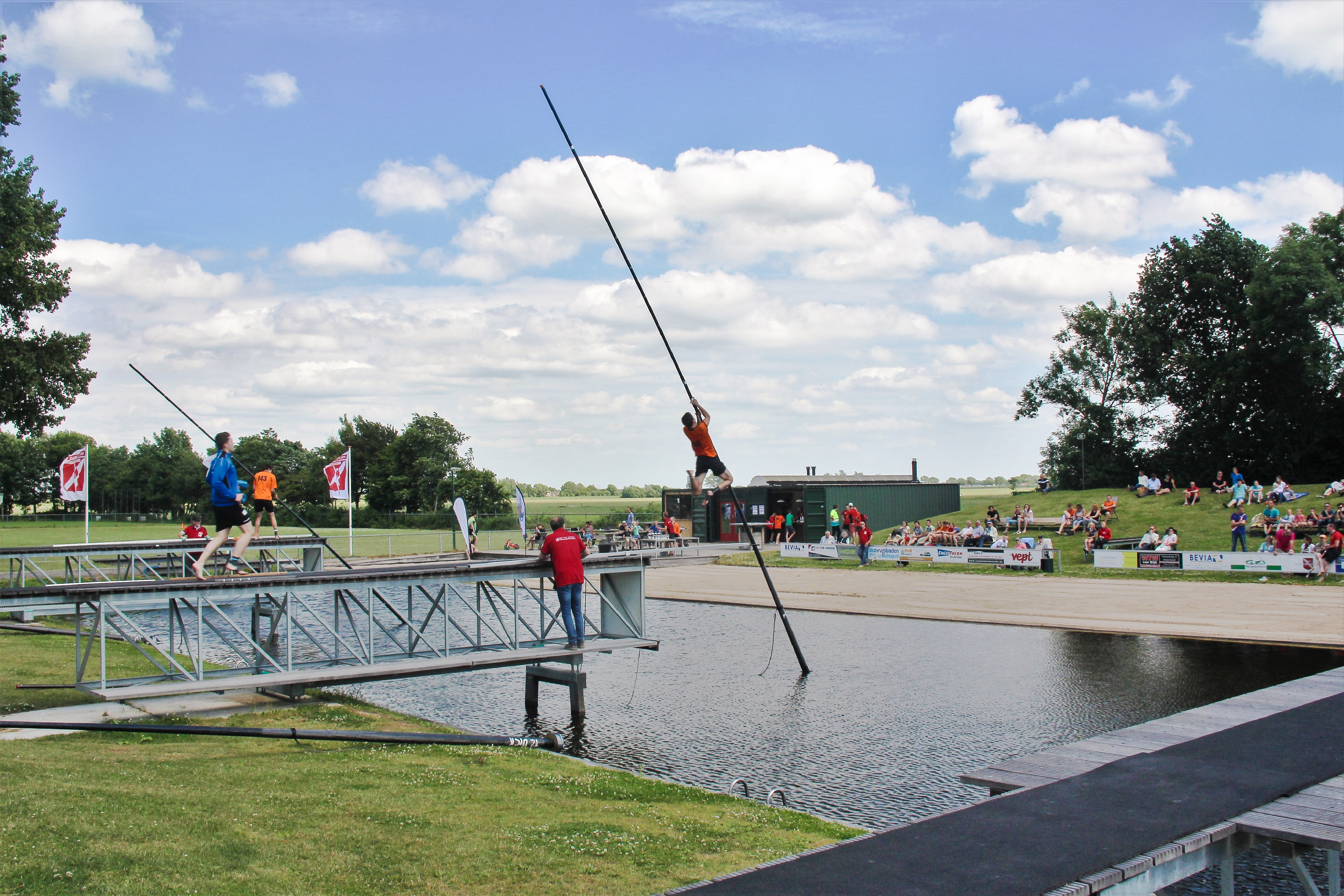
Fierljeppen in Linschoten

Newsreel footage of the 1961 Fierljeppen Championships in Winsum

Fierljeppen (West Frisian compound of fier—"far" and ljeppen—"leaping") or polsstokverspringen is a traditional sport of the Netherlands, and of West Frisian people in the Dutch province of Fryslân. The sport is also traditionally popular in the province of Utrecht which produced record holder Jaco de Groot and Theo van Kooten.

== Description ==
The sport involves a long pole and a body of water. Modern poles are made of carbon fibre. The pole is between 8 and 13 metres (26 and 43 ft) long and has a flat round plate at the bottom to prevent it from sinking into the muddy river or canal bottom. Its material has evolved from wood which was heavy but prone to breakage to aluminium and currently to carbon-fiber reinforced polymers.

A jump consists of a sprint to the pole (polsstok), jumping and grabbing it, then climbing to the top of the pole while trying to control its forward and lateral movements over a body of water, and finishing by landing on a sand bed opposite to the starting point.

== History ==
The Netherlands has many waterways. Fierljeppen originated as a way for Frisian people to get around the waterways easily. Over time it turned into a competition with the first official match in 1771 but the sport was not properly structured until 1957. The sport is believed to have originated with farmers who used poles to leap over small water drainage channels to access different plots of land. In the German region of East Frisia this sport is known as Pultstockspringen. Today it is a competitive sport, with an official annual National Fierljepping Manifestation (NFM) in the Netherlands and championships contested in six leagues and numerous clubs. According to fierljeppen historian Wim Roskam, it took on its modern competitive form in the 1950s and 1960s.

== Record holders ==
The current Dutch record holders by category are:

- Seniors: 22.21 metres (72 ft 10 in), Jaco de Groot from Woerden, Utrecht (12 August 2017, Zegveld)
- Veterans: 20.70 metres (67 ft 11 in), Thewis Hobma from Harlingen, Friesland (21 June 2025, Burgum)
- Ladies: 18.19 metres (59 ft 8 in) Marrit van der Wal from It Heidenskip, Friesland (31 July 2019, Burgum)
- Juniors (under 20): 21.87 metres (71 ft 9 in), Germ Terpstra from Tzum, Friesland (5 July 2025, Jaarsveld)
- Boys (under 16): 20.72 metres (68 ft 0 in), Wisse Broekstra from Winsum, Friesland (19 September 2020, Burgum)
- Girls (under 16): 17.63 metres (57 ft 10 in), Hanneke Westert from IJlst, Friesland (24 August 2022, Burgum)
- Foreigners (Not native of Netherlands): 19.64 metres (64 ft 5 in), Alan Barth from Canada (19 August 2002, Burgum)

There are 532 registered active jumpers in the world; of those, 190 are from the Netherlands.

== Fierljeppen throughout the world ==
International tourists who have visited Friesland and the Lek regions and observed the sport have helped to spread its popularity across the globe. Competitions in other locales now take place, albeit at a less competitive level due to smaller numbers of athletes and the lack of suitable locations.

Many Americans were first introduced to the sport, referred to as "ditch-vaulting", on the twelfth season of The Amazing Race. This same task would be performed in the twenty-first and thirty-first seasons as a "Switchback" task.

== See also ==
- Pole vault
- Shepherd's leap
