= John Eller =

American track and field athlete

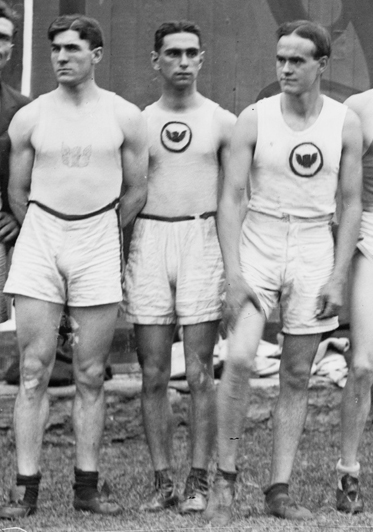
- John Eller, Abel Kiviat and John J. Reynolds in 1912

Personal information
- Born: October 15, 1883 New Jersey, United States
- Died: January 20, 1967 (aged 83) Cutchogue, New York, United States
- Height: 1.75 m (5 ft 9 in)
- Weight: 66 kg (146 lb)

Sport
- Sport: Athletics
- Club: I-AAC, Queens

John Jacob ("Jack" or J.J.) Eller, Jr. (October 15, 1883 – January 20, 1967) was an American track and field athlete, a member of the Irish American Athletic Club and a member of the New York City Police Department from 1905 to 1942. Eller was a five-time Amateur Athletic Union champion in the 220 yard low hurdles between 1907 and 1912. He competed as a member of the U.S. Olympic team in the 1912 Summer Olympics. (John's brother Robert Eller was also an athlete, who competed for Fordham University and the Irish American Athletic Club.

In 1910, Eller was considered 'King of the Hurdlers.' "He held the world's record for the 220 yard, 2 foot 6 inch hurdle made at Travers Island in 1908, the time being 24 4/6 seconds and also the 220 yard 3ft. 6in. hurdles made at Celtic Park in October 1908 in 27 and 3/5 seconds." Also, in 1908, Eller won the 150 yard, 200 yard and 220 yard hurdle indoor championships, securing three first prizes all in one night. In 1909, Eller won both the 120 yard high hurdle and the 220 yard low hurdles, coming close to securing a record in the latter."

In 1912, he was eliminated in the semi-finals of the 110 metre hurdles competition. He also participated in the pentathlon event but quit after three disciplines, with the victory going to Jim Thorpe.

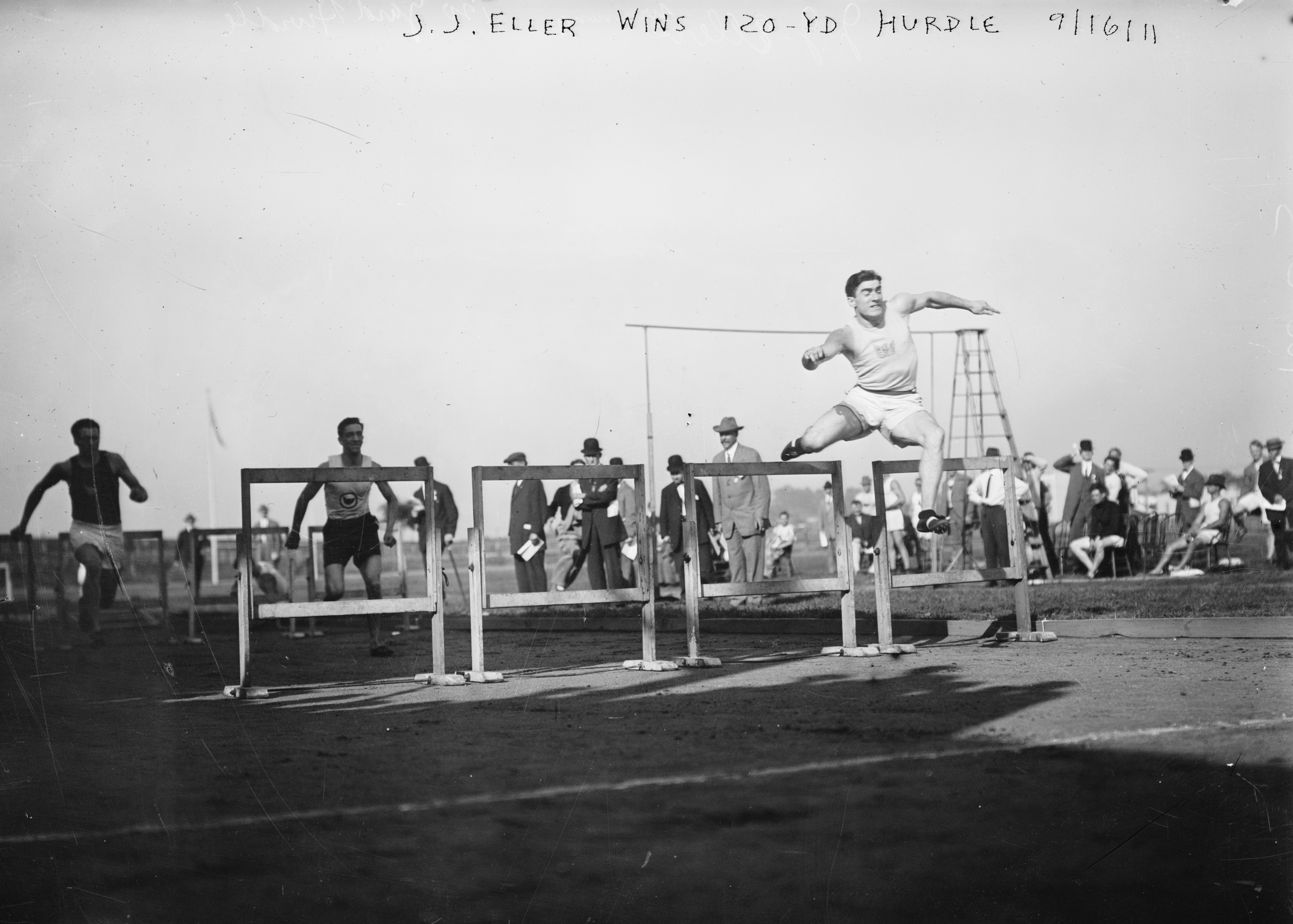
John Jacob Eller Jr. defeating fellow Irish American Athletic Club member I.K. Lovell and A. McGowan of the New York Athletic Club (not shown) in the 120 yard hurdle race, held September 16, 1911, at Celtic Park in Queens, NY.
