= Celtic Park (Queens) =

Former athletic facility in New York

- Emblem of the Irish American Athletic Club

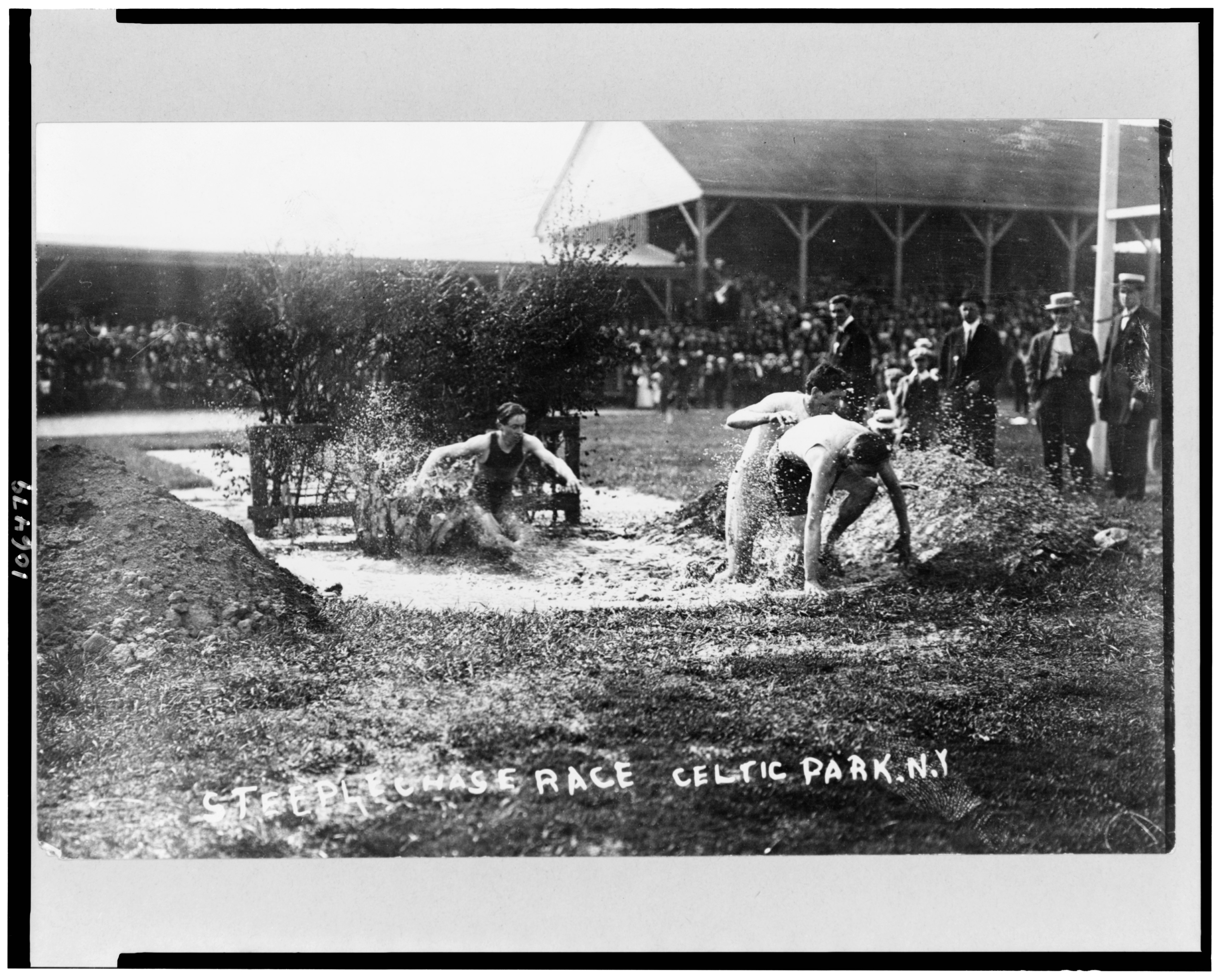
- A steeplechase race at Celtic Park in 1912
- Interactive map of Celtic Park
- Location: Sunnyside, Queens, New York City
- Coordinates: 40°44′22″N 73°55′21″W
- Owner: Irish American Athletic Club
- Capacity: 2,500 (grandstand); attendance up to 15,000+ at major events

Construction
- Opened: 1898
- Renovated: 1901, 1910
- Closed: 1930
- Demolished: 1930

Tenants
- Greater New York Irish Athletic Association (1898–1904); Irish American Athletic Club (1904–1930)

Celtic Park was an athletic facility in Sunnyside, Queens, New York City, that operated from 1898 to 1930 as the home grounds of the Irish American Athletic Club (IAAC). Its members, drawn largely from Irish-American immigrants, won 26 gold, 22 silver, and 8 bronze medals for the United States at the Summer Olympics between 1900 and 1924, and Celtic Park hosted Amateur Athletic Union championships, including the 1912 All-Around championship, won by Jim Thorpe. A 1922 Volstead Act enforcement raid at a labor-union picnic on the grounds wounded four people by gunfire and contributed to the club's postwar decline.

After a brief late-1920s use as a greyhound-racing track, the field was sold in 1930 to the City and Suburban Homes Company and developed as the Celtic Park Apartments, a 756-unit garden-apartment complex bounded by 42nd to 44th Streets between 48th and 50th Avenues that straddles present-day Sunnyside and Woodside. The first apartment building, completed in 1931–32, was designed by Ernest Flagg; the five subsequent buildings, completed between 1933 and 1938, were designed by Springsteen & Goldhammer. The complex was converted to cooperative ownership in May 1986.

In 2012 the New York City Council co-named 43rd Street between 48th and 50th Avenues, which bisects the apartment complex, "Winged Fist Way" to commemorate the IAAC and its athletic facility.

== Site and predecessor land use ==
The site lies in western Queens in what was historically known as the Laurel Hill neighborhood, on rising ground near Calvary Cemetery within the wider Long Island City district. In 1897 the Greater New York Irish Athletic Association, a working-class athletic club founded earlier that year by P. J. Conway, purchased a parcel of about 7 acres (2.8 ha) from George Thomson for $9,000. The association held its formal organizational meeting on January 30, 1898, at "The Annex," a Manhattan venue at Sixty-sixth Street and Third Avenue, with 100 members enrolling at that meeting. The club chose the site for its proximity to the trolley line serving Calvary Cemetery, which made the new field accessible to the Irish-Catholic working-class neighborhoods of Manhattan and Queens. The streets bordering the parcel were later renumbered as 42nd Street, 43rd Street, 44th Street, 48th Avenue, and 50th Avenue, replacing Madden, Laurel Hill, Locust, Anable, and Gould Avenues respectively.

== Athletic facility (1898–1930) ==
=== Construction and facilities ===
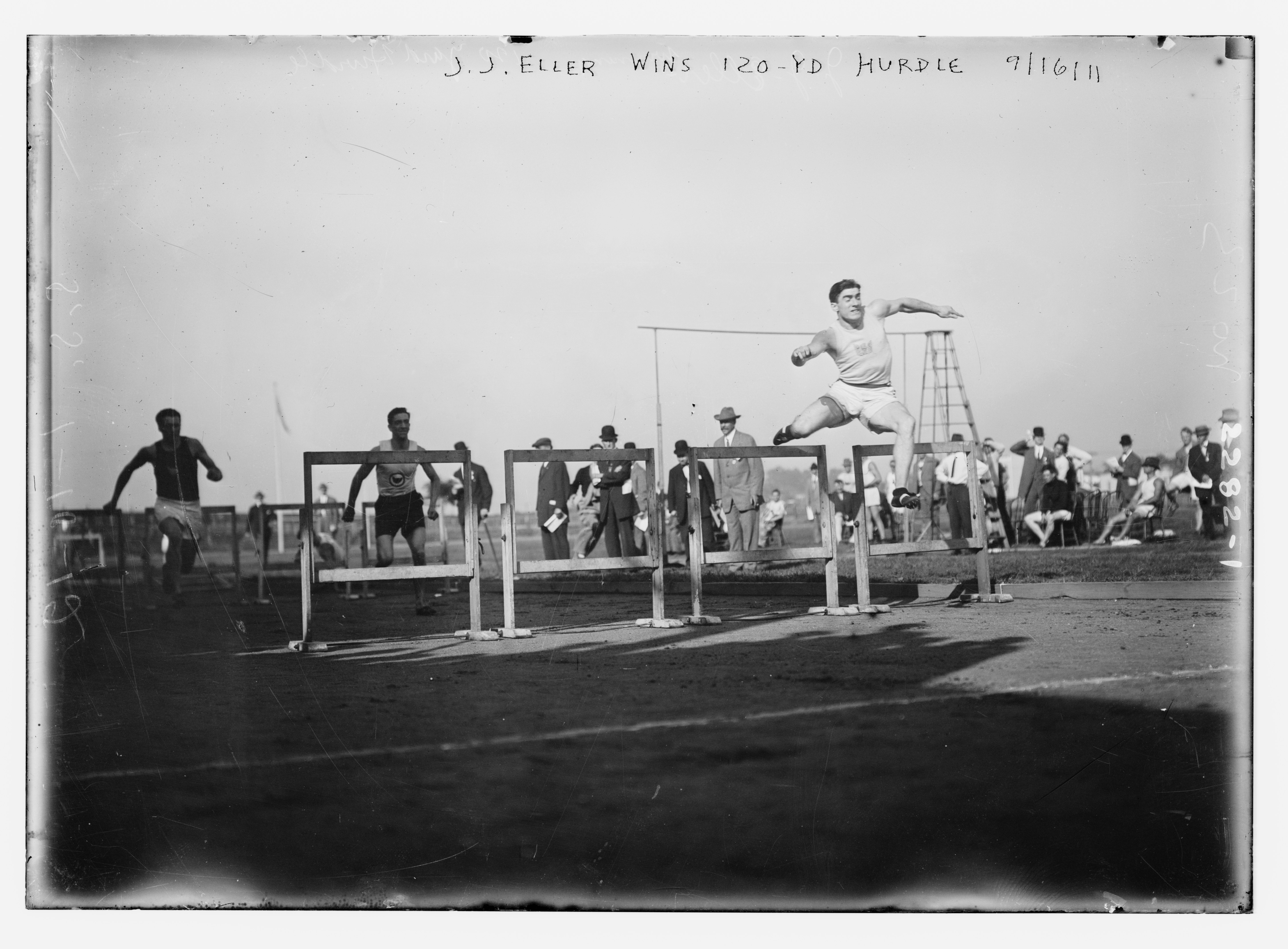
J. J. Eller winning the 120-yard hurdles at Celtic Park in 1911

The Greater New York Irish Athletic Association laid out a track-and-field oval and a grandstand on the parcel during 1898 and held its first competitions there that year; the original plans called for a 1/3-mile (540 m) track and a grandstand seating 5,000, both of which were reduced when the park was rebuilt in 1900–1901. The grounds were extensively remodeled over the winter of 1900–1901, and Celtic Park reopened on Decoration Day, May 30, 1901, with what The New York Times had previewed as "one of the most completely equipped places of the kind about the city"; about 5,000 spectators attended a carnival combining track-and-field events, a Gaelic football match between the O'Connells and Young Irelands clubs, and Irish reels and jigs. The two-story clubhouse, measuring 104 by 120 feet (32 by 37 m), contained bowling alleys, sitting rooms, a kitchen, and a restaurant accommodating 1,000 patrons in the basement; on the floor above were a café, dressing rooms, a reception room, private dining rooms, and an 80-by-100-foot (24 by 30 m) dance hall with no internal supports, all opening onto piazzas with views of the track and the Manhattan skyline. The clubhouse was registered as a hotel, a designation that allowed it to serve alcohol on Sundays despite the state's blue laws. The running surface was a circular 1/4-mile (400 m) track, with an enclosed grandstand seating 2,500 on its west side and separate fields in the center and northeast of the park laid out for baseball, cricket, polo, and football, and a 500-foot (150 m) rifle range with four ranges for "match shoots" along the east side. Conway, in a 1931 interview, recalled the original grandstand as having held 8,000 spectators with 12,000 attending the inaugural meet. (Note: In 1901, The New York Times reported the rebuilt grandstand as having a seating capacity of 2,500.)

In 1904 the club incorporated as the Irish American Athletic Club, and on May 28, 1910, it formally opened a new clubhouse at 110 East 59th Street in Manhattan with a series of boxing bouts.

In 1914, as the surrounding neighborhood urbanized, the IAAC negotiated with New York City to keep the athletic field intact: the club's directors granted the city free easements through the property for sewer mains, and in exchange a city plan to cut streets through Celtic Park was set aside. The New York Times described Celtic Park at the time as "one of the largest athletic fields in New York." Later that month, after several real estate syndicates approached the club to buy the property outright, Conway publicly denied any intention to sell, telling the Times that "I wouldn't be surprised if we held the property for the next twenty years."

=== Notable events and athletes ===
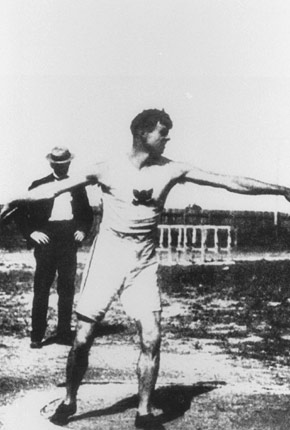
Martin Sheridan of the Irish American Athletic Club throwing the discus at the 1904 Olympics; in 1910 he set a discus world record at a Celtic Park meet.

Between 1898 and the early 1920s, Celtic Park was a regular venue for AAU competitions, Irish "Tailteann"-style games, and meets attended by athletes preparing for the United States Olympic team. The IAAC's "Winged Fist" team produced gold-medal winners including discus thrower Martin Sheridan (whose nine Olympic medals across the 1904, 1906, and 1908 Games include several no longer recognized by the IOC), hammer thrower John Flanagan (gold 1900, 1904, 1908), shot putter Patrick "Babe" McDonald (gold in shot put 1912; in 56-pound weight throw 1920), hammer thrower Matt McGrath (gold 1912; silver 1908, 1924), middle-distance runner Mel Sheppard (gold 1908 in the 800-meter, 1500-meter, and medley relay), and marathoner Johnny Hayes (gold 1908). Multiple AAU All-Around Championships, then considered the precursor to the modern decathlon, were contested at the park; the New York Times issue of October 10, 1910 reported that Sheridan had thrown the discus 142 feet 2 inches (43.33 m) at a meet there the previous day, calling it a world record.

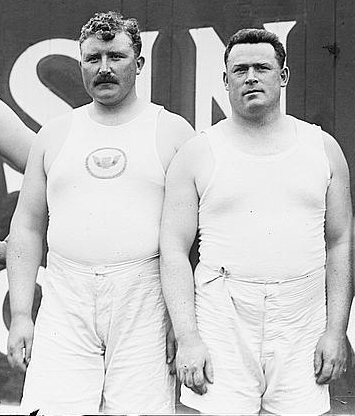
Pat McDonald and Matt McGrath of the Irish American Athletic Club, the weight-throwing Irish Whales, who both won Olympic gold in 1912.

In 1912, Jim Thorpe won the AAU All-Around championship at Celtic Park, an event Sheridan had won in 1907 and 1909.

Sports historian Bill Mallon has called the Irish American Athletic Club the dominant United States club in Olympic track and field before World War II. Rival organizations, including the wealthier and more established New York Athletic Club, whose own emblem was the winged foot of Mercury, regularly sent teams to compete against the "Winged Fists" at Celtic Park. According to Ian McGowan, about 20 of the club's members were among the 120 American athletes at the 1908 London Games and won at least 10 of the United States' 23 gold medals, a total matching the combined tally of France, Germany, and Italy. At a dinner for the returning American team at the Waldorf-Astoria, James E. Sullivan, the American commissioner to the Games, said the club "could have won the world's championship without the assistance of any other organization."

The club also drew part of its strength from recruiting athletes whom wealthier and more exclusive clubs overlooked, among them immigrant, Jewish, and African-American members. The sprinter John Baxter Taylor Jr., the IAAC's most prominent African-American member, became the first African American to win an Olympic gold medal, running a leg of the United States medley relay team that won at the 1908 Games alongside the club's Mel Sheppard; he died of typhoid pneumonia five months later. Among its other members was Myer Prinstein, the first Jewish American to win an Olympic gold medal, who took long- and triple-jump titles at the 1900, 1904, and 1906 Games.

Bernie Wefers, a former world-record holder in the 100- and 220-yard dashes, served as Celtic Park's manager for the IAAC during the 1900s, training Irish American Athletic Club sprinters before joining the New York Athletic Club.

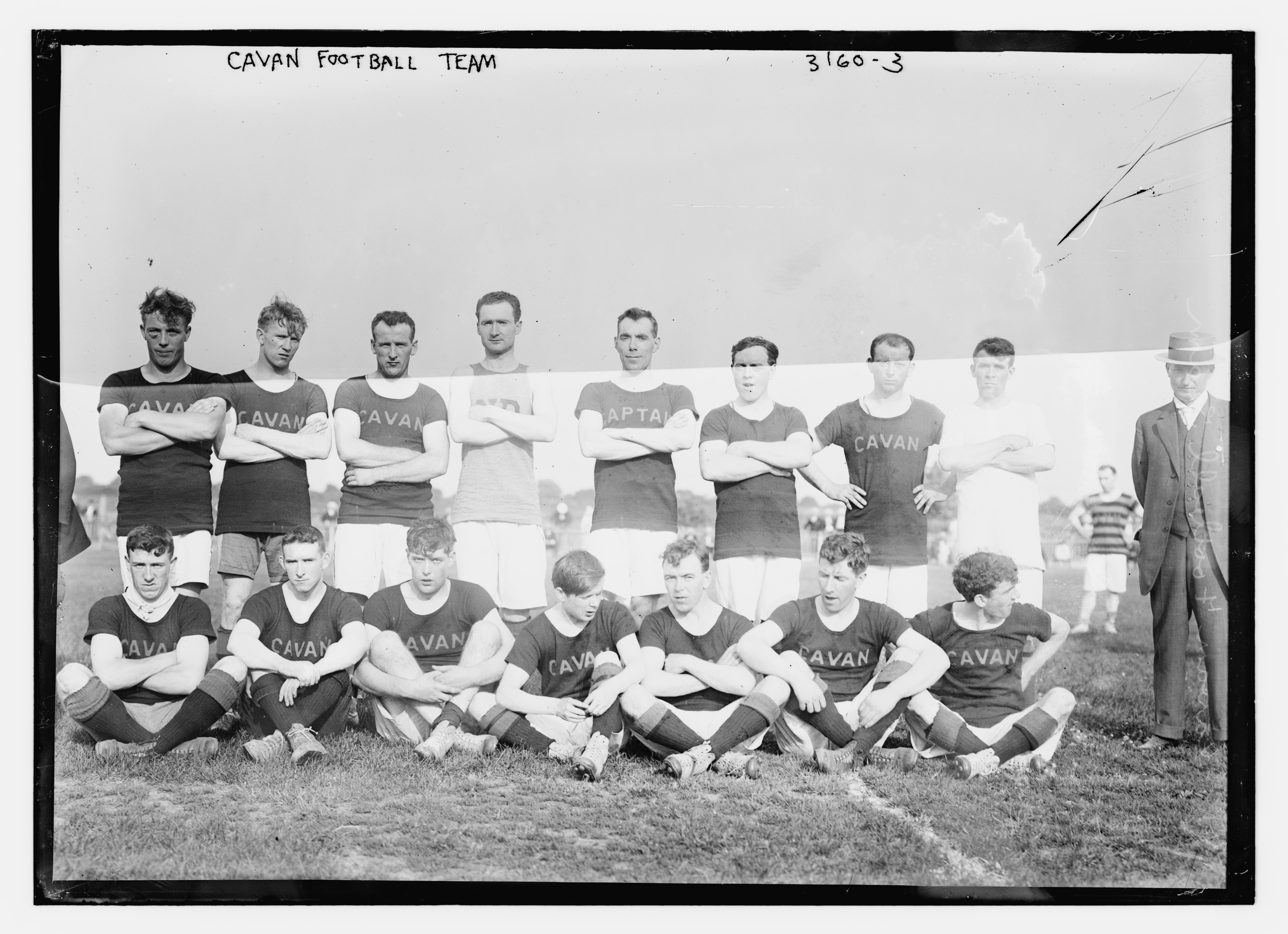
The Cavan Gaelic football team, which met Leitrim at Celtic Park in 1914

Hurling matches between Irish-American Gaelic athletic clubs were a regular feature at the park; in November 1901 The Sun reported a hurling contest between the T. F. Meaghers and the John Dalys clubs paired with a tug-of-war between teams from the Brewers' Association and the Eccentric Firemen, on which about $2,000 in side bets had been wagered. Gaelic football matches between teams representing Irish counties were also held; an April 1911 New York Times notice previewed a Cork–Kerry match and a Kildare–Kilkenny all-star match at the park, accompanied by music from the Sixty-ninth Regiment band. Celtic Park was also rented to amateur athletic clubs and labor organizations for their own meets. In September 1902, the Grocery Clerks' Union held an athletic competition at the park with handicap dashes, a one-mile run, and a tug-of-war. Following the 1908 American Olympic team's homecoming parade through Manhattan on August 29, 1908, the returning athletes traveled by automobile to Celtic Park to compete in the Firemen's Fund games that same afternoon. The following Labor Day, the IAAC held its annual games at Celtic Park as an "Olympic Games Revival," contested entirely at Olympic distances and featuring what The New York Times described as the first 1,600-meter medley relay ever held in the United States. Professional athletic events were also staged at the park; in April 1913, world professional foot-running champion Willie Kolehmainen won a one-mile race at Celtic Park before finishing second to William N. Queal in the five-mile event before a crowd of about 600 enduring snow flurries.

Clan na Gael, the Irish-American republican fraternal organization, held annual fundraising games at Celtic Park from 1905 through at least 1921; admission fees from these events helped finance Irish nationalist activity in the United States and Ireland. Some events at Celtic Park drew crowds in excess of 15,000.

=== Decline and closure ===
The IAAC suspended formal athletic competition during World War I; club founder P. J. Conway later recalled that the membership had "decided to give up athletics for its duration" and had written to President Woodrow Wilson offering Celtic Park "to the nation for any purpose he saw fit," an offer Wilson thanked the club for and declined. After the war the club struggled financially, and the introduction of Prohibition in 1920 brought regular Sunday arrests of bootleggers at the park, where The New York Times reported a retail trade in pocket-flask whisky among picnickers. On July 23, 1922, a Volstead Act enforcement raid during the twenty-third annual picnic of the International Union of Steam and Operating Engineers, Local No. 20, became a gunfight that wounded four people, including Ruth Curley, an 18-year-old who had arrived in the United States from Ireland about two months earlier and was shot through the abdomen; Queens District Attorney Dana Wallace subsequently announced an investigation into whether the park should be closed as a nuisance.

In 1928, with attendance dwindling, the IAAC leased the field to the New York Greyhound Racing Association. The races drew opposition from the Laurel Hill Improvement Association and the Thomson Hill Taxpayers' Association, whose president George W. Morton Jr. argued in a letter to Queens Borough President Patten that the events would be "a detriment to the community" attracting only "a gambling and 'riff-raff' element," and that the new grandstands violated the neighborhood's residential zoning. A court action initiated by Patten's office delayed the planned September 28 opening; the season eventually began on October 3, 1928, after the racing association's treasurer pleaded guilty to the zoning charge and was given a suspended sentence. The first night debut was punctuated by the arrest of eight men for accepting illegal bets. Greyhound racing continued at the park for fewer than two years before its sale.

On February 22, 1930, the IAAC sold Celtic Park to the City and Suburban Homes Company, the Progressive-era limited-dividend housing developer. The New York Times Real Estate page described the transaction as "one of the biggest real estate transactions reported in some time in Queens" and reported that CSHC had not yet formulated specific development plans, with the company's treasurer characterizing the site as well located for its purposes given proximity to the New York City Subway. The Times subsequently reported the 1930 sale price at about $500,000, against the $9,000 the club had paid for the land in 1897. The sale was negotiated by attorney Daniel F. Cohalan, a former New York Supreme Court justice and Irish-American republican. The IAAC's founder, P. J. Conway, died in January 1932, fewer than two years after the sale.

== Redevelopment and Celtic Park Apartments (1930–present) ==
=== Construction (1930–1938) ===
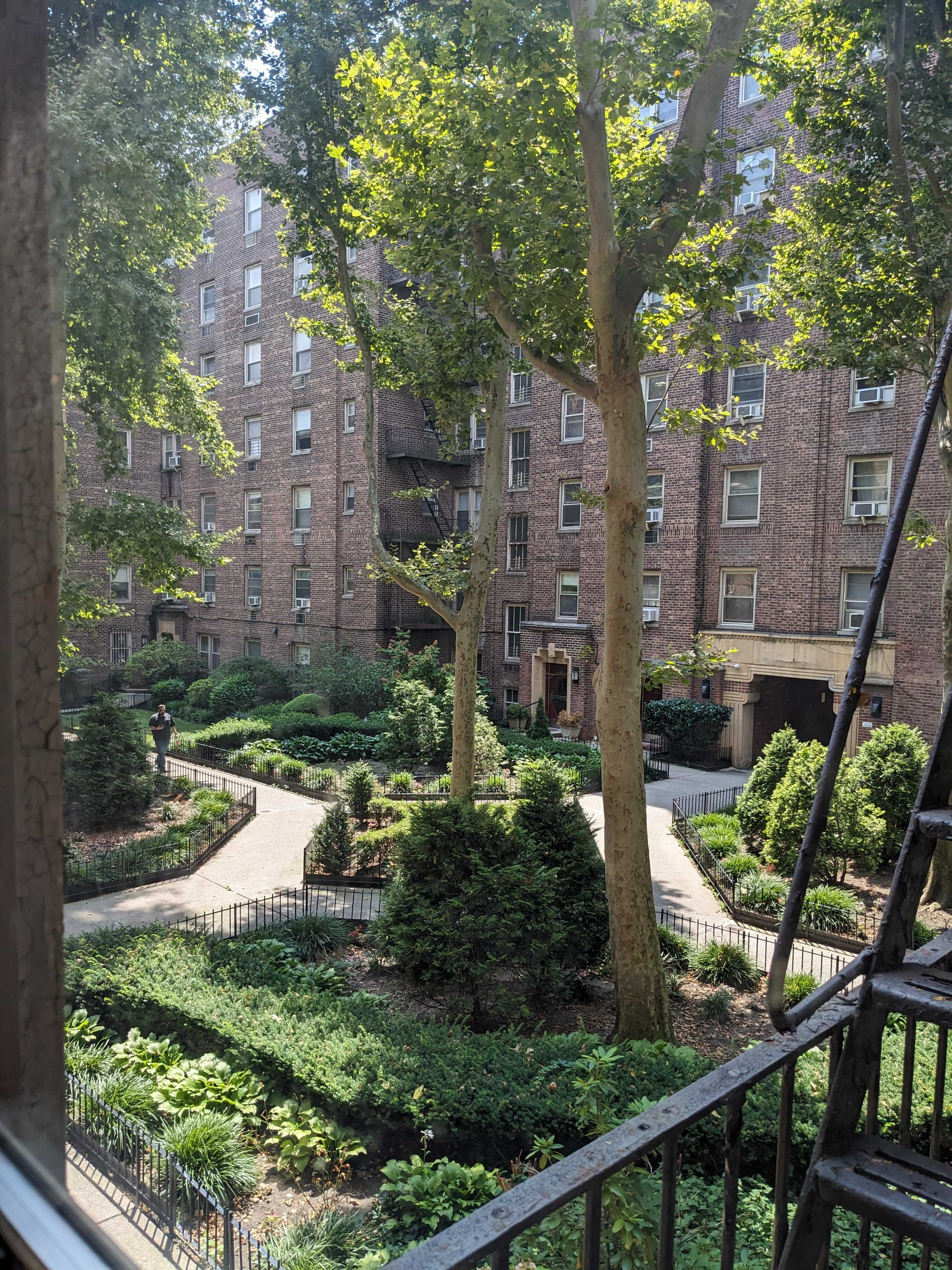
A view of the courtyard of the Celtic Park cooperative apartments in Sunnyside, Queens.

The City and Suburban Homes Company, founded in 1896 as the largest of New York City's privately financed limited-dividend housing companies, began construction on the former athletic field in 1930 and opened the first building, of 117 apartments, to renters in September 1931. (Note: Contemporary New York Times coverage during initial leasing in September–October 1931 reported the first building as containing 116 suites; the 117 figure reflects the post-completion tally reported in 1932.) The New York Times Real Estate page in August 1931 ranked the Celtic Park work among the largest current building operations in Queens, alongside the contemporaneous Phipps Garden Apartments development in Sunnyside Gardens to the north of Skillman Avenue. The first building's general contractor was H. D. Hynds, Inc., whose mechanics were honored by the New York Building Congress at an August 1931 site ceremony addressed by Holmes, Flagg, and Hynds. A 1931 New York Times description of the company's plans noted the intent to provide "modern apartment houses, attractive in design, thoroughly up to date in equipment, spacious in size of rooms and yet within the means of the wage earner in rental." The first block, bounded by 43rd Street, 44th Street, 48th Avenue, and 50th Avenue, measured about 600 by 150 feet (183 by 46 m) and was projected by CSHC's president, Clarence Hoyt Holmes, to hold around 450 apartments at full buildout. Excavation of the second building began on March 7, 1932, and Holmes announced that its 114 apartments, divided into 62 three-room, 40 four-room, and 12 five-room suites totaling 406 rooms, would be ready for occupancy by August 1, 1932. According to the New York City Landmarks Preservation Commission, the first building was designed by Ernest Flagg (1931–32) and the five that followed by Springsteen & Goldhammer (1933–38); the last of the six buildings was completed in 1938. The complex spans 42nd to 44th Streets and 48th to 50th Avenues, straddling the boundary between Sunnyside and Woodside. The modern parcel, which contains 756 units, covers about 9 acres (3.6 ha), an area somewhat larger than the 1897 purchase of about 7 acres (2.8 ha) due to the subsequent vacation of mapped streets that cut through the property.

The development was published in Architectural Record's "Annual Portfolio of Apartments" in March 1932, naming Flagg as architect of the already-built Unit "A" and Springsteen & Goldhammer as architects of the planned Units 1–6, and again in March 1933 with photographs by Samuel H. Gottscho documenting the second Springsteen & Goldhammer building's completion. Architectural historian Mardges Bacon later identified Flagg's Celtic Park building as a direct precedent, in massing and plan, for his subsequent Flagg Court (1932–37) in Bay Ridge. The seven-story brick buildings enclosed three sides of a shared central garden and were further punctuated by open courts facing the streets; architectural historians Robert A. M. Stern, Gregory Gilmartin, and Thomas Mellins later wrote that the "virtually unrelieved brick facades" of the complex produced "a somewhat monotonous overall effect." The City and Suburban Homes Company referred to the complex internally as the "Celtic Garden Apartments," and continued to operate it among its eight remaining properties as of 1950.

The first rentals, advertised in The New York Times in late summer 1931, included four-room flats at $57 to $67 per month and five-room flats at $71.50 to $81.50 per month, and the smallest two-and-a-half-room flats at $40 per month; each unit was equipped with an Electrolux refrigerator and a radio outlet. The second building was served by four full-automatic Westinghouse elevators, with cement-stuccoed stair halls and ivory-painted living rooms and bedrooms. Leasing proceeded quickly: by mid-October 1931, more than 100 of the first building's 117 suites had been rented, most on three-year terms, with applications coming predominantly from salesmen, building-trades craftsmen, municipal employees, and other wage earners. By 1937, the company's annual report identified Celtic Park, alongside its East River and Seventy-eighth Street development in Manhattan, as one of City and Suburban Homes Company's two chief properties.

=== Rental era and cooperative conversion ===
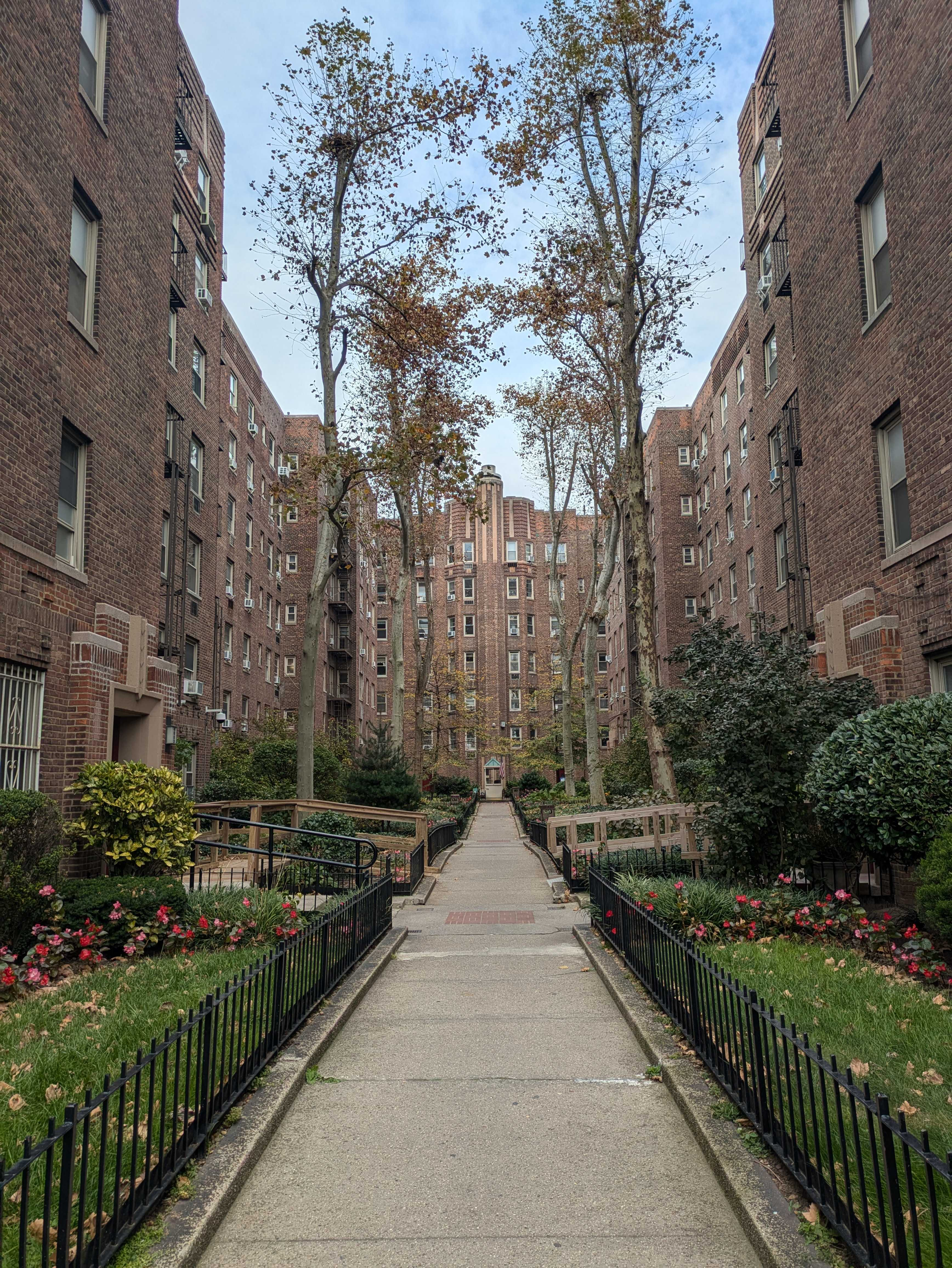
A view of apartments in the Celtic Park cooperative apartment complex from a building courtyard.

During World War II, Celtic Park took part in civil-defense activities; the Long Island City Star-Journal reported in 1942 that residents on the buildings' upper and ground floors were evacuated to middle floors during air-raid drills.

In July 1972, after a 15-percent interim rent increase notice was issued under New York's 1970 Maximum Base Rent law, residents organized the Celtic Park Apartments Tenants Association under the presidency of Joan Dymes; by November 1972 the group had enrolled 450 of the property's roughly 760 households, had secured an appellate court injunction (through the Queens Presidents Council) blocking the interim increases pending a constitutional review, and had negotiated with landlord Norman E. King for roof repairs, basement work, hall painting, and additional overnight security. The association was formally incorporated as a not-for-profit, the Celtic Tenants Association, in February 1973, registered at 48-01 42nd Street immediately adjacent to the complex.

The cooperative housing corporation Celtic Park Owners, Inc., was incorporated in February 1985, and on May 21, 1986, C.B.U. Associates conveyed the property to Celtic Park Owners, Inc., completing the cooperative conversion. As of 2012, the cooperative housed about 2,000 residents in 756 units. The complex's footprint crosses the boundary between the 11104 (Sunnyside) and 11377 (Woodside) ZIP codes, with the dividing line running through the property.

== Legacy ==
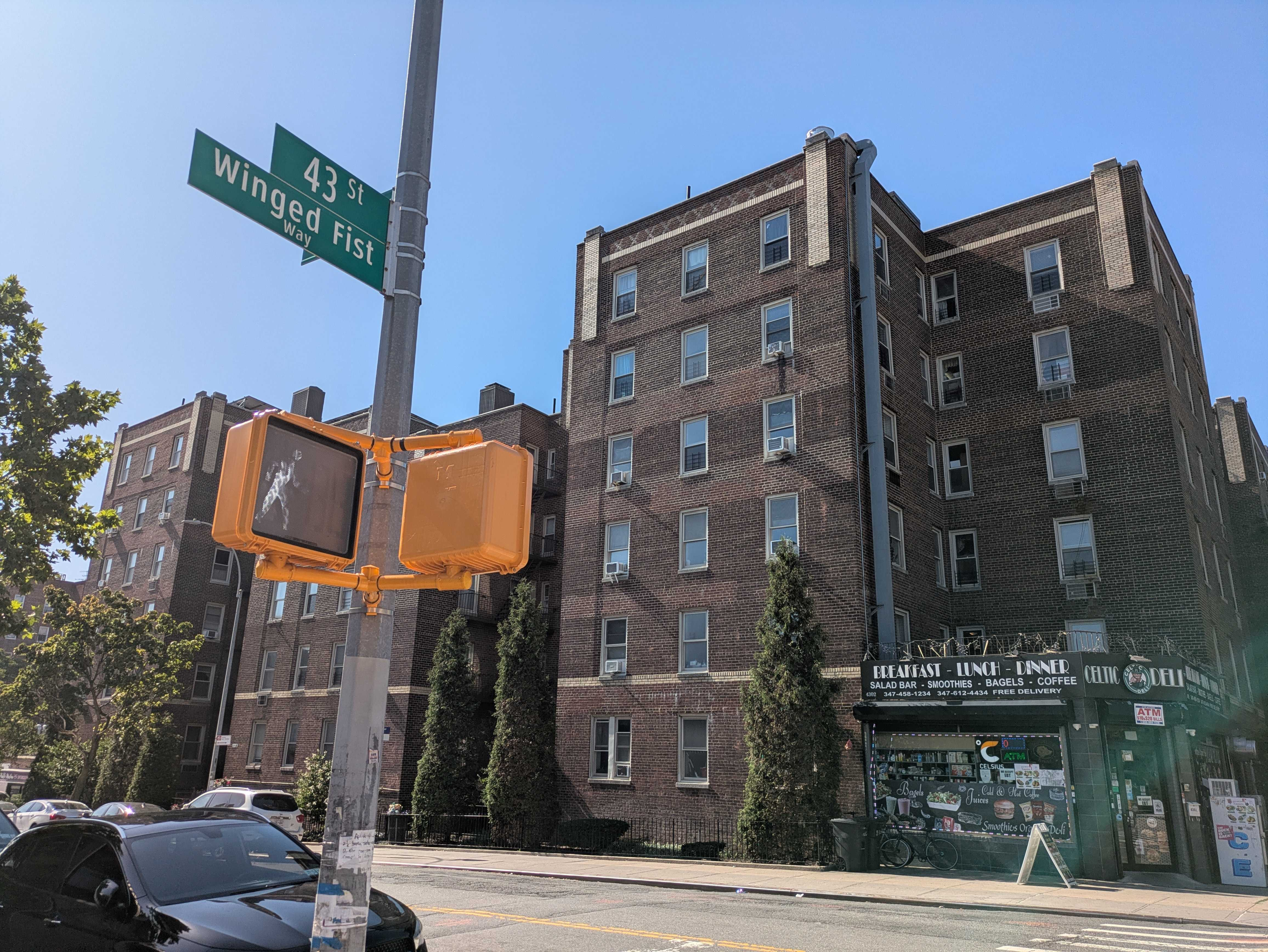
The honorific "Winged Fist Way" sign at 43rd Street, with the Celtic Park Apartments behind

On July 28, 2011, the New York City Council passed a bill sponsored by Council Member Jimmy Van Bramer to co-name 43rd Street between 48th and 50th Avenues, which runs through the apartment complex on the line of the former athletic field, "Winged Fist Way" for the IAAC's emblem. The street sign was unveiled in a public ceremony in March 2012.

A row of attached houses on 48th Street between 50th Avenue and the Queens–Midtown Expressway retains decorative wooden shamrock motifs above their entrances.

== See also ==
- Irish American Athletic Club
- Housing cooperative
- First Avenue Estate, another City and Suburban Homes development
- York Avenue Estate, another City and Suburban Homes development
