= Pat McDonald (shot putter) =

American shot putter

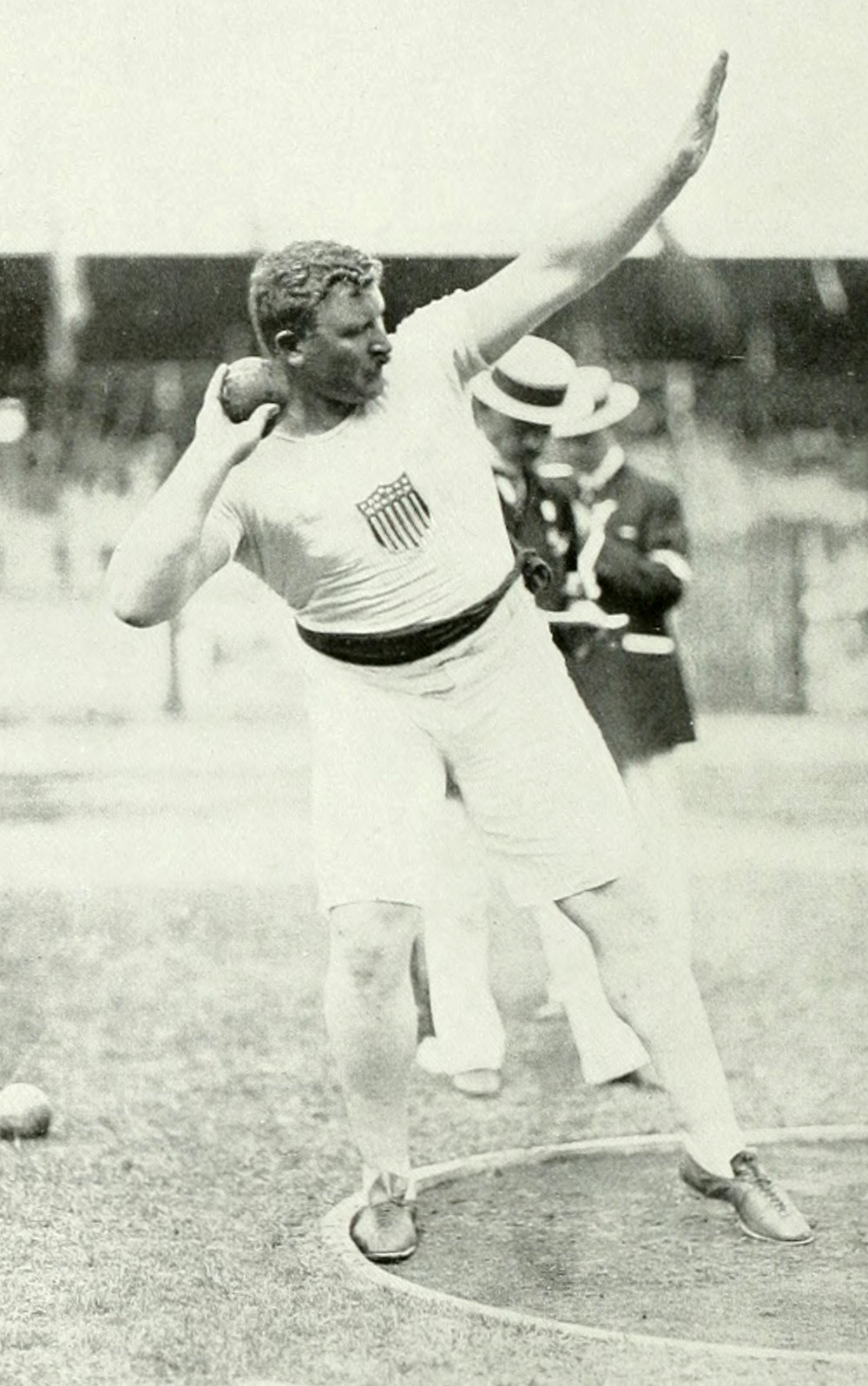
- McDonald in 1912

Personal information
- Nickname: Babe
- Born: July 26, 1878 Killard, County Clare, Ireland
- Died: May 16, 1954 (aged 75) New York, New York, United States
- Height: 6 ft 2.5 in (1.89 m)
- Weight: 265 lb (120 kg)
Medal record
Men's athletics
Representing the United States
Olympic Games
Gold medal – first place	1912 Stockholm	Shot put
Gold medal – first place	1920 Antwerp	56 lb weight throw
Silver medal – second place	1912 Stockholm	Two handed shot put
Tailteann Games
Gold medal – first place	1924 Dublin	56 lb weight throw

Patrick Joseph McDonald (born McDonnell; July 29, 1878 – May 16, 1954) was an Irish-American track and field athlete. He was a member of the Irish American Athletic Club and of the New York City Police Department, working as a traffic cop in Times Square for many years. He was also part of a group of Irish-American athletes known as the "Irish Whales."

== Biography ==
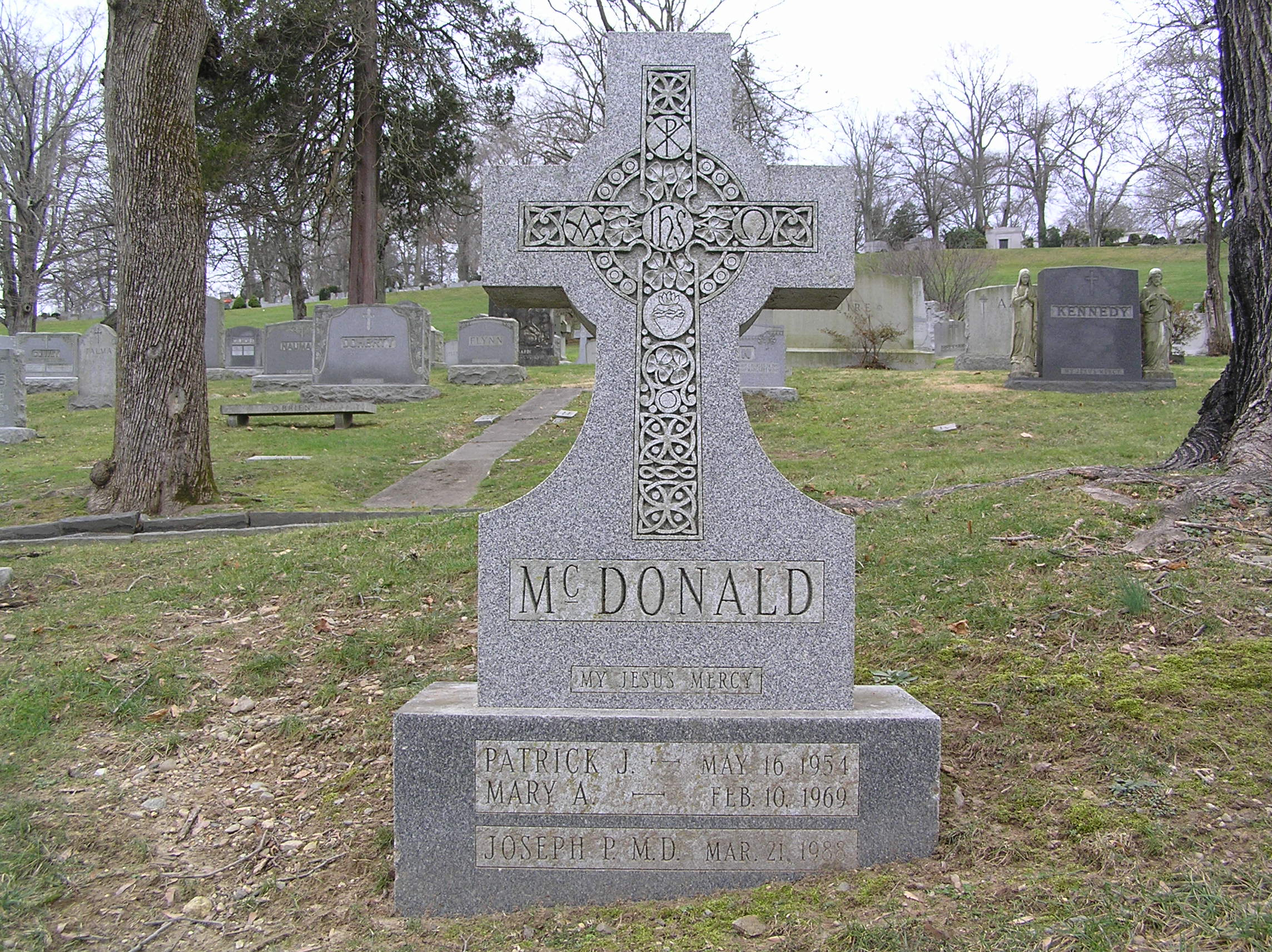
The tombstone of Pat McDonald in Gate of Heaven Cemetery

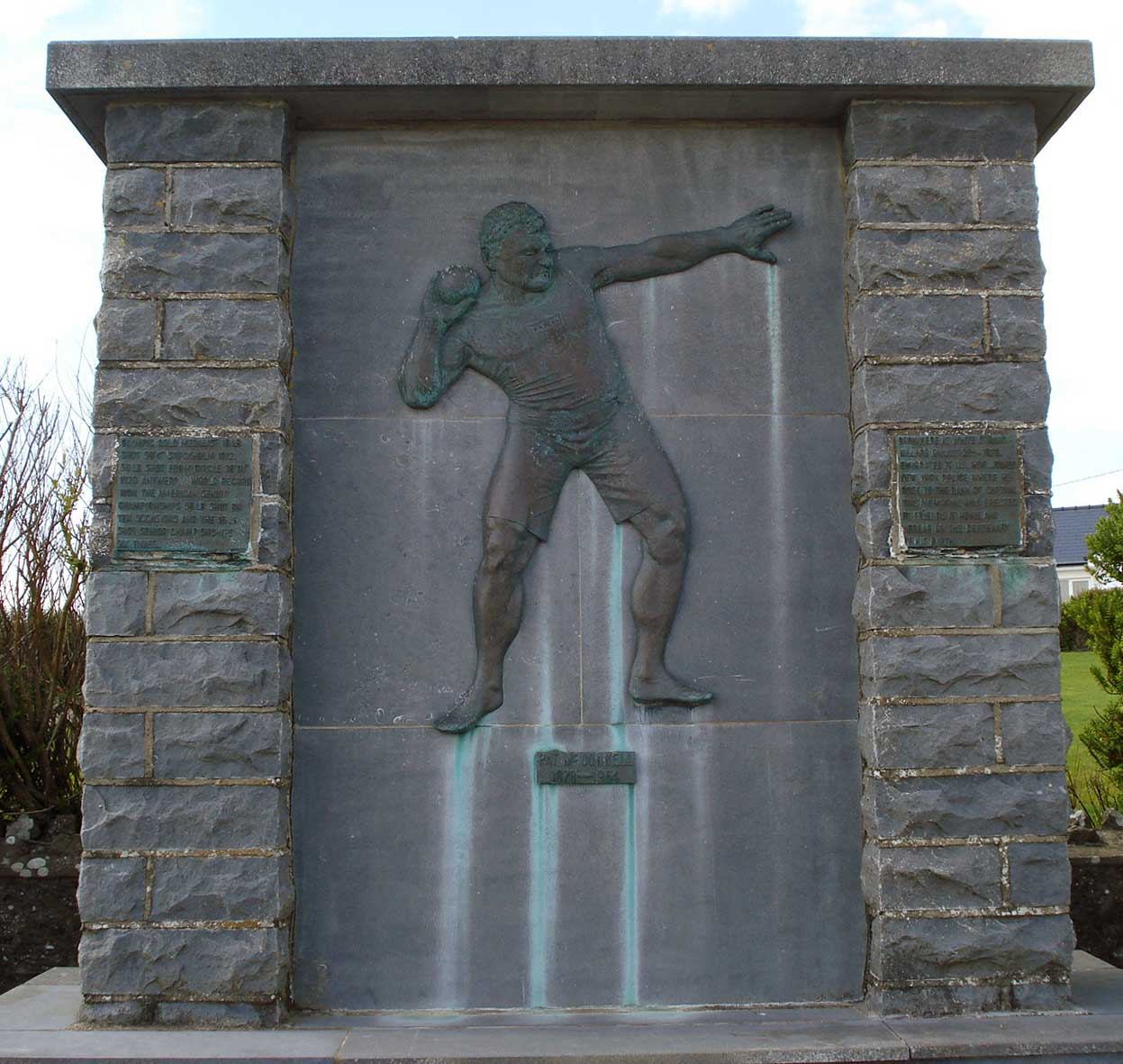
Pat McDonald Memorial at White Strand, Doonbeg, County Clare, Ireland

He competed for the United States in the 1912 Summer Olympics held in Stockholm, Sweden in the shot put where he won the gold medal. He also took part in the shot put (both hands) competition where the distance thrown with each hand was added together. This was the only time this event was held in the Olympic program, and McDonald finished second behind teammate Ralph Rose who had finished second to him in the shot competition.

McDonald returned 8 years later after World War I to compete in the 1920 Summer Olympics in Antwerp, Belgium. Here he won the gold medal in the 56 lb weight throw in the second and final time this competition was held in the Olympic program.

McDonald continued to be a nationally competitive athlete well into his 50s. At the age of 54, McDonald beat his old rival Matt McGrath to win the weight throw for distance at the 1933 USA Outdoor Track and Field Championships. It was his 26th senior national championship meet, and the Omaha World-Herald noted that he had gray hair at the time of his last victory.

Pat McDonald died in 1954 at age 75 and was interred at Gate of Heaven Cemetery in Hawthorne, New York.

He was inducted into the National Track and Field Hall of Fame in 2012.

== See also ==
- Mutiny of the Matoika

== Sources ==
- Greenberg, Stan (1987). Olympic Games: The Records. London: Guinness Books. ISBN 0-85112-896-3.
- Kieran, John (1977). The Story of the Olympic Games; 776 B.C. to 1976. Philadelphia and New York: J.B. Lippincott Company. ISBN 0-397-01168-7.
- Police Athletes of the Past: Patrick Mcdonald - Spring 3100

Olympic Games
Preceded by George Bonhag	Flagbearer for United States; Antwerpen 1920	Succeeded by Taffy Abel
Preceded by Taffy Abel	Flagbearer for United States; Paris 1924	Succeeded by Godfrey Dewey
