= Madison Avenue =

North–south avenue in Manhattan, New York

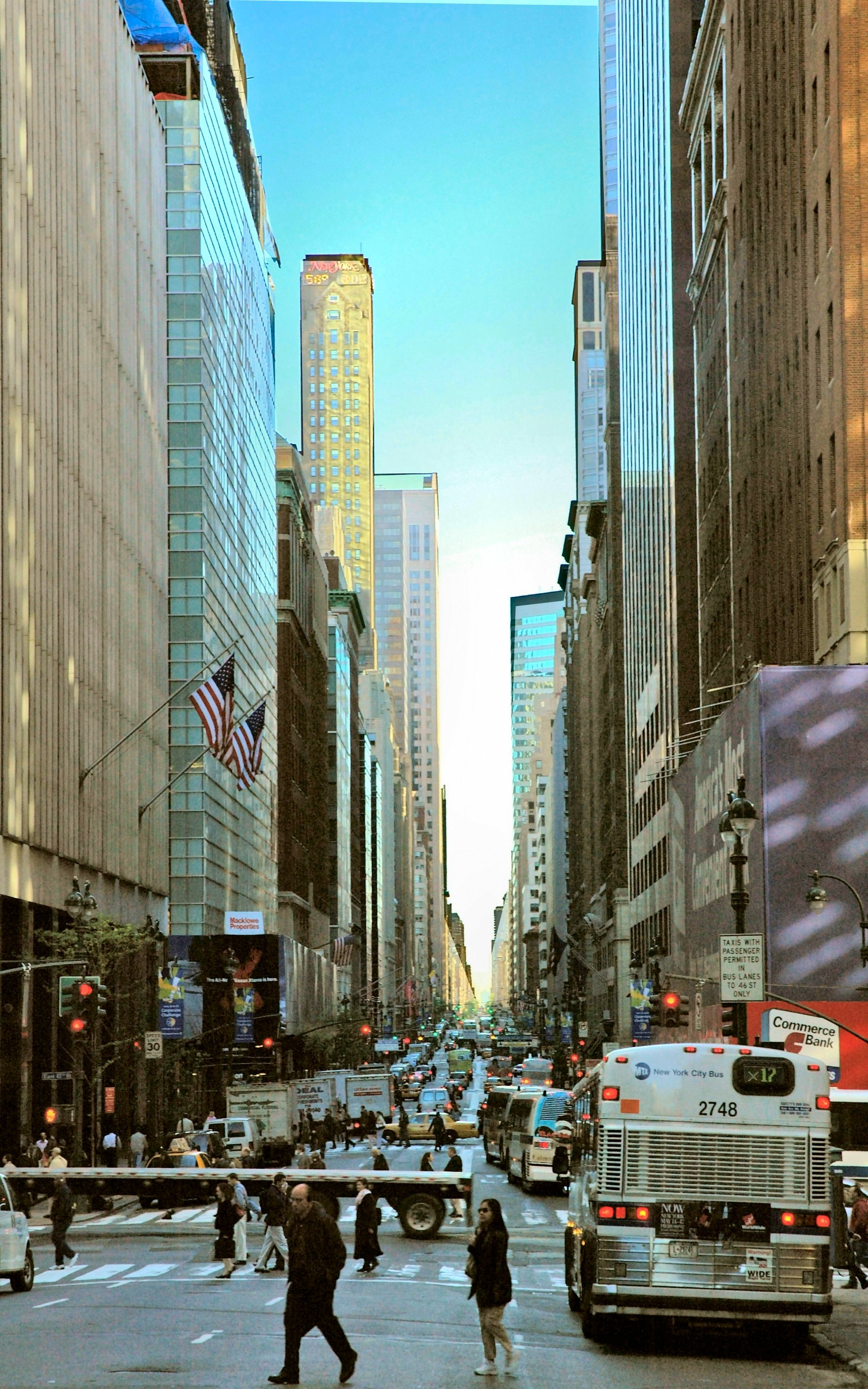
- Looking north from 40th Street seen in 2005
- Interactive map of Madison Avenue
- Namesake: Madison Square, named after James Madison
- Owner: City of New York
- Maintained by: New York City Department of Transportation
- Length: 6.0 mi (9.7 km)
- Location: Manhattan, New York City
- Postal code: 10010, 10016, 10017, 10022, 10065, 10021, 10075, 10028, 10128, 10029, 10035, 10037
- South end: 23rd Street in Flatiron
- Major junctions: Harlem River Drive / Madison Avenue Bridge in East Harlem
- North end: Harlem River Drive / 142nd Street in Harlem
- East: Park Avenue
- West: Fifth Avenue

Construction
- Commissioned: 1836

Madison Avenue is a north–south avenue in the borough of Manhattan in New York City, New York, that carries northbound one-way traffic. It runs from Madison Square (at 23rd Street) to meet the southbound Harlem River Drive at 142nd Street, passing through Midtown, the Upper East Side (including Carnegie Hill), East Harlem, and Harlem. It is named after and arises from Madison Square, which is itself named after James Madison, the fourth president of the United States.

Madison Avenue was not part of the original Manhattan street grid established in the Commissioners' Plan of 1811, and was carved between Park Avenue (formerly Fourth) and Fifth Avenue in 1836, due to the effort of lawyer and real estate developer Samuel B. Ruggles, who had previously purchased and developed New York's Gramercy Park in 1831, and convinced the authorities to create Lexington Avenue and Irving Place between Fourth Avenue (now Park Avenue South) and Third Avenue in order to service it.

The street's name has been metonymous with the American advertising industry since the 1920s. Thus, the term "Madison Avenue" refers specifically to the agencies and methodology of advertising. "Madison Avenue techniques" refers, according to William Safire, to the "gimmicky, slick use of the communications media to play on emotions."

== Route ==
Madison Avenue carries one-way traffic uptown (northbound) from East 23rd Street to East 135th Street, with the changeover from two-way traffic taking place on January 14, 1966, at which time Fifth Avenue was changed to one-way downtown (southbound). This changeover was accelerated by seven weeks due to the transit strike which began on January 1. Between East 135th Street and East 142nd Street, Madison Avenue carries southbound traffic only and runs parallel to the Harlem River Drive.

=== Landmarks ===
There are numerous structures designated as New York City Landmarks (NYCL), National Historic Landmarks (NHL), and National Register of Historic Places (NRHP) on Madison Avenue. From south to north (in increasing address order), they include:

- Metropolitan Life Insurance Company Tower (NYCL, NHL, NRHP)
- Appellate Division Courthouse of New York State (NYCL, NRHP)
- New York Life Building (NYCL, NHL, NRHP)
- Hotel Seville (NYCL)
- Emmet Building (NYCL)
- Colony Club (NYCL, NRHP)
- Madison Belmont Building (NYCL)
- B. Altman and Company Building (NYCL)
- Church of the Incarnation, Episcopal (NYCL, NRHP)
- Morgan Library & Museum (NYCL, NHL, NRHP)
- Joseph Raphael De Lamar House (NYCL, NRHP)
- 275 Madison Avenue (NYCL)
- 400 Madison Avenue (NYCL)
- St. Patrick's Cathedral (NYCL, NHL, NRHP)
- Villard Houses (NYCL, NRHP)
- Look Building (NYCL, NRHP)
- 550 Madison Avenue (NYCL)
- Fuller Building (NYCL)
- 45 East 66th Street (NYCL, NRHP)
- Gertrude Rhinelander Waldo House (NYCL, NRHP)
- 1261 Madison Avenue (NYCL, NRHP)
- 1321 Madison Avenue (NYCL)
- Squadron A Armory (NYCL, NRHP)
- All Saints Church (NYCL)

== Role in advertising industry ==
The term "Madison Avenue" is often used metonymically to stand for the American advertising industry. Madison Avenue became identified with advertising after that sector's explosive growth in this area in the 1920s.

According to "The Emergence of Advertising in America", by the year 1861, there were 20 advertising agencies in New York City, and the New York City Association of Advertising Agencies was founded in 1911, predating the establishment of the American Association of Advertising Agencies by several years.

Among various depictions in popular culture, the portion of the advertising industry which centers on Madison Avenue serves as a backdrop for the AMC television drama Mad Men, which focuses on industry activities during the 1960s.

In the late 20th century many agencies left Madison Avenue, with some moving further downtown and others moving west. The continued presence of large agencies in the city made New York the third-largest job market per capita in the U.S. in 2016, according to a study by marketing recruitment firm MarketPro. Today, several agencies are still located in the old business cluster on Madison Avenue, including StrawberryFrog, TBWA Worldwide, Organic, Inc., and DDB Worldwide. However, the term is still used to describe the agency business as a whole and large, New York–based agencies in particular.

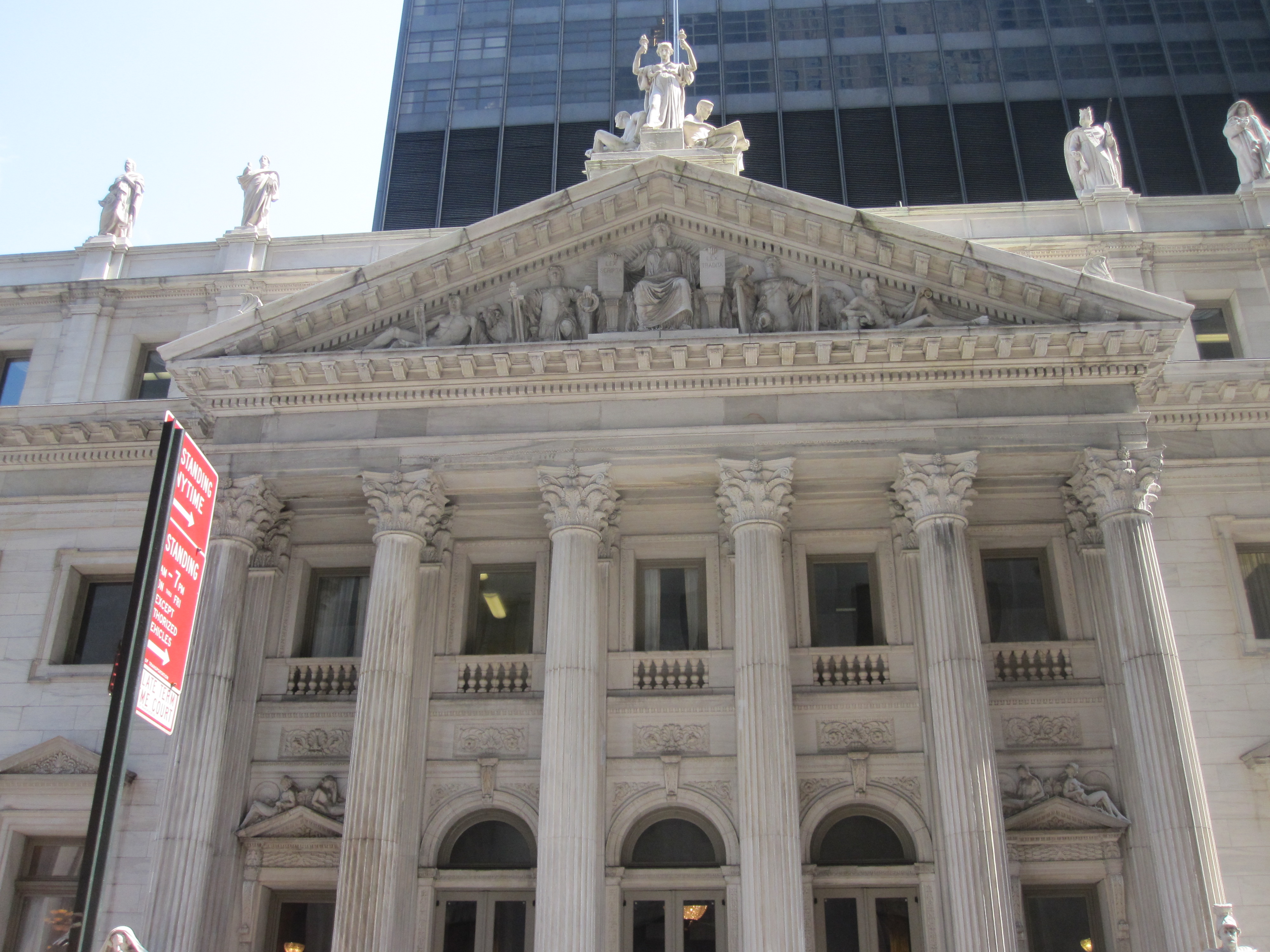
The Beaux-Arts Appellate Division Courthouse of New York State on Madison Avenue, across the street from Madison Square Park

== Madison Square Park and Madison Square Garden ==
Madison Square Park is a 6.2-acre (2.5-hectare) public park which runs along Madison Avenue from East 26th Street to East 23rd Street. It is bordered on the west by Fifth Avenue and Broadway as they cross. The park was named for James Madison, fourth President of the United States.

Madison Square Garden took its name from the location of the first building of that name, located on the northeast corner of Madison Avenue at 26th Street, across from the Park. The first Garden was a former railroad terminal for the Park Avenue main line, which was converted into an open-air circus venue by P. T. Barnum in 1871 and was renamed "Madison Square Garden" in 1879. (The New York Life Insurance Building now occupies that entire city block.) The original Garden was demolished in 1889 and replaced by a new indoor arena designed by Stanford White that opened the following year. The second Garden had a bronze statue of the Roman goddess Diana on the tower of the sports arena. When it moved to a new building at 50th Street and Eighth Avenue in 1925 it kept its old name. Madison Square Garden is now located at Eighth Avenue between 31st and 33rd Street; however, it still retains the name.

== Economy ==
Retail brands with locations on Madison Avenue include:

- Alexander McQueen
- Anne Fontaine
- Baccarat
- Brooks Brothers
- Burberry
- Calvin Klein
- Carolina Herrera
- Cartier
- Céline
- Cesare Attolini
- Chloé
- Christian Louboutin
- Coach
- Damiani
- Davidoff
- Dolce & Gabbana
- Emporio Armani
- Giorgio Armani
- Gucci
- Hermès
- ISAIA
- Jacadi
- Jimmy Choo
- Lanvin
- La Perla
- Mackage
- Manrico Cashmere
- Missoni
- Mulberry
- Oliver Peoples
- Prada
- Proenza Schouler
- Ralph Lauren
- Roberto Cavalli
- Rolex
- Stuart Weitzman
- Tom Ford
- Valentino
- Victoria's Secret
- Vera Wang

and others.

== Transportation ==
=== Transit ===
Madison Avenue is served by the following routes uptown. All crosstown service is eastbound unless specified below. Downtown service runs along 5th Avenue:

- The M1, M2 and M3 local New York City Transit buses are the primary servers, running from East 25th to East 110th Streets, with M1 service extended to East 135th Street.
- The M4 and Q32 join in north of East 32nd Street, running to East 110th and East 59th Streets, respectively.
- From East 65th Street, the M66 and M72 run to East 68th and East 72nd Streets, respectively.
- The M86 SBS runs from East 84th to East 86th Streets.
- From East 96th Street, the M106 runs to East 106th Street, and the westbound M96 runs to East 97th Street.
- The Bx33 runs in both directions north of East 135th Street and crosses the Madison Avenue Bridge.
- Express routes along Madison include the BM1, BM2, BM3, BM4, BM5, BxM3, BxM4, BxM6, BxM7, BxM8, BxM9, BxM10, BxM11, BxM18, QM21, SIM4C, SIM6, SIM8, SIM8X, SIM22, SIM25, SIM26, SIM30, SIM31, SIM33C, X27, X28, X37, X38, QM63, QM64 and QM68 New York City Transit buses and the BxM4C express Bee Line bus.

Although no New York City Subway stations are named after Madison Avenue, the Fifth Avenue/53rd Street station on the E, F, and <F> trains has an entrance on Madison Avenue.

There is a double exclusive bus lane between 42nd and 59th Streets, which comprise the only exclusive bus lane along the avenue. In January 2026, the administration of Mayor Zohran Mamdani announced plans to extend the double bus lane south to the beginning of the avenue at 23rd Street; work on the extension started that April. Pursuant to Section 4-12(m) of the New York City Traffic Rules, driving a vehicle other than a bus on the Madison Avenue bus lanes, with the intent to turn right, is prohibited during the restricted hours specified by signage. Vehicles may turn right at 60th Street, and a taxicab carrying a passenger may use the bus lane to turn right at 46th Street. Bikes are excluded from this prohibition.

=== Overturned midtown bike ban ===
In July 1987, then-New York City Mayor Edward Koch proposed banning bicycling on Fifth, Park and Madison Avenues during weekdays, but many bicyclists protested and had the ban overturned. When the trial was started on Monday, August 24, 1987, for 90 days to ban bicyclists from these three avenues from 31st Street to 59th Street between 10 a.m. and 4 p.m. on weekdays, mopeds would not be banned.
