= First Battery Armory =

Building in Manhattan, New York

- U.S. National Register of Historic Places
- New York State Register of Historic Places
- New York City Landmark
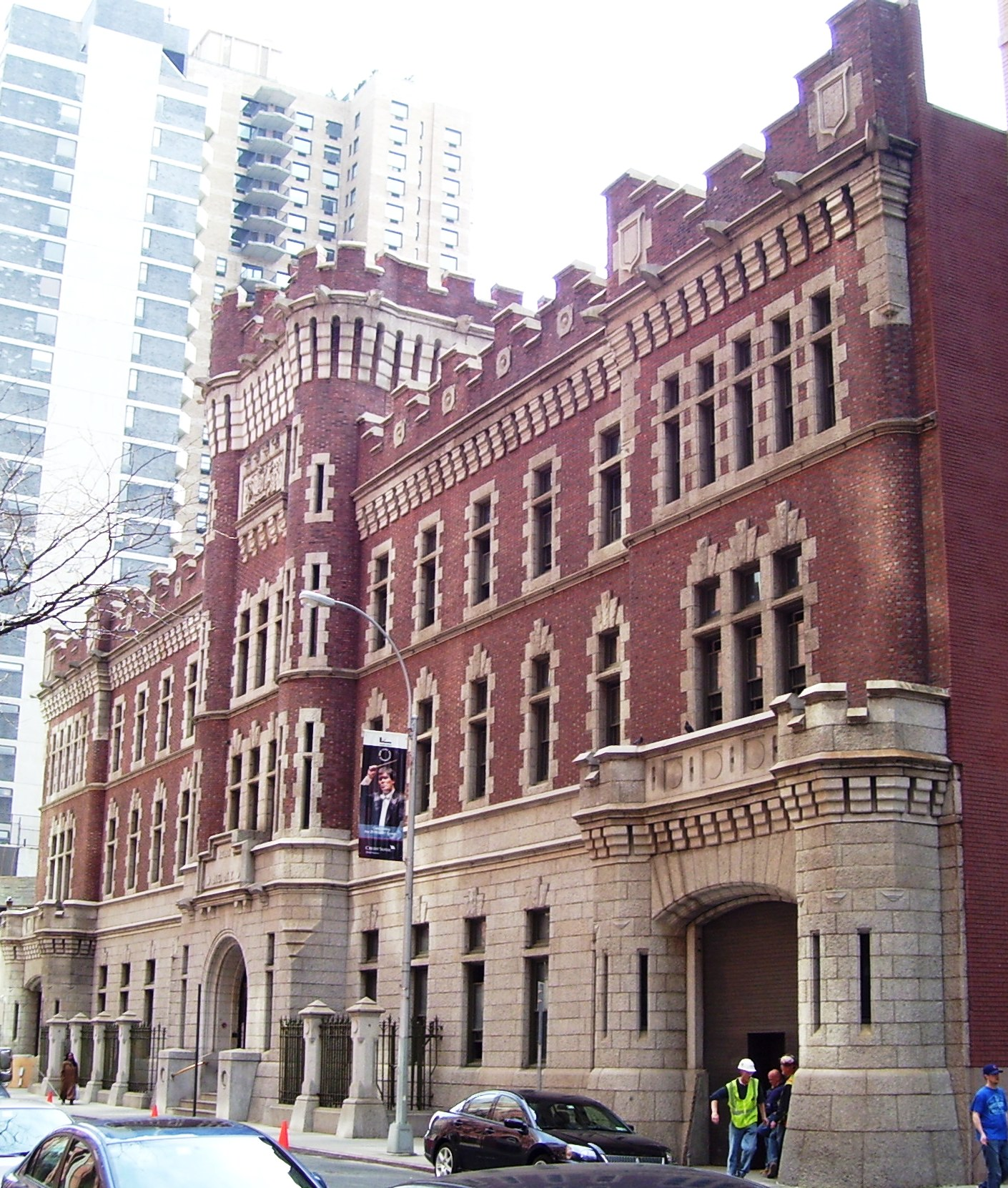
- Location: 56 West 66th Street, Manhattan, New York
- Coordinates: 40°46′23″N 73°58′51″W
- Area: 0.4 acres (0.16 ha)
- Built: 1901–1904
- Architect: Horgan & Slattery
- Architectural style: Late 19th and 20th Century Revivals, Castellated
- MPS: Army National Guard Armories in New York State MPS
- NRHP reference No.: 13000028
- NYSRHP No.: 06101.007349
- NYCL No.: 1670

Significant dates
- Added to NRHP: January 4, 2013
- Designated NYSRHP: December 27, 2012
- Designated NYCL: August 1, 1989

The First Battery Armory (also known as the 102nd Medical Armory and the State Armory) is a historic National Guard armory building at 56 West 66th Street, between Central Park West and Columbus Avenue, on the Upper West Side of Manhattan in New York City, United States. The building was constructed between 1901 and 1904 and was designed by Arthur J. Horgan and Vincent J. Slattery in multiple revival architectural styles. It is composed of a symmetrical brick-and-granite headhouse to the north and a drill hall to the south. The armory is a New York City designated landmark and is listed on the National Register of Historic Places.

The three-story headhouse, measuring 175 by 26 feet (53.3 by 7.9 m), contains a central tower with a penthouse and is flanked by pavilions on its western and eastern ends. The facade of the headhouse, which remains largely intact, is made of granite at the first story and brick with granite trim on the upper stories. The drill hall is a three-story, gable-roofed space measuring approximately 175 by 73 feet (53 by 22 m); it also has a brick facade. The First Battery Armory was initially arranged in a similar manner to other armories, with offices, horse stables, storage rooms, training rooms, and areas where soldiers could socialize. The headhouse housed most of the mechanical rooms and administrative offices, while the drill room was used for training and horse stabling. The interior layout was changed significantly over the years, and almost none of the original interior decorations remain extant.

The New York City government built the armory for the First Battery of the New York National Guard, which had occupied rented space since its founding in 1867. The armory's site was selected in 1896, but construction did not start until May 1901 due to various disagreements. The building was completed in May 1903 and formally opened on February 3, 1904. The First Battery was reorganized multiple times during the late 1900s and early 1910s, and it moved out of the armory by 1917. The First Sanitary Train of the New York National Guard, which became the 102nd Medical Regiment, occupied the armory until 1976 and sometimes rented it out for events. The building was sold at auction to the American Broadcasting Company, which converted the armory to a television studio from 1977 to 1978. After the armory was converted into an office building in 2012, sports television network ESPN, a subsidiary of ABC parent The Walt Disney Company, moved into the armory. Hebrew Union College – Jewish Institute of Religion bought the armory in 2025 and announced plans to renovate it.

== Site ==
The First Battery Armory is at 56 West 66th Street, in the Lincoln Square neighborhood on the Upper West Side of Manhattan in New York City. The building occupies the southern sidewalk of 66th Street between Central Park West to the east and Columbus Avenue to the west. The armory occupies a rectangular land lot of 17,509 sq ft (1,626.6 m^{2}), with a frontage of 174.37 feet (53 m) and a depth of 100.42 feet (31 m). The armory building is adjacent to several apartment buildings, some of which were developed as tenements. Nearby buildings include Manhattan New York Temple to the west, 50 West 66th Street and Congregation Habonim to the east, and the Holy Trinity Lutheran Church and 55 Central Park West to the southeast.

The First Battery Armory is the only building to have been developed on the site. The area was historically a farm, which had been parceled up for development in 1852. Although the Commissioners' Plan of 1811 had created a street grid for Manhattan in the early 19th century, some streets in the area were not laid out until near the end of the century. The construction of Central Park in the 1860s spurred construction on the Upper East Side of Manhattan, but similar development on the Upper West Side was slower to come. Major developments on the West Side were erected after the Ninth Avenue elevated line opened in 1879, providing direct access to Lower Manhattan. By the late 19th century, the block contained five-story brick rowhouses, and St. Nicholas Rink, the first indoor ice rink in New York City, had been built across 66th Street.

== Architecture ==
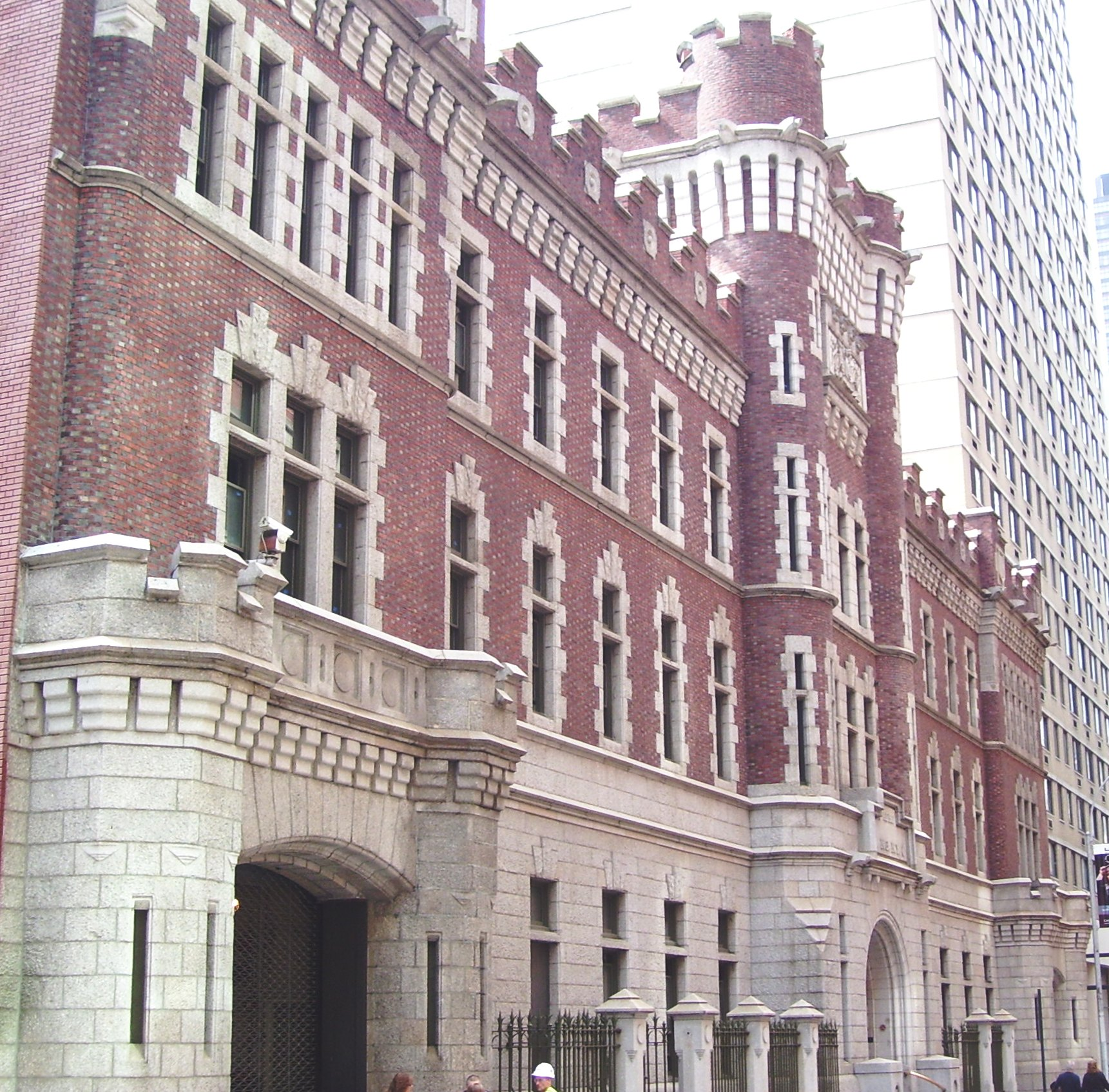
The armory as seen from the east

The First Battery Armory was designed by Arthur J. Horgan and Vincent J. Slattery, who designed numerous buildings for the New York City government, including the Surrogate's Courthouse in Lower Manhattan. The building is three stories tall and is composed of two sections: a symmetrical headhouse to the north, measuring 175 by 26 feet (53.3 by 7.9 m), and a drill hall to the south, a large space spanned by steel trusses. This layout was based on the design of the Seventh Regiment Armory (which in turn had derived its layout from 19th-century train stations) and other early armories designed by the New York Armory Board. The armory is designed in multiple revival architectural styles; according to civic group Landmark West, the armory contains elements of the "Beaux-Arts, Georgian Revival, Medieval Revival, and Romanesque Revival" styles.

The headhouse is composed of a central tower flanked by pavilions on its western and eastern ends. The central tower served as the armory's main entrance and signal tower, while the outer pavilions contained sally ports. The New York City Landmarks Preservation Commission (LPC) described the building's character as reminiscent of 14th- and 15th-century British castles; the "sharpness and character" of the details as being derived from a 15th-century French castle; and the walls and windows as being similar to Georgian revival and 18th-century English design. The drill hall and the facade of the headhouse remain largely intact, but the building's interiors have been significantly modified over the years.

=== Facade ===
The facade contains many castellated architectural elements, including deep openings, turrets, cornices with machicolations, and parapets with crenellations. The facade is clad in granite at ground level, while the upper stories are clad in brick with granite trim. The upper stories contain many elements of late-19th and early-20th-century architectural revival styles, including red and gray brick in Flemish bond, as well as granite window surrounds with classical details. According to the LPC, the design includes many details inspired by "medieval castles and Parisian boulevards". The facade was originally planned with red-brick stretchers and blue-brick headers, which would have formed a checkerboard pattern. Although the building was patterned after old fortifications, only some design elements, such as the granite base, central tower, and recessed areaways on 66th Street, served a defensive purpose. Other elements, including the windows, crenellations, and cornice, were included for aesthetic reasons.

The headhouse and its penthouse contain a narrow flat roof, while the drill hall is topped by a wider gable roof. The penthouse's roof originally contained an iron-and-glass skylight, while the drill hall originally contained 12 skylights. Half of the drill hall's skylights were removed in 1936, when the headhouse and penthouse roofs were resurfaced in asphalt and the drill hall roof was resurfaced with a mineral mixture. The penthouse's skylight was removed in 1960 when the roof was replaced with three-ply wood. The roof was replaced again in 1977, when mechanical equipment was installed atop both sections of the building, and the drill hall's roof was replaced with asphalt shingles in 1998. As of 2011, the headhouse's roof contains HVAC equipment, emergency generators, a boiler flue, and stair bulkheads, while an elevator shaft and cooling tower are placed atop the penthouse.

==== 66th Street elevation ====
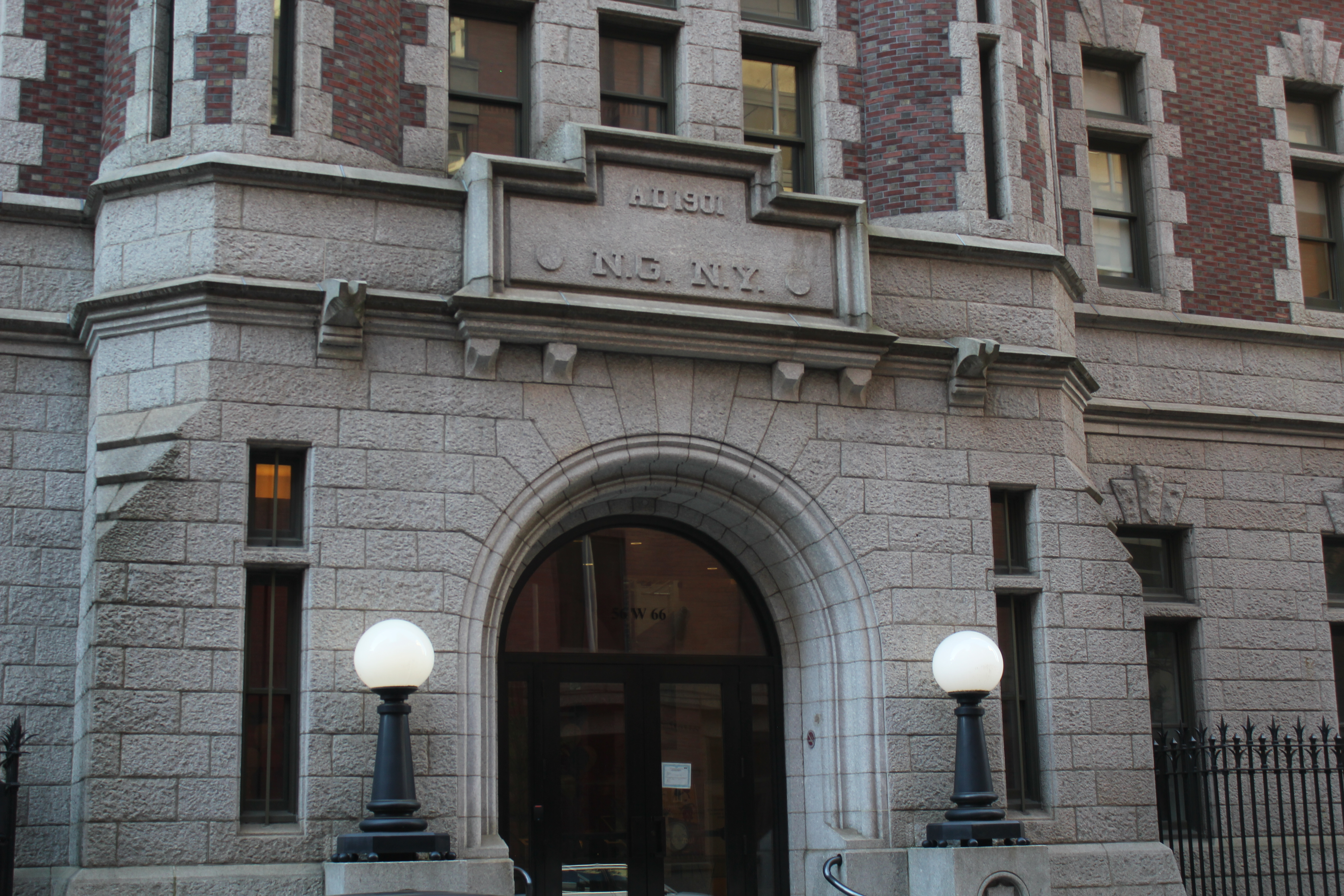
Main entrance to the First Battery Armory

On 66th Street, the central tower contains a wide granite round arch at the first story, accessed by a small granite stoop with a metal handrail. The round arch originally contained a bronze-clad door; this was replaced in 1977 with aluminum-and-glass doors, then in 2011 by bronze-and-hardwood doors, topped by a transom window and flanked by sidelights. The stoop is flanked by granite pedestals topped by cast iron spherical lamps; the lamps were replaced by granite caps in the 1970s and restored in 2011. The central tower contains two stone panels with inscriptions. Directly above the entrance is a panel with the initialism "A.D. 1901 / N.G. N.Y.", referencing the year when the building's construction started and the New York National Guard. Atop the tower is a panel with the insignia of the First Battery, which consists of a shield with the year 1901, the initials N.G. N.Y., and the Latin motto semper paratus. The shield is flanked by motifs of cannons and militiamen tending cannonballs, and it is topped by motifs representing helmets, crossed axes, and flags.

The primary portions of the facade on 66th Street, between the central tower and outer pavilions, are placed behind an areaway with an iron fence and granite posts. The areaways and fence originally stretched across the entire distance between the central tower and outer pavilions. Part of the areaway to the west (right) of the main entrance was slabbed over in 1977, when the New York City government added a streetlamp. The areaway to the east (left) is covered by a wheelchair-accessible ramp, which leads to a doorway immediately east of the main entrance. The upper stories largely contained one-over-one sash windows with wood frames, inset within granite surrounds; these were replaced with aluminum replicas in 2004.

Segmental arches in each of the outer pavilions provide additional entrances to the building. The east pavilion originally contained a wooden garage door, leading to a horse stable in the basement and a riding path in the drill hall; the doors were replaced at least three times, and the doorway includes a pair of wooden double doors as of 2011. The west pavilion contains a granite base and recessed metal door, which was installed in 2011 and is a replica of the original door there. The door in the western pavilion, as well as three windows directly above it, were replaced with a fire exit in 1977. The central tower and the outer pavilions contain 24 loophole windows, some of which have been replaced over the years.

==== Other elevations ====
The eastern and western elevations of the facade originally were clad in common brick and contained window openings. These elevations were later covered with stucco, which was scored to give the appearance of red brick. Both elevations are topped by red stucco parapets, behind which are mechanical equipment and bulkheads. Part of the western elevation can be seen from behind an apartment building, which is directly adjacent to the armory. This elevation contains a small exterior light court, which originally had 12 wooden sash windows, as well as another window illuminating the cellar. The gable near the top of the western elevation contained an oculus, with a leaded-glass window that depicted a hexagram. All of these windows have since been removed. The light court contains a ground-level doorway leading to the drill hall's basement, as well as a metal boiler flue on its northern wall.

The eastern elevation contains several louvers, behind which are mechanical equipment. There is a slight setback about halfway up the center of the facade, which creates a small light court. There is a ladder on the south side of the setback and a stair and service door on the north side. Behind the setback, the eastern wall was originally divided vertically into three bays, each with three wooden sash windows, as well as an oculus with a hexagram near the top of the facade. The northern and southern sides of this light court contained one sash window each. All of these windows were infilled in 1977, when the louvers were installed.

The southern elevation is visible only at the third story and penthouse levels. The penthouse has a brick facade and an elevator shaft. The southern elevation of the headhouse is made of brick and is not visible from the street, but it has skylights, aluminum windows, and metal doorways which were all added in 2011. The headhouse also had 12 sash windows on the third story and two sash windows at the penthouse level; these windows were replaced in 1948 and infilled or replaced with louvers in 1977. The facade of the drill hall's southern elevation is made of red brick and contained nine bays of three windows each, which were infilled in 1977 with concrete masonry units (CMUs) and brick.

=== Interior ===
The First Battery Armory was initially arranged in a similar manner to other armories, with offices, horse stables, storage rooms, training rooms, and areas where soldiers could socialize. The headhouse had a basement, three stories, and a penthouse; it housed most of the mechanical rooms and administrative offices. The drill room consisted of a double-height space for training and a cellar for horse stabling. The superstructure was intended to be fireproof and included brick walls, cast-iron columns, reinforced concrete floor slabs, and steel girders. Described in The New York Times as "one of the finest [armories] in the city", these spaces may have been ornately decorated, although the original layouts and decorations of the armory are not known. The ceilings of the first headhouse floor were originally 17 feet (5.2 m) high, while those of the second and third headhouse floors were generally 13 feet (4.0 m) high.

The First Battery Armory was renovated least four times: in 1936, before 1968, in 1977, and in 2011. Acoustic-tile dropped ceilings were installed on all three stories in 1968, and some window and door openings were infilled with plywood above the level of the dropped ceiling. After the American Broadcasting Company (ABC) took over in 1977, the headhouse's first and second floors contained offices and administrative areas, while the third floor and penthouse contained mechanical equipment. Most of the interior has been divided into offices, but the drill hall's steel trusses and south wall are still visible. The drill hall has two stories of offices, which are connected to the headhouse by overpasses; due to zoning restrictions, there is a 30-foot (9.1 m) gap between the southern wall of the drill hall and the office stories. By the 21st century, the basement under the headhouse contained mechanical rooms, while the basement under the drill hall contained offices.

==== Basement ====
The basement contained a horse stable with 64 stalls, a gun lift, a shooting range, a storeroom for armor and ammunition, a harness room, bathrooms, and mechanical equipment. The headhouse's basement contained bathrooms, horse feed rooms, and ammunition rooms to the east of a central stair hall, as well as harness room and mechanical equipment to the west of this hall. At some point between 1913 and 1936, the ammunition room was converted to a dispensary, and the horse-feed rooms became a pump room. A women's locker room and restroom was added within the dispensary around 1936. ABC renovated the basement further in 1977, converting the women's lockers and bathroom to chiller room; adding service and generator rooms west of the stair hall; and adding an electric service room within part of the stair hall.

The drill hall's basement originally included a stable with six box stalls and 58 tie stalls; the space included cast iron columns that supported a concrete ceiling. The basement's northeast corner contained a ramp to the drill hall's first-floor riding ring. A load-bearing wall separated the stables from a shooting range at the south end of the basement, which was 12 feet (3.7 m) wide. The stables had been partitioned into offices by 1948, and storerooms were added in 1962. ABC gutted the basement in 1977 and added dressing rooms, dressing studios, and storage rooms. These spaces had vinyl-tile floors, acoustic-tile ceilings, and concrete-and-gypsum-board walls, although some of the original iron columns and plaster ceilings were retained. As of 2011, the basement includes offices, locker rooms, and a pantry. These are connected by corridors with raised concrete-tile floors, iron columns, and arched plaster ceilings; there are four "common areas" that open up to the first floor. The offices themselves are decorated with materials such as carpeted floor tiles, gypsum-board partitions, and acoustic-tile ceilings.

==== First headhouse story ====
The first headhouse story originally contained administrative offices, officers' rooms and meeting spaces. The main entrance led directly into the central stair hall, which contained mosaic tiles and marble wainscoting. The stair hall was flanked by the board room, officers' room, reception room, and surgeon's office to the west, as well as the first sergeant's and quartermaster's offices, supply room, and sally port to the east. In 1936, several of the rooms to the east of the stair hall were divided, while the rooms to the west retained their original layout and were repurposed. (Note: The rooms east of the lobby were modified as follows: The first sergeant's office and first sergeant's private room were combined into a recruiting office.; The quartermaster's supply room was divided into a hallway and a first sergeant's office, and the doorway to the drill hall was sealed.; The quartermaster's office and quartermaster's private room were combined into an armorer's office.; The rooms to the west of the lobby were converted into other offices: The reception room became an office.; The captain's room continued to serve as such, but a women's bathroom was installed.; The surgeon's office became a conference room.; The officers' room was turned into colonels' quarters.) Further changes to the layout were made in 1938, when a partition were removed, and in 1956, when an elevator was removed. The rooms east of the lobby were again divided before 1968, while those to the west of the lobby were repurposed. (Note: The rooms east of the lobby were modified: The recruiting office became a switchboard room and superintendents' office.; The first sergeant's room was turned into the battalion office, and a door to the drill hall and a stair to the second floor was installed.; The armorer's office was converted into the battalion headquarters office, and a door to the drill hall was installed.; The rooms to the west of the lobby were converted into other offices: The offices next to the lobby became an adjutant's office and general boardroom.; The meeting room became an executive office.; The colonels' quarters was turned into the OICC Office.) During the building's 1977 renovation, the existing decorations were gutted, and ABC added carpet-tile floors, acoustic-tile ceilings, and concrete-and-gypsum-board walls. The stair hall was replaced with a reception area, and a new stair and drill-hall entrance were built to the south. The rooms flanking the lobby were also removed; the sally port ramp was removed; some windows and doorways were sealed; and emergency-exit stairs were installed.

By 2011, the reception area had gypsum-board walls, stone floors, and acoustic-tile ceilings. A west–east corridor on the north side of the first floor had raised concrete-tiled floors. The corridor was flanked by offices with carpeted floor tiles, movable glass-and-metal partitions, and acoustic-tile ceilings. There was a utility room at the east end of the west–east corridor, a bike storage room at the west end, and emergency-exit stairways at the northwestern and northeastern corners.

==== Second headhouse story ====
The second headhouse story contained utilitarian areas, namely a recreation room, kitchen, locker rooms, and non-commissioned officers' rooms. There was a non-commissioned officers' room, bathrooms, and locker rooms east of the stair hall, as well as a mixed-purpose recreation room, kitchen, and pantry to the west. Initially, there were about 150 lockers. The non-commissioned officers' room became a second locker room in 1936 but was turned back into an office before 1968. In addition, the original locker room was subdivided, and the mixed-purpose room was turned into a day and class room before 1968. Offices and a conference room were installed on the second headhouse story during the 1977 renovation. At the same time, a west–east corridor was built on the south end of the second floor, and a partition wall was added to the south, separating the second headhouse story from the drill hall.

The modern layout of the second story dates to 2011; it is decorated in largely the same style as the first-story corridor and offices. On the south side of the second floor, there are several openings and four stairs leading to the drill hall.

==== Third headhouse story and penthouse ====
The third headhouse story was devoted to a general's room, meeting room, and captain's apartments. Formal rooms such as general's, clerk's, and board rooms occupied the eastern half of this story, while utilitarian spaces such as janitor's, captain's, and storage rooms occupied the western half. The penthouse contained storage rooms. During a 1936 renovation, the boardroom became a smaller storage room; the clerk's and general's rooms became locker rooms; and a space at the far east end became two storage rooms. Additionally, the janitor's and captain's rooms respectively became the first sergeant's and quartermaster's office, and the western storage room became a locker room with a toilet. Prior to 1968, the locker and storage rooms on the third floor became classrooms and offices, while the quartermaster's office became a supply room. During the 1977 renovation, the third headhouse story was demolished and rebuilt as a mechanical story with a concrete floor, steel-deck ceiling, and brick walls. In addition, a spiral staircase leading to the penthouse was replaced with a central stair, and the penthouse became mechanical space.

By 2011, the third story and penthouse had been renovated again with conference rooms, offices, and other spaces. The third headhouse story contained offices, a bathroom, storage rooms, and a west–east corridor on its south end. These spaces were largely decorated in the same style as the first- and second-story corridors and offices. A stair led between the third story and the penthouse, where there was a conference room with a raised concrete-tiled floor, gypsum-board ceiling, and brick walls.

==== Drill hall ====
The drill hall is a three-story space measuring approximately 175 by 73 feet (53 by 22 m). Unlike the headhouse and basement, the drill hall remained largely unchanged from the armory's opening until 1977. The center of the floor originally contained a riding rink made of tanbark, which was surrounded by a scored-cement floor. The sally port was at one corner of the floor, while a runway to the basement was in another corner. The drill hall's walls were made of buff-colored brick with yellow pine kneeboards and red-brick substrate; the lower part of the wall was wainscoted in cream-colored brick. Decorative metal brackets on the walls supported a balcony with about 426 seats. There were wood-trimmed doors and windows within the walls; lighting sconces mounted onto the piers of the wall; large openings that led north to the headhouse. The ceiling contained large steel trusses that supported a beadboard ceiling; the trusses contained electric lights.

When the drill hall was converted to a television studio in 1977, ABC replaced the floor with a concrete slab, removed the gallery, created lighting-control and scenic-art rooms on the east side of the hall, and added two levels of storage space above these rooms. ABC also added a CMU partition on the north wall to conceal some of the openings on that wall, which had been sealed off, and it removed the kneeboards from the walls. ABC sealed some of the windows with CMUs, installed catwalks and acoustic panels on the ceiling, and moved the freight elevator from the northwest to the southwest corner.

In 2011, two levels of offices and conference rooms were added above the original drill hall's floor. The first story contained cubicles, conference rooms, a pantry, and a bathroom. Four openings were carved into the first-story floor slab, illuminating the basement's "common areas"; the two openings to the south contained exposed steel beams. The second and third floors contaiedn more offices and are set back 30 feet from the south wall; these floors were connected with the headhouse's stairs to the north. The drill hall is finished in the same materials on all stories, with either carpet-tile or concrete tile floors, glass or gypsum-board walls, glass-and-metal partitions, and acoustic-tile or gypsum-board ceilings. (Note: On each story, the offices and conference rooms contained carpet-tile floors, while hallways and service rooms contain concrete-tile floors. The offices used gypsum-board walls, and the conference rooms had glass walls; both spaces had glass-and-metal partitions. There were dropped ceilings in each office and gypsum-board ceilings in the hallways.) The windows on the south wall have been restored; the wall also contains a metal band, which conceals "scars" that were created when the spectators' balcony was removed. The ceiling retains its original ceiling trusses and contains white perforated metal panels, which replaced the deteriorated beadboard planks.

== History ==
Battery K of the First Regiment of Artillery was organized in April 1867 and, in its early years, was composed primarily of German-Americans. Battery K became a standalone unit in 1869 after the First Regiment of Artillery was disbanded, and it was reorganized as the First Battery in 1881. The First Battery's first known headquarters was at 334–346 West 44th Street, where it shared space with a saloon. The 44th Street building was nicknamed Wendel's Assembly Rooms after the First Battery's captain, Louis Wendel, who was closely connected to the Tammany Hall political ring. Under Wendel's leadership, the battery served in active duty during the Orange Riots in 1871, the Great Railroad Strike of 1877, and a Brooklyn streetcar operators' strike in 1895. Wendel first requested that the New York state government provide funding for a dedicated armory building in 1884, but no action was taken on that proposal.

=== Development ===
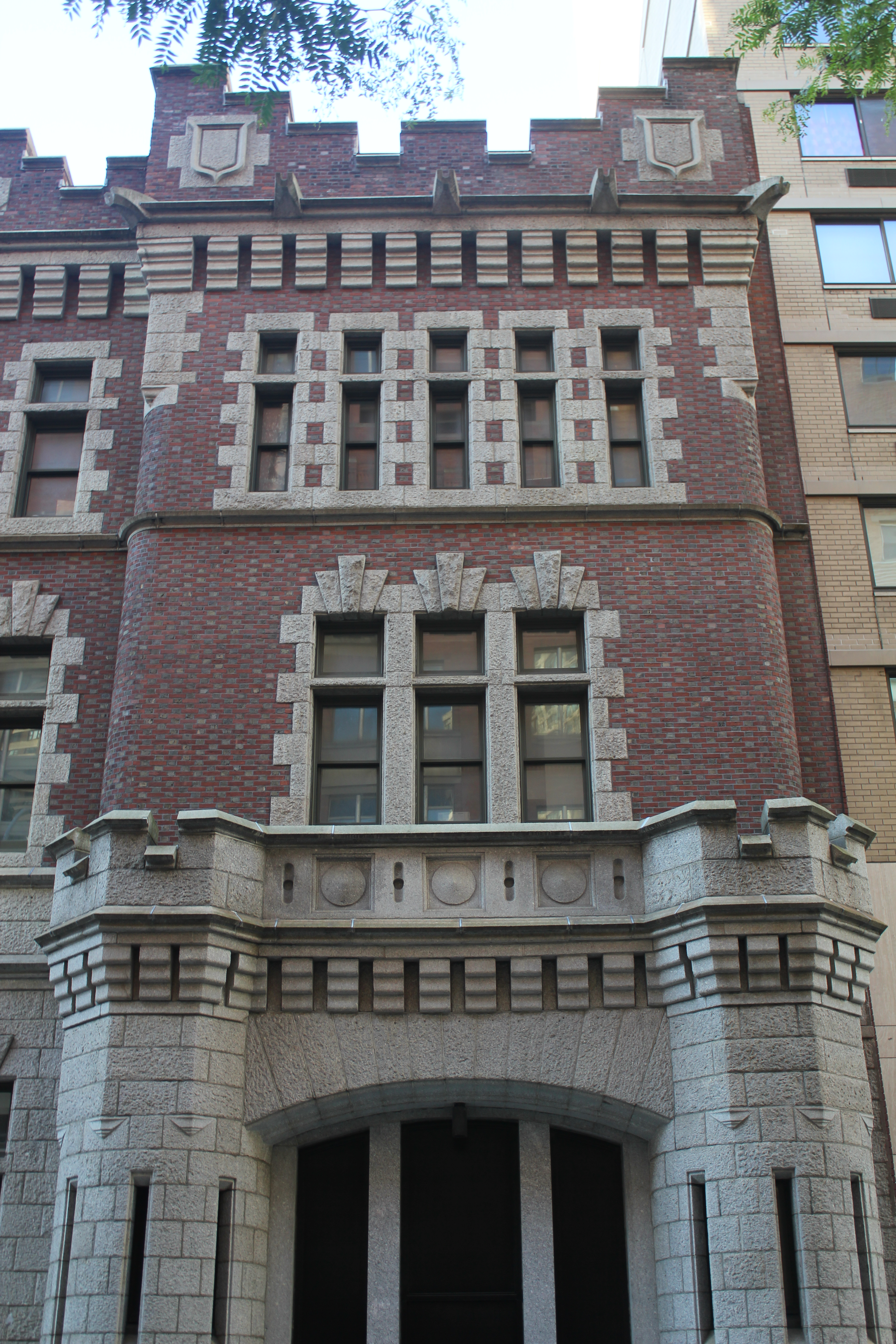
The First Battery Armory's western pavilion

New York's Armory Board began studying several potential armory sites in the mid-1890s. On March 31, 1896, the Armory Board selected a site on the south side of 66th Street, near Columbus Avenue, as the site of a new armory for the First Battery. A survey of the site was submitted to the Armory Board that June. The Armory Board's commissioners, composed of mayor Robert Anderson Van Wyck, two of his appointees, and two of the New York National Guard's appointees, next had to hire an architect. Van Wyck and his appointees selected Horgan & Slattery as the architect in November 1899. Both of the commissioners appointed by the National Guard had objected to the plans. One of the National Guard appointees, First Brigade commander McCoskry Butt, had wanted the board to be selected via a competitive bidding process, but Van Wyck replied that his commissioner of buildings should have complete discretion in choosing the architect. Butt also wanted the armory to include space for his unit, but this did not occur, as his successor relocated to the 71st Regiment Armory after Butt resigned during construction.

Meanwhile, the site's existing owners and tenants had claimed that the city's Commissioners of Appraisal had undervalued their property, but the New York Supreme Court approved the appraisals in late 1899. The New York City mayor's office approved an $115,681 award for the existing owners in January 1900. The next month, the Armory Board accepted the plans for the armory. At the time, the building was to occupy seven land lots and cost no more than $200,000. The city's board of sinking fund commissioners approved $200,000 in bonds to fund the construction of the First Battery Armory in August 1900. After the city approved the drawings the same month, Horgan and Slattery submitted plans for a three-story brick-and-granite armory to the New York City Department of Buildings in October 1900. In response to a comment criticizing the delays, Horgan and Slattery said they had created 17 pages of blueprints and 250 pages of specifications in six weeks. By then, Wendel had expressed dissatisfaction with the delays.

The Armory Board began soliciting bids for the new armory's construction in February 1901, at which point the building was to cost $120,000 and was to be completed within 250 workdays. The board received six bids for granite work and plumbing. Luke A. Burke was hired as the main contractor, having submitted a low bid of $170,000, while Michael J. O'Brien was hired to furnish the plumbing. Construction of the armory commenced on May 23, 1901. The cornerstone for the First Battery Armory was laid on September 21, 1901, when 125 members of the battery marched from their previous armory on 44th Street. Because of delays in the construction of the First Battery Armory, the unit renewed its lease for its previous building on 44th Street in 1902. Local news sources reported in April 1903 that there were difficulties in completing the armory, which was supposed to have been finished two years previously, and that the Armory Board had written "letter after letter" to the contractor. Although the general contractors had completed the armory in May 1903, it remained unused for nine months.

=== Military usage ===
==== First Battery and successors ====
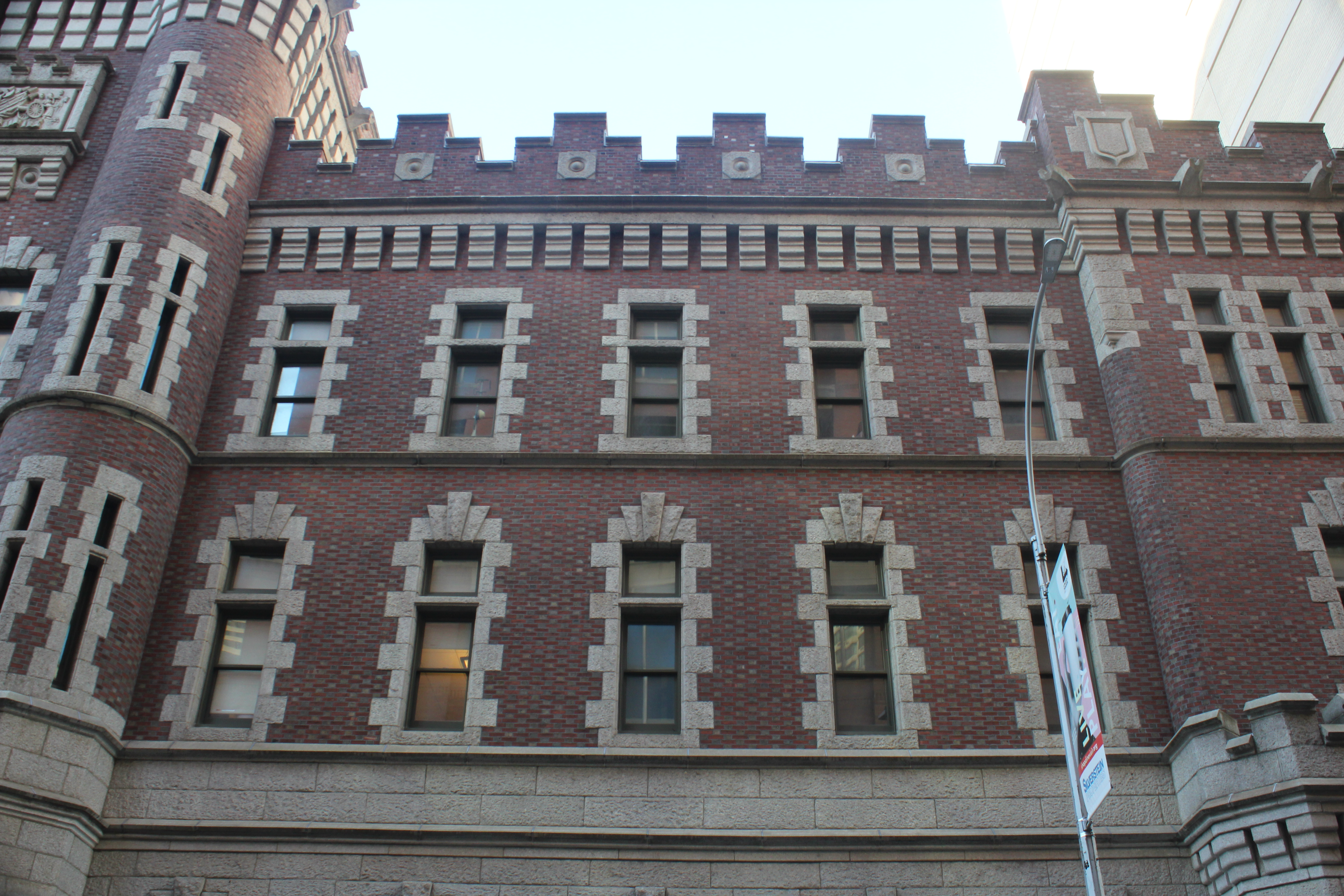
View of the windows on the western part of the facade

The First Battery Armory opened on February 3, 1904, with a ceremony attended by mayor George B. McClellan Jr. The armory had cost about $320,000 to construct, including $116,339.58 for the site, $194,064.84 for the armory itself, and $9,249.65 for furniture. In the years after the armory was completed, the National Guard was placed under the control of the United States Army, which continued to operate the armory. Wendel became involved in a bribery and embezzlement scandal in December 1906, after civilian employees accused him of extortion. He resigned in January 1907, and Major John F. O'Ryan took over as the First Battery's commander. In 1908, the First Battery merged with the Second Battery in the Bronx and the Third Battery in Brooklyn to form the First Battalion of Field Artillery. The battery thus became the First Battery of the First Battalion of Field Artillery. The battalion initially trained at the Second Battery Armory in Brooklyn but had moved to the Bronx by 1910.

New York's governor decided in September 1911 that the First Battery would become a battalion, tripling its strength from 131 to 393 men. The First Battery was mustered out, and men and equipment were reassigned to the newly created Batteries D, E, and F of the Second Battalion of Field Artillery. Each battery originally had 40 to 45 men, who trained at the 66th Street armory. New York's field artillery was divided into two regiments in January 1913; the First Regiment of the First Field Artillery, was headquartered at 56 West 66th Street. Battery B, part of the First Battalion of the First Regiment, was established at the 66th Street Armory in May 1913. The same year, the Armory Board decided to relocate the First Battalion to the 22nd Regiment Armory on Broadway between 67th and 68th Streets, in part because the battalion could no longer fit into the armory. The First Battalion was dissolved in 1917, and the First Battery became the 104th Field Artillery.

==== 102nd Medical Regiment ====
The First Sanitary Train of the New York National Guard (later the First Field Ambulance Corps) moved into the First Battery Armory after the First Battalion had relocated. The First Field Ambulance Corps served during the Pancho Villa Expedition and World War I. By 1917, the building was known as the First Field Hospital Armory. That December, during World War I, the First Field Hospital Armory was converted into a field hospital. The armory also hosted events such as a bazaar in 1917, and it began hosting boxing matches in 1919 after a professional-boxing ban in New York City was lifted. The New York National Guard was once again rearranged in April 1921, upon which the sanitary units of the New York National Guard were to be headquartered at the First Field Hospital Armory. At this time, the 104th Field Artillery became the 102nd Medical Regiment. Over the years, the building served less of a defensive purpose; the turrets and horse stables became storage space, and terrazzo tiles depicting the 102nd's insignia were installed on the floor of the main lobby.

The U.S. federal government gave a $6 million grant to the New York City government in late 1935 through the Works Progress Administration (WPA). The grant involved $67,500 for renovations to the 102nd Medical Armory. The armory was extensively renovated in 1936 as part of a WPA project. With the onset of World War II, in 1940, the New York state government stopped renting out the armory for civilian events, and the 102nd Medical Regiment was mustered into service. During the war, the city government transferred the armory to the state government, which continued to operate the armory for three decades. After World War II, the 102nd Medical Armory hosted events such as Open Exhibition of Colorful Tropical Birds and Canary Types and motor-vehicle inspections. By the 1950s, the building was known as the State Armory. The headhouse underwent gradual renovations between 1936 and 1968, when various rooms were rearranged. Workers added dropped ceilings within the headhouse in 1968.

In June 1975, the state's budget director recommended closing the First Battery Armory and another armory in Brooklyn, and reducing the number of staff at twelve other armories across the state, to save $376,900 per year. The following January, the 102nd moved out of the armory, and the drill room was converted to a tennis court. The tennis court was managed by the Lincoln Plaza Racquet Club, whose operator Jason H. Smith Jr. paid $1,000 per month in rent. The second and third floors housed the Double Image Theatre, a community cultural center. The New York City Board of Estimate voted to buy the First Battery Armory from the state government in March 1976 for $1. The city then placed the armory for auction.

=== ABC ownership ===
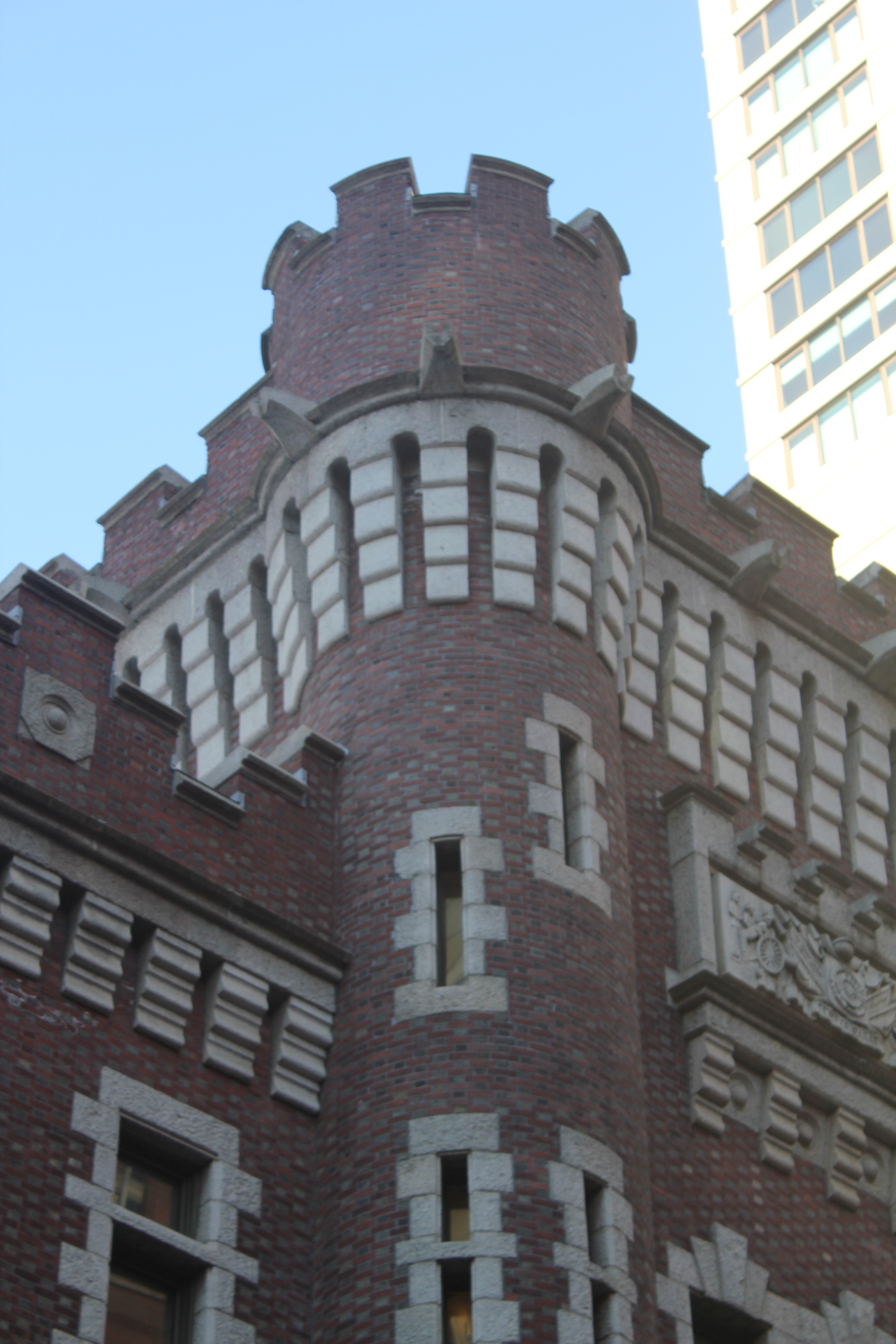
The top of the central tower

ABC acquired the First Battery Armory for US$800,000 (equivalent to $4,526,320 in 2025) at an auction in June 1976, with plans to convert the armory to offices. The armory was one of several buildings in the Lincoln Square neighborhood that ABC had acquired. ABC estimated that the armory's renovation would cost $3 million and create 44 long-term jobs; the proposed renovation was part of ABC's $50 million plan to construct production facilities around Manhattan. ABC began restoring the building in February 1977 to designs by Kohn Pedersen Fox (KPF), which was hired after A. Eugene Kohn, one of KPF's principal architects, read a newspaper article about ABC's purchase of the armory. This was the first of numerous projects that KPF designed for ABC and its future parent company, the Walt Disney Company. The work included steam-cleaning the facade, soundproofing the interior, and adding a new ceiling under the drill hall's roof. The project also involved removing almost all the old finishes, relocating partitions, painting the side elevations of the facade, and modifying the front entrance. The city government's Industrial and Commercial Incentives Board approved a tax abatement for the armory's renovation in April 1977.

The renovation was completed in January 1978 at a cost of $8 million. ABC began using the armory as a production studio for ABC Daytime programs, in particular the soap opera One Life to Live, one of two full-length ABC Daytime shows. ABC announced in 1986 that it would relocate most of its New York City offices from Midtown Manhattan to Lincoln Square, creating a headquarters "campus" around 66th, 67th, and 68th Streets. At the time, the armory was still being used as a production studio, while the buildings across 66th Street housed ABC's news and engineering departments. The New York City Landmarks Preservation Commission designated the building as a New York City landmark on August 1, 1989, after ABC supported the designation. By the 1990s, fans of One Life to Live frequently congregated around the armory during tapings, hoping to meet the show's cast members.

The television studio was demolished in 2012 and converted to office space. In addition, the Graciano Corporation restored the facade to its original appearance over a five-month period. The armory was placed on the National Register of Historic Places in 2013 as part of the Army National Guard Armories in New York State multiple-property submission. Disney sold most of its Upper West Side campus in 2018 to Silverstein Properties but retained ownership of the First Battery Armory. By then, the armory housed the offices of sports channel ESPN, a Disney subsidiary.

=== Hebrew Union College ownership ===
By 2023, Disney wanted to sell the armory, having relocated to Hudson Square, Manhattan. Hebrew Union College – Jewish Institute of Religion announced plans in February 2025 to purchase and occupy the building after selling their Greenwich Village building to New York University. HUC finalized its sale that month and hired Beyer Blinder Belle that July to renovate the building with classrooms, a library, and gathering and prayer spaces.

== See also ==
- List of armories and arsenals in New York City and surrounding counties
- List of New York City Designated Landmarks in Manhattan from 59th to 110th Streets
- National Register of Historic Places listings in Manhattan from 59th to 110th Streets
