= 28th Police Precinct Station =

Building in Manhattan, New York

- 28th Police Precinct Station House
- U.S. National Register of Historic Places
- New York State Register of Historic Places
- New York City Landmark
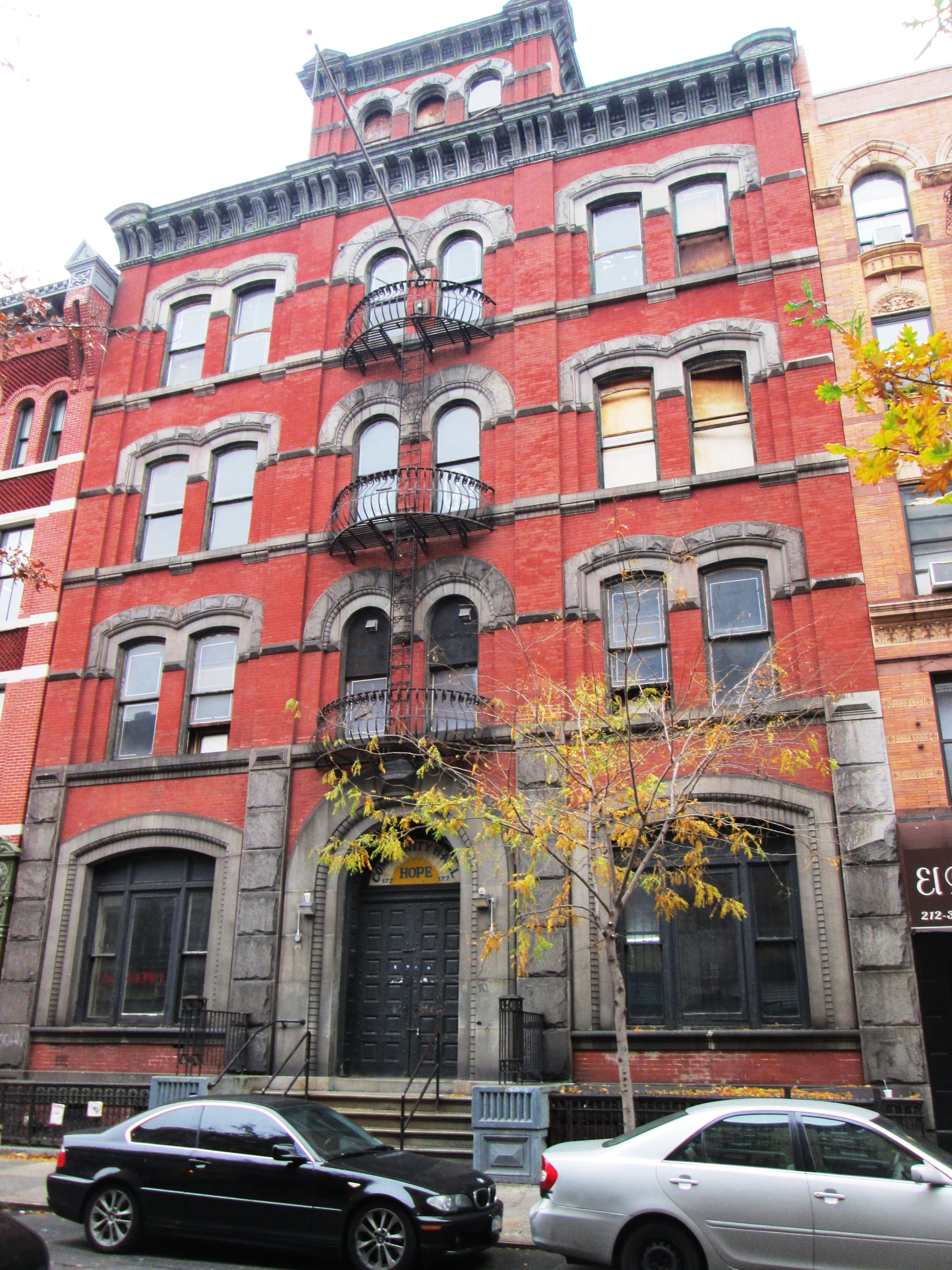

- Location within Manhattan Location within New York City Location within New York Location within the United States
- Location: 177 East 104th Street, New York, New York
- Coordinates: 40.7905°N 73.9462°W
- Area: 0.12 acres (0.049 ha)
- Architect: Nathaniel D. Bush
- Architectural style: Rundbogenstil, Renaissance Revival, Neo-Grec
- NRHP reference No.: 100010988
- NYSRHP No.: 06101.022033
- NYCL No.: 2034

Significant dates
- Added to NRHP: 2024-11-18
- Designated NYSRHP: 2024-09-12
- Designated NYCL: 1999-02-23

The 28th Police Precinct Station is a former New York City Police Department (NYPD) police station at 177–179 East 104th Street in the East Harlem neighborhood of Manhattan, New York City, United States. Built between 1892 and 1893, it served the 28th (later 23rd) Precinct of the NYPD until 1974. It was designed by Nathaniel D. Bush in the Rundbogenstil, Renaissance Revival, and Neo-Grec styles as one of ten NYPD station houses he designed in Manhattan. Since 1981 it has been owned by the Hope Community Hall of Hope Community Inc, a non-profit housing organization.

The building has a symmetrical five-story red brick facade with granite decorations, divided into a tall central bay and two shorter bays flanking it. Inside, there were originally public-facing staff offices on the ground floor, and dormitories and sergeants' offices on the upper stories. There is also a two-story rear annex, which was once used as a jail and a homeless shelter. The building is listed on the National Register of Historic Places and is preserved by the New York City Landmarks Preservation Commission as an individual city landmark.

== Description ==
The former 28th Precinct Station House is located at 177–179 East 104th Street in the East Harlem neighborhood of Manhattan, New York City, United States. It was designed by Nathaniel D. Bush in the Rundbogenstil, Renaissance Revival, and Neo-Grec styles. It was one of ten NYPD station houses he designed in Manhattan and is stylistically similar to the early skyscrapers built in New York City in the 1880s. Nearby are the Park Avenue Viaduct to the west, Carver Houses to the south, Gaylord White Houses to the east, and St. Cecilia Church and Convent to the north.

The New York Times described the building as "the best one in the city" when built, with a five-story facade and a jail in the rear. The fifth edition of the AIA Guide to New York City called the 28th Police Precinct Station, along with the neighboring Engine Company 53 Firehouse and the Church of the Living Hope, a "curious trio" of older buildings.

=== Facade ===
The building has a symmetrical five-story red brick facade with grey granite trim, along with horizontal granite courses at the heights of the lintels and windowsills. There is also an exposed basement, which is set behind an areaway at the base, with a decorative iron fence; this area is accessed by a stair that is covered by a steel mesh hatch. The facade is divided vertically into three bays. Only the central bay rises the whole five stories, while the outer bays are four stories each.

At basement level, there is an entrance with two windows on either side. The first story of the facade's main (southern) elevation is taller than the others, with a recessed central entrance under a round arch made of granite. The entrance is accessed via a granite stoop and has a double door with transom windows above. Flanking the entrance, at the first story, are segmentally arched windows which are themselves flanked by granite piers. The second through fourth floors share a repeating pattern of round-arched windows in the central bay and segmentally-arched windows in the outer bays. These openings contain wooden sash windows. The central bay has a wrought-iron fire escape and a flagpole. Above the fourth and fifth stories are decorative sheet metal cornices with Doric motifs. The fifth story contains three arched windows on each elevation of the central bay.

The rear (north) elevation of the facade rises five stories with an exposed cellar. It has paired wood windows, a courtyard door, and a brick chimney. Dating from the 1890s is a three-story brick jail behind the main building. The jail is composed of a cellar and two above-ground levels, all clad in brick and sandstone, with granite courses leading horizontally across the facade. The cellar and first story have arched windows, while the second story has an overpass leading back to the main building; the annex's north elevation has rectangular windows. The main building and annex have similar flat roofs.

=== Interior ===
The interior generally has decorations such as hardwood floors, plaster walls with paneling, pressed metal ceilings, and medallions and cove moldings on the ceilings. There is a pair of light courts on either side of the building, which allow natural light to illuminate the rooms inside. On the western periphery of the building is a wooden staircase descending to the basement and ascending to the upper stories. This stair, the only link between the floors, retains details such as a newel, a curving handrail, pressed-metal undersides, and wood wainscoting. Footbridges on the first and second stories lead north to the annex in the rear; the annex has no stairs or other vertical circulation elements directly connecting its first and second floors.

On the main building's first floor, the main entrance leads to a vestibule to the front office; there is a captain's room to the west and a sergeant's room on the east. Behind the stair and front office is another sergeant's room to the west, as well as a sitting room occupying the entire rear frontage; the sitting room also has a passageway leading back to the annex. The two first-floor sergeants' rooms are located beneath the light courts. The main building's cellar has brick partitions with utilitarian design details, including brick walls, pressed metal ceilings, and concrete floors. The cellar also had a shooting range. Within the annex, there is a jail on the first floor and in the cellar. The annex's cellar also has utilitarian decorations and is divided into three rooms.

Additional, non-public offices are located on the upper stories, which were used as dormitories and offices. The second, third, and fourth floors share similar layouts flanked by patrolmen's dormitories at the north and south ends. Each floor has a central circulation core containing the stairwell, corridors, restrooms, and sergeant's rooms. The original decorations are similar to those on the first floor, but these stories also contain carpeted and vinyl-tile floors, gypsum-board walls, and dropped ceilings from later renovations. The smaller fifth floor has a gymnasium in front and a dormitory in the rear, separated by a central core. The annex's second floor was once used as a homeless shelter.

== History ==
Prior to the 28th Precinct's establishment, the New York City Police Department's (NYPD) neighboring 27th and 29th precincts had patrolled the southern portion of East Harlem. The opening of the Second Avenue and Third Avenue elevated lines spurred development in East Harlem, and tenement housing was built for the area's immigrant residents. The NYPD began planning for a new precinct in 1890. After identifying a site on 104th Street near the New York City Fire Department's (FDNY) Engine Company 53 firehouse, the NYPD bought two sites there in 1892. That April, Nathaniel Bush filed plans for a five-story precinct house and two-story rear annex, costing $60,000 in total. Work began that May and took thirteen months.

The 28th Police Precinct Station opened on July 1, 1893, serving the portion of East Harlem between 96th and 116th streets. The NYPD hired 46 police officers to staff the new precinct and adjacent ones in Upper Manhattan. The NYPD used the rear annex as a homeless shelter until 1896, after which the department no longer operated homeless shelters. The precinct was renumbered four times in the next four decades. It became the 29th when the City of Greater New York was established in 1898; the precinct then became the 39th in 1908, the 13th in 1924, and finally the 23rd in 1929. The precinct house was sometimes used as a protest location in the mid-20th century, as in the 1960s, when community members gathered there to protest police brutality against local Black and Puerto Rican residents. The 23rd Precinct established a youth council at the precinct house in 1961, and it had hired community members to deal with non-emergency matters by the late 1960s.

The station house was used until 1974, when a new station house for Engine Company 53 and the 23rd Precinct opened on 102nd Street. Since 1981 it has been the Hope Community Hall of Hope Community Inc, a non-profit housing organization. The New York City Landmarks Preservation Commission (LPC) proposed designating the building as a city landmark in 1991, along with other Harlem buildings. The building was vacated from 1993 onward because, with its singular staircase, it did not meet modern fire safety codes. The LPC designated the building as a landmark on February 23, 1999, and the old station house was also added to the National Register of Historic Places on November 18, 2024. The Centro Journal, writing in 2025, said that the 28th Precinct Station and other designated landmarks in East Harlem "highlight and emphasize the architectural and aesthetic values over the sociohistorical layers present in many of these properties".

== See also ==
- List of New York City Designated Landmarks in Manhattan from 59th to 110th Streets
- National Register of Historic Places listings in Manhattan from 59th to 110th Streets

== Sources ==
- 28th Police Precinct Station House (Now Hope Community Hall) (PDF) (Report). New York City Landmarks Preservation Commission. February 23, 1999.
- 28th Police Precinct Station House (Report). National Register of Historic Places, National Park Service. November 18, 2024. Report hosted on cris.parks.ny.gov (On "Search" tab: Criteria → Lookup → National Register number: 24NR00064 → NR Nomination Form).
