= American Broadcasting Company =

American broadcast television network

- Type: Television network
- Country: United States
- Broadcast area: United States and Bermuda, reaching bordering regions via overspill of their terrestrial networks
- Affiliates: List
- Headquarters: Walt Disney Studios, Burbank, California, U.S. (TV production); Manhattan, New York City, U.S. (broadcasting)

Programming
- Language: English
- Picture format: 720p HDTV (Note: Downscaled to 480i for the SDTV feed.); upscaled 1080i or 1080p via ATSC 3.0 in some markets

Ownership
- Owner: The Walt Disney Company
- Parent: Disney Television Group
- Key people: Debra O'Connell; Dana Walden; Craig Erwich; James Pitaro (ESPN)
- Sister channels: List: ACC Network; Disney Channel; Disney Jr.; Disney XD; ESPN; ESPN2; ESPNU; ESPNews; ESPN Deportes; Freeform; FX; FXX; FXM; National Geographic; Nat Geo Wild; Nat Geo Mundo; NFL Network; NFL RedZone; SEC Network

History
- Founded: As the Blue Network January 1, 1927; 99 years ago; Present broadcaster May 15, 1943; 83 years ago
- Launched: Radio: October 12, 1943; 83 years ago; Television: April 19, 1948; 78 years ago
- Founder: Edward J. Noble; Louis Blanche
- Replaced: Blue Network
- Former names: NBC Blue Network

Links
- Website: abc.com

Availability

Streaming media
- Affiliated Streaming Service(s): Disney+ Hulu; ESPN
- DirecTV Stream: Channel 396 (ABC HD East); Channel 397 (ABC HD West)
- Service(s): DirecTV Stream, FuboTV, Hulu + Live TV, Sling TV (owned-and-operated stations only), YouTube TV

American Broadcasting Companies, Inc. (doing business as American Broadcasting Company, abbreviated as ABC) is an American commercial broadcasting television network that serves as the flagship property of the Disney Television Group division of the Walt Disney Company. The youngest of the "Big Three" American television networks, the network is sometimes referred to as the Alphabet Network, as its initialism also represents the first three letters of the English alphabet in order.

ABC launched as a radio network in 1943, as the successor to the NBC Blue Network, which had been purchased by Edward J. Noble. It was simply called The Blue Network until June of 1945 when it became The American Broadcasting Company (ABC). It extended its operations to television in 1948, following in the footsteps of established broadcast networks CBS and NBC, as well as the lesser-known DuMont. In the mid-1950s, ABC merged with United Paramount Theatres (UPT), a chain of movie theaters that formerly operated as a subsidiary of Paramount Pictures. Leonard Goldenson, who had been the head of UPT, made the then-new television network profitable by helping to develop and green-light many successful television series. In the 1980s, after purchasing an 80 percent interest in cable sports channel ESPN, the network's corporate parent, American Broadcasting Companies, Inc., merged with Capital Cities Communications, owner of several television and radio stations and print publications, to form Capital Cities/ABC Inc., which in turn merged into Disney in 1996.

ABC has eight owned-and-operated and more than 230 affiliated television stations throughout the United States and its territories. Some ABC-affiliated stations can also be seen in Canada via pay-television providers, and certain other affiliates can also be received over-the-air in areas near the Canada–United States border, although most of its prime time programming is subject to simultaneous substitution regulations for pay television providers imposed by the Canadian Radio-television and Telecommunications Commission (CRTC) to protect rights held by domestically based networks. ABC News, through ABC News Radio, provides news and feature content to over 1,900 affiliated radio stations.

ABC is headquartered on Riverside Drive in Burbank, California, directly across the street from Walt Disney Studios and adjacent to the Team Disney – Roy E. Disney Animation Building.

The network maintains secondary offices at 7 Hudson Square in New York City's Lower Manhattan neighborhood, which houses its broadcast center and the headquarters of its news division, ABC News. Until early 2025, the network's East Coast operations were based at 77 West 66th Street on the Upper West Side of Manhattan. Since 2007, when ABC Radio (later known as Cumulus Media Networks) was sold to Citadel Broadcasting, ABC has reduced its broadcasting operations almost exclusively to television, though it continues to produce ABC News Radio, and a new ABC Radio (later renamed ABC Audio) was established in 2015.

== History ==
In 1927, NBC operated a radio network called the NBC Blue Network. It became an independent radio (and eventually television) network known as the American Broadcasting Company (ABC) in 1943. ABC later joined United Paramount Theatres forming American Broadcasting-Paramount Theatres (later American Broadcasting Companies, Inc.). After its venture into radio and television throughout the 1960s and 1970s and the purchase of ESPN in 1982, the company was acquired and merged with Capital Cities, forming Capital Cities/ABC in 1986. The company was sold to the Walt Disney Company in 1996.

== Programming ==
The ABC television network provides an average of 89 hours of network programming each week. It also offers 22 hours of prime-time programming to affiliated stations from 8:00 p.m. to 11:00 p.m. Monday through Saturday (Eastern and Pacific Time) and 7:00 p.m. to 11:00 p.m. on Sundays.

Daytime programming is also provided from 11:00 a.m. to 3:00 p.m. Eastern and Pacific weekdays (subtract 1 hour for all other time zones) (with a one-hour break at 12:00 p.m. Eastern/Pacific for stations to air newscasts, locally produced programming or syndicated programs) featuring the talk-lifestyle shows The View and GMA: The Third Hour, and the soap opera General Hospital. In addition, ABC News programming includes Good Morning America from 7:00 a.m. to 9:00 a.m. weekdays and Saturdays (along with one-hour Sunday editions), nightly editions of ABC World News Tonight (whose weekend editions are occasionally subject to abbreviation or preemption due to sports telecasts overrunning into the program's timeslot), the Sunday political talk show This Week, early morning news programs World News Now and Good Morning America First Look and the late-night newsmagazine Nightline. Late night features the weeknight talk show Jimmy Kimmel Live!.

The network's three-hour Weekend morning children's programming timeslot is programmed by syndication distributor Litton Entertainment, which produces Litton's Weekend Adventure under an arrangement in which the programming block is syndicated exclusively to ABC owned-and-operated and affiliated stations, rather than being leased out directly by the network to Litton.

=== Daytime ===
ABC's daytime schedule features the talk show The View, news show GMA3, and the soap opera General Hospital. Originally premiering in 1963, General Hospital is ABC's longest-running entertainment program. In addition to the long-running All My Children (1970–2011) and One Life to Live (1968–2012), notable past soap operas seen on the daytime lineup include Ryan's Hope, Dark Shadows, Loving, The City and Port Charles. ABC also aired the last nine years of the Procter & Gamble-produced soap The Edge of Night, following its cancellation by CBS in 1975. ABC Daytime has also aired several game shows, including The Dating Game, The Newlywed Game, Let's Make a Deal, Password, Split Second, The $10,000/$20,000 Pyramid, Family Feud, The Better Sex, Trivia Trap, All-Star Blitz and Hot Streak.

=== Sports ===
Sports programming is provided on occasion, primarily on weekend afternoons and Saturday evenings. In 2006, the ABC Sports division was shut down, with all sports telecasts on ABC since then being produced in association with sister cable network ESPN under the branding ESPN on ABC. General industry trends and changes in rights have prompted reductions in sports on broadcast television, with Disney preferring to schedule the majority of its sports rights on the networks of ESPN (until 2020). Since 2020 ESPN has prioritized ABC with airings of its sports telecasts with occasional simulcasts and exclusive games of ESPN Monday Night Football broadcasts on ABC.

Since 2006, ABC has at least aired 10 weeks of primetime sports programming, and since 2020 has aired sports programming almost every week from September to May each year (with primetime encores and movies airing the remainder of the year). ABC is the broadcast television rightsholder of the National Basketball Association (NBA), with its package (under the NBA on ESPN branding) traditionally beginning with its Christmas Day games, followed by a series of Saturday night and Sunday afternoon games through the remainder of the season, weekend playoff games, and all games of the NBA Finals. ABC is also the broadcast television rightsholder of the National Hockey League (NHL), with its package (under the NHL on ESPN branding). In this deal, ABC broadcasts at least 10 regular season games (mostly afternoon), the NHL All-Star Game, the NHL Stadium Series, and four Stanley Cup Finals. During college football season, ABC typically carries an afternoon doubleheader on Saturdays, along with the primetime Saturday Night Football. ABC also airs coverage of selected bowl games. ABC also airs Major League Baseball (MLB) games on select weekends as part of ESPN's MLB package. Beginning in the 2015 NFL season, ESPN agreed to begin simulcasting/exclusively airing NFL games on ABC. Thus, ABC is the only major broadcast network that carries games from all of the traditional "big four" sports leagues (MLB, NFL, NBA, NHL).

During the late winter months, ABC airs both men's and women's college basketball games on weekend afternoons. In the spring and summer months, ABC also airs games (usually on weekends) from the Women's National Basketball Association (WNBA), and is the broadcast home of the X Games and Little League World Series. In 2015, ESPN's annual ESPY Awards presentation moved to ABC from ESPN. Bolstered by Caitlyn Jenner accepting the inaugural Arthur Ashe Courage Award during the ceremony, the 2015 ESPY Awards' viewership was roughly tripled over the 2014 ceremony on ESPN. After the NFL signed a new contract with the Walt Disney Company, ABC will air Super Bowl LXI in 2027 and Super Bowl LXV in 2031. ABC has not aired a Super Bowl since Super Bowl XL in 2006.

=== Specials ===
ABC holds the broadcast rights to the Academy Awards, Primetime Emmy Awards, (Note: Broadcast rights to the Primetime Emmy Awards are rotated across all four major networks on a year-to-year basis) and the Country Music Association Awards. (Note: Along with two associated specials, the CMA Music Festival and CMA Country Christmas.) ABC has also aired the Miss America competition from 1954 to 1956, 1997 to 2004, and 2011 to 2018.

From February 2001 to February 14, 2020, ABC held the television rights to most of the Peanuts television specials, having acquired the broadcast rights from CBS, which originated the specials in 1965 with the debut of A Charlie Brown Christmas (other Peanuts specials broadcast annually by ABC, in addition to A Charlie Brown Christmas, include Charlie Brown's All Stars!, It's the Great Pumpkin, Charlie Brown, You're Not Elected, Charlie Brown, A Charlie Brown Thanksgiving, It's the Easter Beagle, Charlie Brown, Be My Valentine, Charlie Brown, She's a Good Skate, Charlie Brown, Happy New Year, Charlie Brown!, The Mayflower Voyagers, A Charlie Brown Valentine, Charlie Brown's Christmas Tales and I Want a Dog for Christmas, Charlie Brown). ABC also broadcasts the annual Disney Parks Christmas Day Parade special on Christmas morning.

Since 1974, ABC has generally aired Dick Clark's New Year's Rockin' Eve – a New Year's Eve special featuring music performances and coverage of festivities in New York's Times Square. (Note: The only exception was in 1999, when ABC instead broadcast ABC 2000 Today, a day-long telecast produced by ABC News as part of the 2000 Today consortium, which was hosted by Peter Jennings and covered festivities from around the world (Dick Clark co-hosted coverage from Times Square).) ABC is also among the broadcasters of the Tournament of Roses Parade (although as mentioned, the Rose Bowl Game now airs exclusively on ESPN as a College Football Playoff "New Year's Six" bowl).

=== Programming library ===
ABC owns nearly all of its in-house television and theatrical productions made since the 1970s, except certain co-productions (for example, The Commish is now owned by the estate of its producer, Stephen Cannell). Worldwide video rights are owned by various companies, for example, Kino Lorber owns the North American home video rights to the ABC feature film library (along with some lesser-known live-action films from Disney's library, mostly from Touchstone Pictures, Hollywood Pictures and 20th Century Studios).

When the FCC imposed its Financial Interest and Syndication Rules in 1970, ABC proactively created two companies: Worldvision Enterprises as a syndication distributor, and ABC Circle Films as a production company. However, between the publication and implementation of these regulations, the separation of the network's catalog was made in 1973. The broadcast rights to pre-1973 productions were transferred to Worldvision, which became independent in the same year. The company has been sold several times since Paramount Television acquired it in 1999, and has most recently been absorbed into CBS Media Ventures (formerly CBS Television Distribution), a unit of Skydance Corporation, which owns the competitor CBS. Nonetheless, Worldvision sold portions of its catalog, including the Ruby-Spears and Hanna-Barbera libraries, to Turner Broadcasting System (now a part of Warner Bros. parent company Warner Bros. Discovery) in 1991. In February 2026, according to David Zaslav, the acquisition between Paramount and Warner Bros. is expected to close within 6-12 months, pending regulatory and shareholder approval. The process of the merger between Paramount Skydance and WBD officially closed in October 2026, effectively bringing together under it's branding known as Skydance. With Disney's 1996 purchase of ABC, ABC Circle Films was absorbed into Touchstone Television, a Disney subsidiary which in turn was renamed ABC Studios in 2007.

Also part of the library are most films in the David O. Selznick library, productions from their previous motion picture divisions ABC Pictures International, Selmur Productions, and Palomar Pictures International (before its takeover by Bristol-Myers-Squibb) released by Cinerama Productions (films produced by the company themselves are now under the control of Pacific Theatres), their later theatrical division ABC Motion Pictures, and the in-house productions it continues to produce (such as America's Funniest Home Videos, General Hospital, ABC News productions, and series from Disney Television Studios (ABC Signature and 20th Television). Disney–ABC Domestic Television (formerly known as Buena Vista Television and 20th Television) handles domestic television distribution, while Disney–ABC International Television (formerly known as Buena Vista International Television) handles international television distribution.

== Stations ==
Since its inception, ABC has had over 300 television stations that have carried programming from the network at various times throughout its history, including its first two owned-and-operated and affiliated stations, founding O&O WABC-TV and inaugural affiliate WPVI-TV. As of 2020, ABC has eight owned-and-operated stations, and current and pending affiliation agreements with 236 additional television stations encompassing 50 states, the District of Columbia, four U.S. possessions, Bermuda, and Saba. This makes ABC the largest U.S. broadcast television network by the total number of affiliates. The network has an estimated national reach of 97.72% of all households in the United States (or 305,347,338 Americans with at least one television set). New Jersey, Rhode Island, and Delaware are the only U.S. states where ABC does not have a locally licensed affiliate (New Jersey is served by New York City O&O WABC-TV in the north half of the state and Philadelphia O&O WPVI-TV in the south, Rhode Island is served by New Bedford, Massachusetts-licensed WLNE, though outside of the transmitter, all other operations for the station are based in Providence, and Delaware is served by WPVI in the northern two thirds and Salisbury, Maryland, affiliate WMDT in the southern third of the state).

ABC maintains affiliations with low-power stations (broadcasting either in analog or digital) in a few markets, such as Birmingham, Alabama (WBMA-LD), Lima, Ohio (WPNM-LD) and South Bend, Indiana (WBND-LD). In some markets, including Lima and South Bend, these stations also maintain digital simulcasts on a subchannel of a co-owned/co-managed full-power television station. The network has the unusual distinction of having separately owned-and-operated affiliates which serve the same market in Tampa, Florida (WFTS-TV and WWSB), Boston, Massachusetts (WCVB-TV and WMUR-TV), Lincoln, Nebraska (KLKN and KHGI-TV), and Grand Rapids, Michigan (WZZM and WOTV), with an analogous situation arising in Kansas City, Missouri (KMBC-TV and KQTV). KQTV is licensed to St. Joseph, which Nielsen designates as a separate market from Kansas City, despite a mere 55-mile (89 km) distance between the two cities and the Kansas City-based stations (including KMBC) providing better city-grade to Grade B coverage to the area compared to the signals of the primary ABC affiliates in the other aforementioned dual-affiliate markets. KQTV was St. Joseph's lone major network affiliate until 2011, when locally based News-Press & Gazette Company began establishing low-power affiliates of ABC's four English-language competitors and Telemundo on three low-power stations to end St. Joseph's dependence on Kansas City. WWSB, KHGI, and WOTV serve areas that do not receive an adequate signal from their market's primary ABC affiliate.

ABC initially affiliated with WWSB to cover southern portions of the Tampa–St. Petersburg market—including WWSB's city of license, Sarasota—as the transmitters of WTSP, the market's former primary ABC affiliate from 1965 to 1994, and former Miami affiliate WPLG had been short-spaced to avoid interference between their respective analog-VHF channel 10 signals, WWSB remained an ABC affiliate after its Tampa affiliation moved from WTSP to WFTS in December 1994, even though WFTS's signal reaches Sarasota and some surrounding areas. WCVB-TV is licensed to Boston while WMUR-TV is licensed to Manchester, New Hampshire (which is officially part of the Boston market). WCVB is easily receivable in Manchester with a good antenna as well as having its news department that covers New Hampshire; it is the only station licensed to the state that does such. Both WCVB and WMUR are owned by Hearst Television.

The Sinclair Broadcast Group is the largest operator of ABC stations by numerical total, owning or providing services to 28 full, primary ABC affiliates and two subchannel-only affiliates. Sinclair owns the largest ABC subchannel affiliate by market size, WABM-DT2/WDBB-DT2 in the Birmingham market, which serves as repeaters of WBMA-LD (which itself is also simulcast on a subchannel of former WBMA satellite WGWW, owned by Sinclair partner company Howard Stirk Holdings). The E. W. Scripps Company is the largest operator of ABC stations in terms of overall market reach, owning 15 ABC-affiliated stations including affiliates in larger markets such as Cleveland (WEWS-TV), Phoenix (KNXV-TV), Detroit (WXYZ-TV), and Denver (KMGH-TV). Through its ownership of Phoenix affiliate KNXV, Las Vegas affiliate KTNV-TV, and Tucson affiliate KGUN-TV, it is the only provider of ABC programming for the majority of Arizona (outside the Yuma–El Centro market) and Southern Nevada. Scripps also owns and operates several ABC stations in the Mountain and Pacific time zones, including in Denver, San Diego (KGTV), Bakersfield, California (KERO-TV), and Boise, Idaho (KIVI-TV). When combined with the ABC Owned Television Stations in Los Angeles (KABC-TV), Fresno (KFSN-TV), and San Francisco (KGO-TV, the affiliations from the News-Press & Gazette Company in Santa Barbara (KEYT-TV), Palm Springs (KESQ-TV), Yuma–El Centro (KECY-TV), and Colorado Springs–Pueblo (KRDO-TV), and Sinclair's affiliations in Seattle (KOMO-TV) and Portland, Oregon (KATU), these four entities control the access of ABC network programming in most of the Western United States, particularly in terms of audience reach.

At the time of Jimmy Kimmel's suspension in September 2025, among other properties owned by the two companies, Nexstar Media Group owned or provided services to 201 stations serving 116 markets, while Sinclair owned or provided services to 178 stations in 81 markets. Based on 2024–25 Nielsen Media Research market estimates, the ABC owned-and-operated station subsidiary ABC Owned Television Stations (whose eight stations are mostly clustered in major markets like New York City, Los Angeles, Chicago, San Francisco, Philadelphia, and Houston) was the largest owner of ABC stations by cumulative national market share, covering 21.87% of American households. Individually, Sinclair and Nexstar were respectively the second- and fourth-largest owners of ABC stations, reaching 14.56% and 9.28% of American households respectively (with The E. W. Scripps Company, with 17 affiliates covering 12.87% of the United States, being the third-largest).

== Facilities and studios ==
All of ABC's owned-and-operated stations and affiliates have had their facilities and studios, but transverse entities have been created to produce national programming. As a result, television series were produced by ABC Circle Films beginning in 1962 and by Touchstone Television beginning in 1985, before Touchstone was reorganized as ABC Studios in February 2007 and given its current name ABC Signature in August 2020. Since the 1950s, ABC has had two main production facilities: the ABC Television Center (now The Prospect Studios) on Prospect Avenue in Hollywood, California, shared with the operations of KABC-TV until 1999, and the ABC Television Center, East, a set of studios located throughout New York City.

In addition to the headquarters building on Riverside Drive, other ABC facilities in Burbank include a building at 3800 West Alameda, known as 'Burbank Center', then moved to ABC Riverside which is primarily associated with Walt Disney Entertainment Television and functions as the headquarters and broadcast center for Disney Channel, Disney Junior, Disney XD, Freeform, FX, National Geographic, and the former Radio Disney. Additionally, Disney Television Animation has a facility on Empire Avenue near the Hollywood Burbank Airport. In nearby Glendale, Disney/ABC also maintains the Grand Central Creative Campus, which houses other company subsidiaries, including the studios of KABC-TV and the Los Angeles bureau of ABC News.

ABC owned several facilities in New York, grouped mainly on West 66th Street, with the main set of facilities on the corner of Columbus Avenue. These facilities occupy a combined 105,000 square feet (9,800 m^{2}) across two blocks with a total area of 159,000 square feet (14,800 m^{2}). This main set of buildings includes:

- 77 West 66th Street, a 22-story building built in 1988 on a 175-by-200-foot (53 m × 61 m) plot;
- A pair of buildings at 147–155 Columbus Avenue (ten and seven stories) connected by glass bays, constructed on a 150-by-200-foot (46 m × 61 m) plot;
- 30 West 67th Street, a 15-story building with a facade on 67th Street on a 100-by-100-foot (30 m × 30 m) plot;
- 56 West 66th Street, the former First Battery Armory of the New York National Guard, a five-story building on a 174-by-100-foot (53 m × 30 m) plot.

ABC also owns 7, 17 and 47 West 66th Street, three buildings on a 375-by-100-foot (114 m × 30 m) plot. The block of West 66th Street between Central Park West and Columbus Avenue, which houses the ABC News building, was renamed Peter Jennings Way in 2006 in honor of the then-recently deceased news anchor. Disney formerly leased 70,000 sq ft (6,500 m^{2}) at 157 Columbus Avenue, on the northern side of 67th Street.

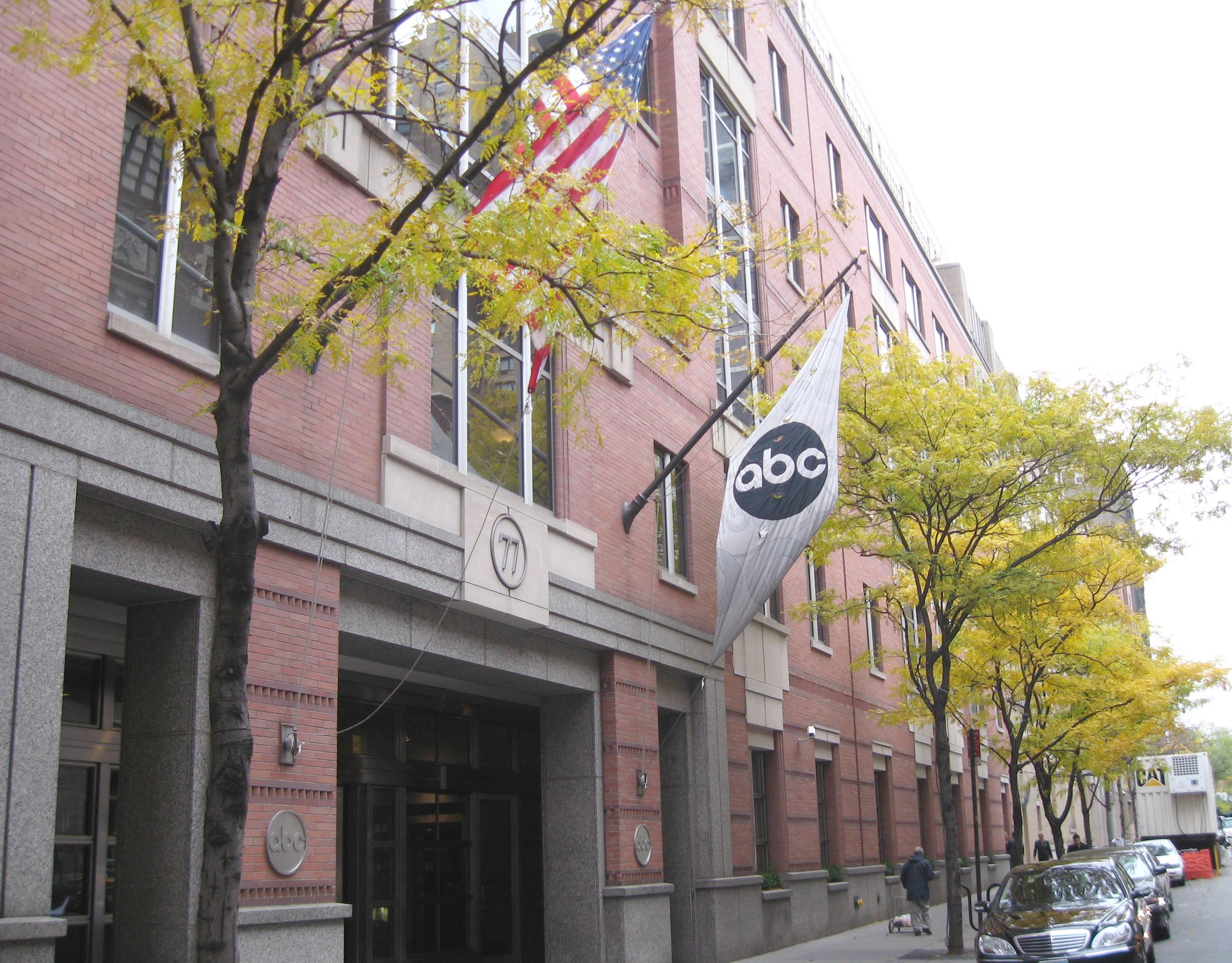
Entrance of ABC's headquarters at 77 West 66th Street

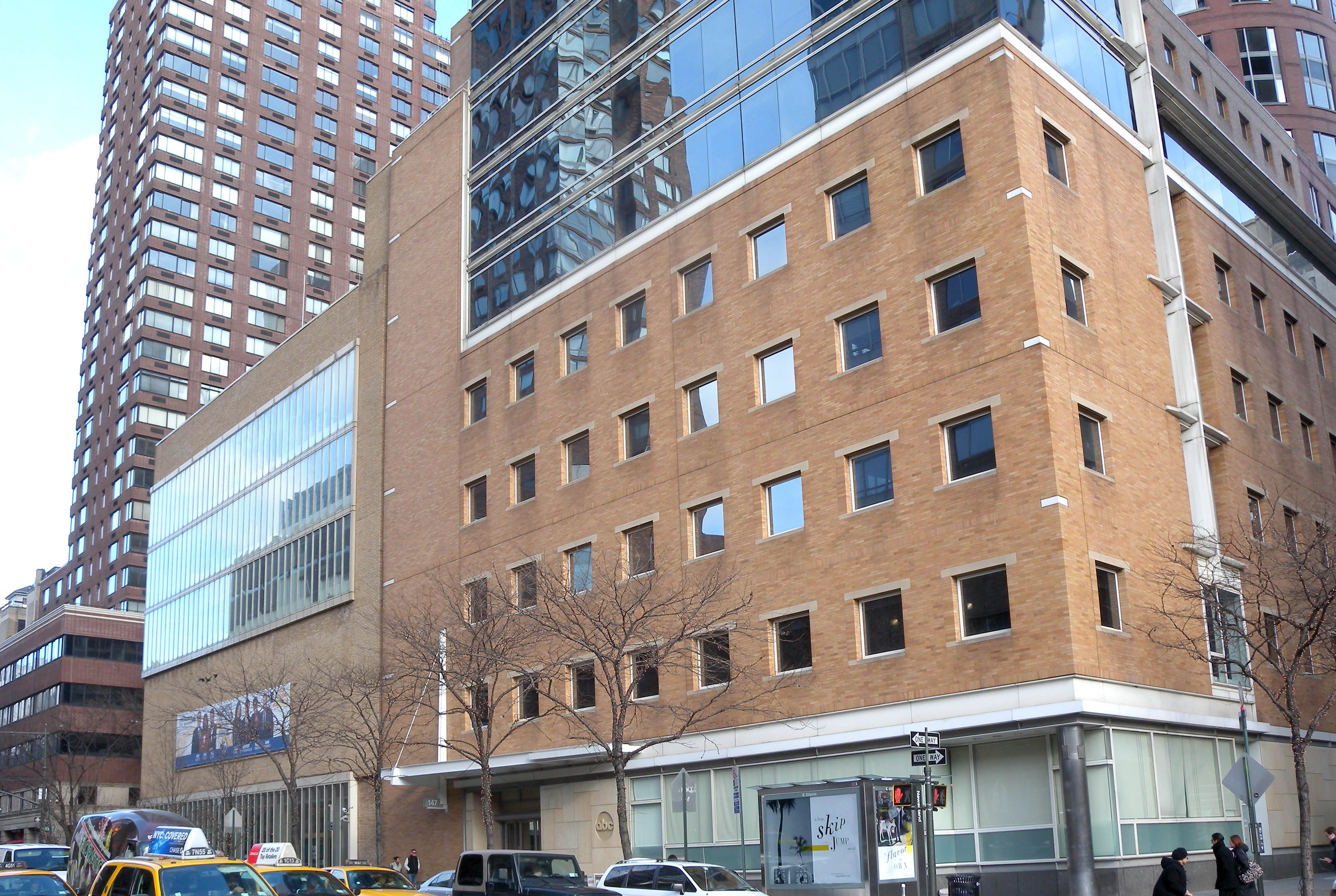
WABC-TV buildings at 147–155 Columbus Avenue and behind 157 Columbus Avenue

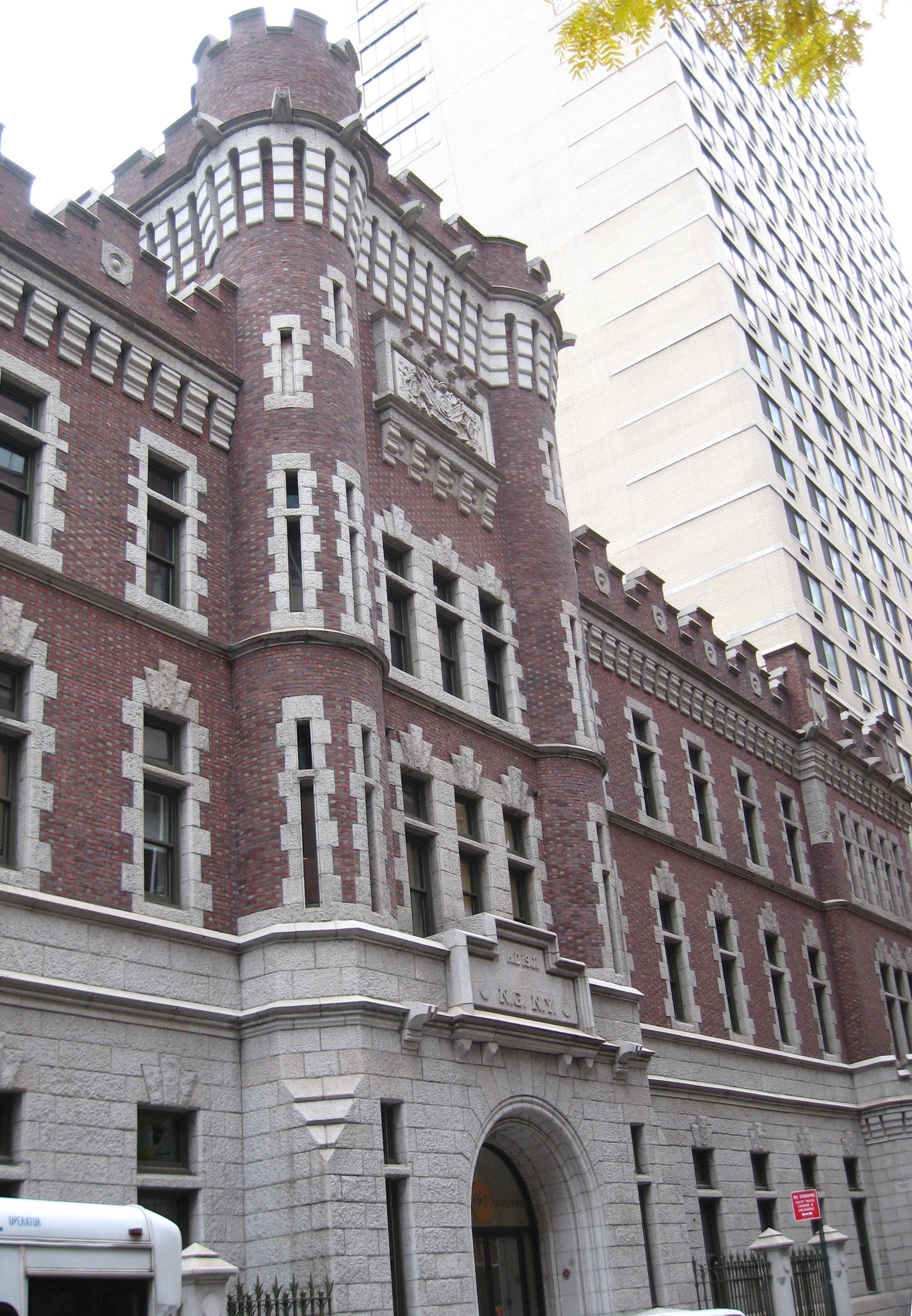
ABC facilities in the former First Battery Armory of the New York National Guard

ABC owns the Times Square Studios at 1500 Broadway, on land owned by a development fund for the 42nd Street Project. Opened in September 1999, Good Morning America was broadcast from this facility until June 13, 2025. ABC News had premises on West 66th Street, in a six-story building occupying a 196-by-379-foot (60 m × 116 m) plot at 121–135 West End Avenue. On July 9, 2018, the Walt Disney Company announced that it was selling its two West 66th Street campuses (except for the National Guard Armory) to Silverstein Properties and purchasing one square block of property in lower Manhattan to build a new New York-based broadcast center. The building, known as 7 Hudson Square, opened in 2024 with The View being the first show to move to the new broadcast facility. The Tamron Hall talk show, ABC News, WABC-TV, ESPN, and Good Morning America all moved their operations to the new facility separately from January–June 2025.

== Related services ==
=== Video-on-demand services ===
ABC maintains several video on demand (VOD) services for delayed viewing of the network's programming, including a traditional VOD service called ABC on Demand, which is carried on most traditional cable and IPTV providers. The Walt Disney Company is also a part-owner of Hulu, and has offered full-length episodes of most of ABC's programming through this streaming service since July 6, 2009.

In May 2013, ABC launched "WatchABC", a revamp of its traditional multi-platform streaming services encompassing the network's existing streaming portal at ABC.com and a mobile app for smartphones and tablet computers. This service provides full-length episodes of ABC programs and live streams of local affiliates in select markets (this was the first such offering by a U.S. broadcast network). Live streams are only available to authenticated subscribers of participating pay television providers. WABC-TV New York and WPVI-TV Philadelphia were the first stations to offer streams of their programming on the service, with the six remaining ABC O&Os offering streams by the start of the 2013–14 season. Hearst Television also reached a deal to offer streams of its ABC affiliates on the service, though as of 2016 these stations are only available for live-streaming for DirecTV subscribers.

In November 2015, it was reported that ABC had been developing a slate of original digital series for the WatchABC service, internally codenamed ABC3. In July 2016, ABC re-launched its streaming platforms, dropping the WatchABC brand, adding a streaming library of 38 classic ABC series, and introducing 7 original short-form series under the blanket branding ABCd.

The most recent episodes of the network's shows are usually made available on the ABC app, Hulu, and ABC on Demand the day after their original broadcast. In addition, ABC on Demand disallows fast forwarding of accessed content. In 2021, ABC updated the app to allow app users to watch shows from ABC's sister networks: Freeform, FX, and National Geographic. Free ad-supported streaming television channels were added to the ABC app in 2022 and 2023, including a 24-hour version of ESPN8 The Ocho and a seasonal channel dedicated to Freeform's 25 Days of Christmas original content. On August 23, 2024, Disney began notifying its carriage partners that it would discontinue the mobile and digital media player apps for ABC, along with DisneyNow, Freeform, FX, and National Geographic, effective September 23. However, TV Everywhere content would still be available via their respective websites in order to funnel viewers towards Disney+ and Hulu.

=== ABC HD ===
ABC HD

Programming
- Language: English
- Picture format: 720p (4:3/16:9)

History
- Launched: September 16, 2001; 25 years ago
- Closed: March 24, 2017; 9 years ago

ABC's master feed is transmitted in 720p high-definition, the native resolution format for the Walt Disney Company's American television properties. However, most of Hearst Television's ABC-affiliated stations and some of Tegna's ABC affiliates transmit the network's programming in 1080i, while 11 other affiliates owned by various companies carry the network feed in 480i standard definition either due to technical considerations for affiliates of other major networks that carry ABC programming on a digital subchannel or because a primary feed ABC affiliate has not yet upgraded their transmission equipment to allow content to be presented in HD. Although ABC has not fully transitioned to 1080p or ultra HD, some stations such as ABC affiliate station KNXV-TV in Phoenix, Arizona, transmit the network's programming at 1080p via an ATSC 3.0 multiplex stations, such as KASW with KNXV-TV.

ABC began its conversion to high definition with the launch of its simulcast feed, ABC HD, on September 16, 2001, at the start of the 2001–02 season, with its scripted prime-time series becoming the first shows to upgrade to the format, the simulcast feed was launched first on ABC's owned television stations that same date with many major affiliates following after that. Both new and returning scripted series were broadcast in high definition. In 2011, Extreme Makeover: Home Edition was the last program on the network's schedule that was broadcast in 4:3 standard definition. All of the network's new programming has been presented in HD since January 2012. The affiliate-syndicated Saturday morning educational and informative (E/I) block Litton's Weekend Adventure was the first children's program block on U.S. network television to feature programs available in HD upon its September 2011 debut. The HD programming is broadcast in 5.1 surround sound.

On September 1, 2016, ABC began to use 16:9 framing for its most graphical imaging (primarily the network's bug, in-program promotions and generic closing credit sequences as well as sports telecasts, where the bottom line and scoreboard elements now extend outside the 4:3 frame), requiring its stations and pay television providers to display its programming in a compulsory widescreen format, either in high definition or standard definition. With this change, some programs also began positioning their main on-screen credits outside the 4:3 aspect ratio.

== Visual identity ==
Logo from 1957 to 1962.

The first "ABC Circle" logo, designed by Paul Rand on October 19, 1962.

Logo from September 10, 1988, to August 14, 2007.

Glassy version from August 15, 2007 to May 29, 2013.

Gold-colored version of the logo from May 30, 2013 to September 13, 2018.

Logo from 2018 to 2021.

The ABC logo has evolved many times since the network's creation in 1943. The network's first logo, introduced in 1946, consisted of a television screen containing the letters "T" and "V,” with a vertical ABC microphone in the center, referencing the network's roots in radio. When the ABC-UPT merger was finalized in 1953, the network introduced a new logo based on the FCC seal, with the letters "ABC" enclosed in a circular shield surmounted by a bald eagle. In 1957, just before the television network began its first color broadcasts, the ABC logo consisted of a tiny lowercase αbc in the center of a large lowercase letter α, a design known as the ABC Circle A. In 1962, graphic designer Paul Rand redesigned the ABC logo (nicknamed the "ABC Circle") into its current and best-known form, with the lowercase letters "αbc" enclosed in a single black circle. The new logo debuted on-air on October 19 of the same year, but it was not until the following spring that it was fully adopted. The letters are strongly reminiscent of the Bauhaus typeface designed by Herbert Bayer in the 1920s, but also share similarities with several other fonts, such as ITC Avant Garde and Horatio, and most closely resembling Chalet. The logo's simplicity made it easier to redesign and duplicate, which was beneficial before the advent of computer graphics. A color version of the logo was also developed around 1963, and animated as a brief 10-second intro to be shown before the then-small handful of network programs broadcast in color (similar to the NBC "Laramie" peacock intro used during that era). The "a" was rendered in red, the "b" in blue, and the "c" in green, against the same single black circle. A variant of this color logo, with the colored letters against a white circle, was also commonly used throughout the 1960s.

The 1970s and 1980s saw the emergence of many graphical imaging packages for the network which based the logo's setting mainly on special lighting effects then under development including white, blue, pink, rainbow neon, and glittering dotted lines. Among the ABC Circle logo's many variants was a 1977 ID sequence that featured a bubble on a black background representing the circle with glossy gold letters, and was the first ABC identification card to simulate a three-dimensional appearance.

In 1983, for the 40th anniversary of the network's founding, ID sequences had the logo appear in a gold CGI design on a blue background, accompanied by the slogan "That Special Feeling" in a script font. Ten years later, in 1993, the "ABC Circle" logo reverted to its classic white-on-black color scheme, but with gloss effects on both the circle and the letters, and a bronze border surrounding the circle. The ABC logo first appeared as an on-screen bug in the 1993–94 season, appearing initially only for 60 seconds at the beginning of an act or segment, then appearing throughout programs beginning in the 1995–96 season, the respective iterations of the translucent logo bug were also incorporated within program promotions until the 2011–12 season.

During the 1997–98 season, the network began using a minimalist graphical identity with a yellow and black motif, designed by Pittard Sullivan, featuring a small black-and-white "ABC Circle" logo on a yellow background (promotions during this time also featured a sequence of still photos of the stars of its programs during the timeslot card as well as the schedule sequence that began each night's prime time lineup). A new four-note theme tune (composed by Mad Bus Music) was introduced alongside the package, based around the network's then-new "We Love TV" image campaign from the 1998–99 season, creating an audio signature in comparative parlance to the NBC chimes, CBS's various sound marks (including the five-note version introduced in 2020) and the Fox fanfare (which was phased out by the Fox network in 2019). The four-note signature has been updated with every television season thereafter until the 2020–21 season.

In 1999, ABC launched a web-based promotional campaign focused around its circle logo, also called 'the dot', in which comic book character Little Dot prompted visitors to "download the dot,” a program which would cause the ABC logo to fly around the screen and settle in the bottom-right corner. The network hired the Troika Design Group to design and produce its 2001–02 identity, which continued using the black-and-yellow coloring of the logo and featured dots and stripes in various promotional and identification spots.

On June 10, 2007, ABC began to phase in a new imaging campaign for the upcoming 2007–08 season, "Start Here". Also developed by Troika, the package was intended to provide a more consistent branding to the network, and emphasize the availability of ABC's content across multiple platforms: the logo was redesigned as a glassy disc, accompanied by animated water and ribbon effects (with red ribbons representing entertainment, and blue ribbons representing ABC News), and a system of icons denoting platforms such as TV, computers, and mobile devices.

ABC introduced a revision to its logo and branding by Loyalkaspar for the 2013–14 season, the logo carried a simpler gloss design than the 2007 version, and had lettering closer-resembling Paul Rand's original version of the circle logo. A custom typeface inspired by the ABC logotype, ABC Modern, was also created for use in advertising and other promotional elements. The logo was used in various color schemes, with a gold version used primarily for ABC's entertainment divisions, a red version used primarily for ESPN on ABC, steel blue and dark grey versions used primarily by ABC News, and all four colors used interchangeably in promotions. Upon a reimaging by The New Blank for the 2018–19 season, the blue, red, and yellow variants were dropped, with the dark grey version becoming ABC's main logo. Surrounding promotional elements adopted a circular "echo" motif and the new slogan "America's Network".

Another revision to the logo was introduced on August 9, 2021, ahead of the 2021–22 season. Designed by Trollbäck & Company, it is designed to adhere to flat design trends, and returns to a solid, two-dimensional design with smaller and bolder lettering. The main logo is rendered in a dark, blue-gray color, while outlined and black-on-red variations are also used (such as for the on-screen bug and promotional usage respectively). The 2021 rebrand also introduced a sonic logo that retains three out of the four notes of ABC's prior audio logo and was composed by YouTooCanWoo.

ABC logo with Hulu streaming lockup

The Circle 7 logo, designed in 1962, is also commonly associated with ABC affiliates who broadcast on channel 7, including its flagship local stations WABC-TV (New York City), KABC-TV (Los Angeles), KGO-TV (San Francisco) and WLS-TV (Chicago). This logo was intended to be used somewhat interchangeably by these stations with the main circular network logo and has itself also become an iconic symbol of the ABC network. KGO was the first of the ABC-owned stations to use the Circle 7 logo, starting on August 27, 1962, by the end of the year, the other ABC-owned stations began using the logo, and have continued to do so since.

== International broadcasts ==
The first attempts to internationalize the ABC television network dates to the 1950s, when Goldenson tried to use the same strategies he had in expanding UPT's theater operation to the international market. Goldenson said that ABC's first international activity was broadcasting the coronation of Queen Elizabeth II in June 1953, CBS and NBC were delayed in covering the coronation due to flight delays. Goldenson tried international investing, having ABC invest in stations in the Latin American market, acquiring a 51% interest in a network covering Central America and in 1959 established program distributor Worldvision Enterprises. Goldenson also cited interest in Japan in the early 1950s, acquiring a 5% stake in two new domestic networks, the Mainichi Broadcasting System in 1951 and TV Asahi in 1957. Goldenson also invested in broadcasting properties in Beirut in the mid-1960s.

The goal was to create a network of wholly and partially owned channels and affiliates to rebroadcast the network's programs. In 1959, this rerun activity was completed with program syndication, with ABC Films selling programs to networks not owned by ABC. The arrival of satellite television ended the need for ABC to hold interests in other countries, many governments also wanted to increase their independence and strengthen legislation to limit foreign ownership of broadcasting properties. As a result, ABC was forced to sell all of its interests in international networks, mainly in Japan and Latin America, in the 1970s; a partial stake in the Republic Broadcasting System in the Philippines was forcibly removed in 1974 after the declaration of martial law under Ferdinand Marcos in September 1972.

The second period of international expansion is linked to that of the ESPN network in the 1990s, and policies enacted in the 2000s by Disney Media Networks. These policies included the expansion of several of the company's U.S.-based cable networks including Disney Channel and its spinoffs Toon Disney, Playhouse Disney and Jetix, although Disney also sold its 33% stake in European sports channel Eurosport for $155 million in June 2000. In contrast to Disney's other channels, ABC broadcasts in the United States with programming syndicated in other countries. The policy regarding wholly owned international networks was revived and on September 27, 2004, ABC announced the launch of ABC1, a free-to-air channel in the United Kingdom owned by the ABC Group. However, ABC1 could not attain sustainable viewership and was shut down in October 2007.

Prior to the ABC1 closure, on October 10, 2006, Disney–ABC Television Group entered into an agreement with satellite provider Dish TV to carry its ABC News Now channel in India. However, this operation was not put into effect.

=== Australia ===
In Australia, the Nine Network maintained close ties with ABC and has used a majority of the U.S. network's image campaigns and slogans since the 1970s, in particular, "Still the One", ABC's slogan it adopted for the 1977–78 television season and again for the 1979–80 television season, was adopted by Nine for the 1978 Australian television season (before, Nine also used ABC's "Let Us Be the One" slogan), and lasted longer ever since it was re-adopted in 1980, it was Nine's main slogan until it was replaced in December 2006, only to be reintroduced in November 2021. ABC's other slogans were also adopted by Nine during the 1980–2006 period, as secondary slogans complementing the "Still the One" slogan. Nine's Wide World of Sports, the sports brand of Nine, is unrelated to ABC's Wide World of Sports.

=== Canada ===
Most Canadians have access to at least one U.S.-based ABC affiliate, either over-the-air (in areas located within proximity of the Canada–United States border) or through a cable, satellite or IPTV provider. Most ABC programs are subject to simultaneous substitution regulations imposed by the CRTC, which require television service providers to replace an American station's signal with the feed of a Canadian broadcaster carrying the same syndicated program to protect domestic programming rights and advertising revenue.

=== Mexico ===
Like Canada, ABC programming is accessible in Mexico through free-to-air affiliates located in markets near the Mexico–United States border, where their signals can be easily received over the air in northern Mexican border regions.

=== Philippines ===
In the Philippines, ABC maintained close ties with GMA Network and the unrelated Philippine network whose sharing the same abbreviation and more commonly known as TV5 regarding the content agreement with these networks.

== See also ==
- ABC Family Worldwide
- ABC Kids
- ABC Productions
- Children's programming on the American Broadcasting Company
- Disney Television Studios
  - ABC Signature
- List of American Broadcasting Company television affiliates
- List of United States over-the-air television networks
- Litton's Weekend Adventure
- Disney Entertainment Television
