= List of New York City Designated Landmarks in Manhattan from 59th to 110th Streets =

The New York City Landmarks Preservation Commission (LPC), formed in 1965, is the New York City governmental commission that administers the city's Landmarks Preservation Law. Since its founding, it has designated over a thousand landmarks, classified into four categories: individual landmarks, interior landmarks, scenic landmarks, and historic districts.

The New York City borough of Manhattan contains many designated landmarks, interior landmarks and historic districts. The section of Manhattan between 59th Street to 110th Street includes the Upper West Side, Upper East Side, and part of East Harlem. It includes numerous individual landmarks and historic districts, as well as three scenic landmarks. The following is an incomplete list. Some of these are also National Historic Landmark (NHL) sites, and NHL status is noted where known.

source: ;; date listed is date of designation;

== Historic districts ==
Landmark Nameँ	Date Designated
Carnegie Hill Historic District	July 23, 1974 ; extension: December 21, 1993
Central Harlem - West 130th-132nd Streets Historic District	May 29, 2018
Central Park West-76th Street Historic District	April 19, 1973 https://s-media.nyc.gov/agencies/lpc/lp/0713.pdf
Central Park West - West 73rd - 74th Street Historic District	July 12, 1977 https://s-media.nyc.gov/agencies/lpc/lp/0964.pdf
Hardenbergh/Rhinelander Historic District	May 5, 1998
Henderson Place Historic District	February 11, 1969
Manhattan Avenue Historic District	May 15, 2007
Metropolitan Museum Historic District	September 20, 1977
Park Avenue Historic District	April 29, 2014
Riverside Drive–West 80th–81st Streets Historic District	March 26, 1985
Riverside–West 105th Street Historic District	April 19, 1973
Riverside - West End Historic District and Extension	December 19, 1989 ; extension: June 23, 2015
Treadwell Farm Historic District	December 13, 1967
Upper East Side Historic District	May 19, 1981; extension: March 23, 2010
Upper West Side-Central Park West Historic District	April 24, 1990
West 71st Street Historic District	August 29, 1989
West End-Collegiate Historic District	January 3, 1984

== Individual Landmarks ==
=== 1 – 9 ===
Landmark Name	Image	Date Designated
1009 Fifth Avenue (Benjamin N. Duke House)		February 19, 1974
1025 Park Avenue House (Reginald DeKoven House)		October 7, 1986
103, 104, 105, 107 & 109 Riverside Drive Houses (individually designated)		April 16, 1991,,,
11 East 70th Street House		July 23, 1974
11 East 90th Street House		July 23, 1974
116 East 80th Street House (Lewis Spencer Morris House)		January 24, 1967
120 East 80th Street House (George Whitney House)		November 12, 1968
120 East 92nd Street House		November 19, 1969
122 East 92nd Street House 40.7835°N 73.9536°W		November 19, 1969
1261 Madison Avenue Apartment House		July 23, 1974
130-134 East 67th Street Apartment Building 40°46′0″N 73°57′49″W		January 8, 1980
131-135 East 66th Street Apartment House 40°45′59″N 73°57′52″W		March 4, 1969
1321 Madison Avenue House 40°47′7.2″N 73°57′19″W		July 23, 1974
143 West 95th Street House (Charles A. Vissani Residence)		February 19, 1991
146–156 East 89th Street Houses		March 13, 1979, ,,,,
149-151 East 67th Street Building (Mount Sinai Dispensary)		January 8, 1980
15 East 70th Street House		July 23, 1970
15 East 90th Street House		July 23, 1974
157-165 East 78th Street Houses		April 18, 1968
160 East 92nd Street House 40.7829°N 73.9521°W		June 7, 1988
161-167, 166–170, 171–179, 172–174, 190-182 East 73rd Street Buildings		May 13, 1980,, , , ,,,, ,,,,, ,
17-21 East 70th Street Houses		July 23, 1974, ,
17 East 90th Street House		July 23, 1974
19th (25th) Police Precinct Station House, 153 E67th St		February 23, 1999
208-218 East 78th Street Houses		May 9, 1978, , , , ,
254 West 102nd Street House 40°47′55.6″N 73°58′12.2″W		August 14, 1990
28th Police Precinct Station House (Hope Community Hall)		February 23, 1999
294 Riverside Drive House (William Baumgarten Residence) 40°47′57.7″N 73°58′19.5″W		February 19, 1991
309 West 72nd Street House		January 8, 1991
316-326, 329-337 West 85th Street Houses (individually designated)		April 16, 1991, , , ,, ,, , , ,
332 West 83rd Street House		April 16, 1991
353-355 Central Park West Houses (individually designated)		November 10, 1987 , ,
412 East 85th Street House 40.7758°N 73.9493°W		December 13, 2016
45 East 66th Street Building		November 15, 1977
520 West End Avenue Residence (Leech Residence)		August 2, 1988
56 East 93rd Street House (William Goadby Loew House)		March 14, 1972
59 East 79th Street Building (John H. Iselin Residence)		May 19, 1981
63 East 79th Street Building (Thatcher M. Adams Residence)		May 19, 1981
67-69 East 79th Street House (George Rives Residence, now Greek Consulate)		May 19, 1981
67 East 93rd Street House		July 23, 1974
69 East 93rd Street Building		January 14, 1969
72nd Street Subway Kiosk (Control House)		January 9, 1979
854-858 West End Avenue Houses (individually designated)		August 14, 1990,,
998 Fifth Avenue Apartment House		February 19, 1974

=== A – M ===
Landmark Name	Address	Image	Date Designated
American Museum of Natural History	Central Park West between West 77th Street and West 81st Street		August 24, 1967
Ansonia Hotel	2101-2119 Broadway		March 14, 1972
The Apthorp	2201-19 Broadway		September 9, 1969
The Arsenal	Central Park at 64th Street, 830 Fifth Avenue		October 12, 1967
Association Residence for Respectable Aged Indigent Females (Association Residence for Women)	891 Amsterdam Avenue		April 12, 1983
Automation House, American Foundation on Automation and Employment (Mrs. J. William Clark House)	49 East 68th Street		November 10, 1970
George F. Baker Jr. Houses (now the Synod of Bishops of the Russian Orthodox Church Outside of Russia)	75 East 93rd Street (also separately designated 67 and 69 East 93rd Street)		January 14, 1969
Barbizon Hotel for Women	140 East 63rd Street		April 17, 2012
R. Livingston Beekman House, the Serbian (formerly the Yugoslavian) UN Mission 40°46′8″N 73°58′9.5″W	854 Fifth Avenue		January 14, 1969
Hotel Belleclaire	2171 Broadway & West 77th Street 40°46′56.5″N 73°58′52.3″W		February 10, 1987
Belnord Apartments	201-225 West 86th Street		September 20, 1966
The Beresford	211 Central Park West		September 15, 1987
Bohemian National Hall	321 East 73rd Street		July 19, 1994
James A. Burden House (Convent of the Sacred Heart)	7 East 91st Street		February 19, 1974
Mrs. Amory S. Carhart House (formerly Lycée Français de New York)	3 East 95th Street 40°47′13.5″N 73°57′20.4″W		July 23, 1974
Andrew Carnegie Mansion	2 East 91st Street		February 19, 1974
Center for Inter-American Relations (Percy R. Pyne House)	680 Park Avenue		November 10, 1970
Central Savings Bank	2100-2108 Broadway		January 28, 1975
Century Apartments	25 Central Park West		July 9, 1985
Chatsworth Apartments and Annex, The 40°46′49″N 73°59′10.5″W	344-340 West 72nd Street		September 11, 1984
City and Suburban Homes Company, Avenue A (York Avenue) Estate			April 24, 1990
City and Suburban Homes Company, First Avenue Estate			April 24, 1990
Claremont Stables (Claremont Riding Academy)			August 14, 1990
Ogden Codman Jr. House (now Manhattan Country School)	7 East 96th Street		May 25, 1967
Clarence Dillon House	124 East 80th Street		January 24, 1967
Consulate General of Italy (Henry P. Davison House)	690 Park Avenue and 69th Street		November 10, 1970
The Dakota			February 11, 1969
Lucy Drexel Dahlgren House	15 East 96th Street		June 19, 1984
The Dorilton			October 8, 1974
Duke N. Benjamin House			February 19, 1974
James B. Duke House	1 East 78th Street		September 15, 1970
East River Savings Bank (Former)	743 Amsterdam Avenue at West 96th Street		February 10, 1998
El Dorado Apartments	300 Central Park West		July 9, 1985
Eleventh Judicial District Courthouse (Former) (Eleventh District Municipal Court/Seventh District Magistrates' Court) (American Theater of Actors/The Children's Museum of Manhattan)	212 West 83rd Street		June 6, 1989
Edith Fabbri House (House of the Redeemer) 40°47′13.3″N 73°57′19.0″W	7 East 95th Street		July 23, 1974
Fire Engine Company 39 and Ladder Company 16 Station House	157–159 East 67th Street		June 16, 1998
Fire Engine Company 53	175 East 104th Street		September 16, 2008
First Battery Armory (later the 102nd Medical Battalion Armory)	56 West 66th Street		August 1, 1989
First Church of Christ Scientist of New York City	1 West 96th Street		July 23, 1974
Frick Collection (Frick Art Reference Library)	1 East 70th Street N		March 20, 1973
Gracie Mansion	East End Avenue at 88th Street in Carl Schurz Park		September 20, 1966
Grammar School No. 9 (later Public School 9/John Jasper School, Mickey Mantle School/Public School 811M)	460-466 West End Avenue (253-257 West 82nd Street)		July 14, 2009
John Henry Hammond House (now houses the Consulate-General of Russia in New York City)	9 East 91st Street		July 23, 1974
Edward S. Harkness House	1 East 75th Street		January 24, 1967
Barbara Rutherford Hatch House	153 East 63 Street		January 11, 1977
Holy Trinity Church, St. Christopher House and Parsonage (Rhinelander Memorial)	312–316 and 332 East 88th Street,		February 15, 1967
Horn & Hardart Automat - Cafeteria Building	228 West 104 Street 40°47′58.3″N 73°58′4.6″W		January 30, 2007
Italian Cultural Institute of New York, Istituto Italiano di Cultura di New York (William Sloane House)	686 Park Avenue		November 10, 1970
Oliver Gould Jennings House	7 East 72nd Street		January 11, 1977
Solomon R. Guggenheim Museum	1071 Fifth Avenue		August 14, 1990
Junior League of the City of New York (Vincent Astor House)	130 East 80th Street		April 12, 1967
Otto H. Kahn House	1 East 91st Street		February 19, 1974
Kleeberg Residence	3 Riverside Drive and West 72nd Street 40°46′50.3″N 73°59′7.5″W		January 8, 1991
Knickerbocker Club Building	2 East 62nd Street		September 11, 1979
Majestic Apartments	115 Central Park West		March 8, 1988
Manhasset Apartments	2801-2825 Broadway; 301 West 108th Street; 300 West 109th Street (west side)		September 17, 1996
Manhattan House	200 East 66th Street		October 30, 2007
Hotel Marseilles	2689 Broadway & 103 Street 40°47′56.5″N 73°58′8″W		October 2, 1990
Master Building			December 5, 1989
Metropolitan Club Building			September 11, 1979
Metropolitan Museum of Art (Old Assay Office Facade)			June 9, 1967
Midtown Theater (Metro Theater)			July 11, 1989
Lewis G. Morris House (now the New World Foundation Building)	100 East 85th Street		April 19, 1973
Municipal Asphalt Plant			January 27, 1976
Museum of the City of New York			January 24, 1967

=== N – Z ===
Landmark Name	Address	Image	Date Designated
New-York Cab Company Stable 40°46′51″N 73°58′49″W	318-330 Amsterdam Avenue; 201-205 West 75th Street		November 14, 2006
New York Cancer Hospital (Towers Nursing Home)	455 Central Park West; 2 West 106th Street; 32 West 106th Street		August 17, 1976
New York Free Circulating Library, Bloomingdale Branch/Ukrainian Academy of Arts and Sciences	206 West 100th Street		August 29, 1989
New–York Historical Society	170 Central Park West		July 19, 1966
New York Public Library, Yorkville Branch	222 East 79th Street		January 24, 1967
New York Society for Ethical Culture	2 West 64th Street		July 23, 1974
New York Society Library	53 East 79th Street		February 15, 1967
Normandy Apartments 40°47′24″N 73°58′48″W	140 Riverside Drive at 86th Street		November 12, 1985
Park East Synagogue	163 East 67th Street		January 8, 1980
Payne Whitney House	972 Fifth Avenue		
Pomander Walk	265 West 94th Street		September 14, 1982
Prentiss Residence	1 Riverside Drive		January 8, 1991
Public School 72 (now Julia de Burgos Latino Cultural Center)	1674-1686 Lexington Avenue; 129-131 East 105th Street		June 25, 1996
Public School 109 (now El Barrio's Artspace PS109)	215 East 99th Street		March 27, 2018
Public School 166	132 West 89th Street		June 27, 2000
Queensboro Bridge			April 16, 1974
Red House	350 West 85th Street		September 14, 1982
Regis High School	55 East 84th Street		November 19, 1969
Isaac L. Rice and Julia B. Rice House (now Yeshiva Ketana of Manhattan)	346 West 89th Street		February 19, 1980
Sara Delano Roosevelt Memorial House	47-49 East 65th Street		September 25, 1973
Saint Cecilia's Church and Convent	112–120 East 106th Street		September 14, 1976 Church, Convent
Church of St. Ignatius Loyola	980 Park Avenue		March 4, 1969
St. Jean Baptiste Church	1067-1071 Lexington Avenue		November 19, 1969
St. Michael's Episcopal Church, Parish House and Rectory	West 99th Street and Amsterdam Avenue		April 12, 2016
St. Nicholas Russian Orthodox Cathedral	15 East 97th Street		December 18, 1973
Church of St. Paul and St. Andrew (St. Paul's Methodist Episcopal Church)			November 24, 1981
Church of St. Paul the Apostle			June 25, 2013
St. Vincent Ferrer Priory and School (including the Holy Name Society Building)	869 Lexington Avenue; 141-151 East 65th Street		May 19, 1981
San Remo Apartments	145-146 Central Park West		March 31, 1987
Schinasi House	351 Riverside Drive		March 19, 1974
Seventh Regiment Armory	643 Park Avenue		June 9, 1967
Congregation Shearith Israel (Spanish and Portuguese Synagogue)	8 West 70th Street		March 19, 1974
Shively Sanitary Tenements (East River Homes, Cherokee Apartments)	507-515 and 517-523 East 77th Street; 508-514 and 516-522 East 78th Street		July 9, 1985
Sidewalk Clock at 1501 3rd Avenue, Manhattan	1501 Third Avenue		August 25, 1981
Sidewalk Clock, 783 Fifth Avenue	783 Fifth Avenue		August 25, 1981
Henry T. Sloane Residence	9 East 72nd Street		January 11, 1977
Abigail Adams Smith House (Headquarters of the Colonial Dames of America; now the Mount Vernon Hotel Museum)	421 East 61st Street		January 24, 1967
Sofia Brothers Warehouse (Kent Automatic Parking Garage)	34-43 West 61st Street		April 12, 1983
Soldiers and Sailors Monument	Riverside Park opposite 89th Street		September 14, 1976
Spanish Institute (Oliver D. Filley House)	684 Park Avenue		November 10, 1970
Squadron A Armory, Madison Avenue Facade	Madison Avenue between 94th and 95th Streets		October 19, 1966
Sutphen Residence 40°46′49″N 73°59′6.7″W	311 West 72nd Street		January 8, 1991
John B. Trevor House (also known as the John B. and Caroline Trevor House)	11 East 91st Street 40°47′3.7″N 73°57′24.6″W		July 23, 1974
Trinity School and the former St. Agnes Parish House 40°47′26″N 73°58′17″W	121-147 West 91st Street		August 1, 1989
Mrs. Graham Fair Vanderbilt House	60 East 93rd Street		June 12, 1968
Gertrude Rhinelander Waldo House	867 Madison Avenue		July 13, 1976
Felix M. Warburg House	1109 Fifth Avenue		November 24, 1981
West End Collegiate Church and Collegiate School	West End Avenue and West 77th Street		January 11, 1967
West Park Presbyterian Church	65-167 West 86th Street; 541 Amsterdam Avenue		January 12, 2010
Payne Whitney House (Division of the French Embassy)	972 Fifth Avenue at 79th Street		September 15, 1970
Willard D. Straight House	1130 Fifth Avenue		May 15, 1968
Yorkville Bank Building 40°46′41.4″N 73°57′15″W	1511-1515 Third Avenue; 201-203 East 85th Street		June 12, 2012

== Interior Landmarks ==
Landmark name	Image	Date listed (Note: The number below each date is the number assigned to each location by the Landmarks Preservation Commission. The landmark designation report can be viewed by clicking the number.) (Note: For an interactive map, refer to "Discover New York City Landmarks". New York City Landmarks Preservation Commission – via ArcGIS.)	Location	Neighborhood	Description
IRT Subway System Underground Interior (72nd Street station)	IRT Subway System Underground Interior (72nd Street station)	October 23, 1979 (Note: Twelve subway stations are grouped under the "IRT Subway System Underground Interior" listing (LP-1096), but each station is listed here on its own. The 59th Street–Columbus Circle station is listed under List of New York City Designated Landmarks in Manhattan from 14th to 59th Streets.) (#1096)	Broadway and 72nd Street; 40°46′42″N 73°58′57″W	Upper West Side	Original interiors of a New York City Subway station built in 1904 and served by the 1, 2, and 3 trains; also a National Registered Historic Place.
IRT Subway System Underground Interior (79th Street station)	IRT Subway System Underground Interior (79th Street station)	October 23, 1979 (#1096)	Broadway and 79th Street; 40°47′01″N 73°58′50″W	Upper West Side	Original interiors of a New York City Subway station built in 1904 and served by the 1 train; also a National Registered Historic Place.
American Museum of Natural History (Memorial Hall interior)	American Museum of Natural History (Memorial Hall interior)	July 22, 1975 (#0889)	Central Park West and 77th Street; 40°46′53″N 73°58′28″W	Upper West Side	The main lobby of the American Museum of Natural History (an exterior landmark and a National Registered Historic Place), designed by John Russell Pope in 1929–1935.
Beacon Theater (outer and inner ticket lobbies, rotunda, and auditorium interior)	Beacon Theater (outer and inner ticket lobbies, rotunda, and auditorium interior)	December 11, 1979 (#1097)	2124 Broadway; 40°46′50″N 73°58′52″W	Upper West Side	Most of the Beacon Theatre (also a National Registered Historic Place), a Greek, Roman, Renaissance, and Rococo-style movie house designed by Walter W. Ahlschlager.
Central Savings Bank (entrance vestibules and foyers, banking hall, and mezzanine interior)	Central Savings Bank (entrance vestibules and foyers, banking hall, and mezzanine interior)	December 12, 1993 (#1804)	2100–2108 Broadway; 40°46′47″N 73°58′52″W	Upper West Side	Vestibule and banking hall of the Central Savings Bank Building (now Apple Bank for Savings, an exterior landmark and National Registered Historic Place).
(Former) Whitney Museum of American Art Interior	(Former) Whitney Museum of American Art Interior	May 20, 2025 (#2686)	945 Madison Avenue; 40°46′24″N 73°57′50″W	Upper East Side	Interiors of a building designed by Marcel Breuer and originally built for the Whitney Museum.
Metropolitan Museum of Art (main floor interior)	Metropolitan Museum of Art (main floor interior)	November 15, 1977 (#0972)	Fifth Avenue and 82nd Street; 40°46′44″N 73°57′47″W	Upper East Side	The main entrance vestibule, Great Hall, and stairways of the Metropolitan Museum of Art (an exterior landmark and National Historic Landmark), a major American art museum. This particular space was designed by Richard Morris Hunt in 1897–1902.
Seventh Regiment Armory	Seventh Regiment Armory	July 19, 1994 (#1884)	643 Park Avenue; 40°46′01″N 73°57′58″W	Upper East Side	Most of the interior of the Seventh Regiment Armory (an exterior landmark and National Historic Landmark), designed by Charles W. Clinton in the American Aesthetic style in the late 1870s.
Solomon R. Guggenheim Museum	Solomon R. Guggenheim Museum	August 14, 1990 (#1775)	1071 Fifth Avenue; 40°46′58″N 73°57′34″W	Upper East Side	Most of the interior of the Solomon R. Guggenheim Museum (an exterior landmark and National Historic Landmark), a major 20th-century interior space by Frank Lloyd Wright.

== Scenic Landmarks ==
Landmark Name	Image	Date Designated
Central Park		April 16, 1974
Riverside Park and Riverside Drive		January 22, 1980
Verdi Square		January 28, 1975

== See also ==
- List of New York City Designated Landmarks in Manhattan below 14th Street
- List of New York City Designated Landmarks in Manhattan from 14th to 59th Streets
- List of New York City Designated Landmarks in Manhattan above 110th Street
- List of New York City Designated Landmarks in Manhattan on Islands
- National Register of Historic Places listings in Manhattan from 59th to 110th Streets
- List of National Historic Landmarks in New York City
