= 1261 Madison Avenue =

Apartment building in Manhattan, New York

- Apartment at 1261 Madison Avenue
- U.S. National Register of Historic Places
- New York State Register of Historic Places
- New York City Landmark

- Location within Manhattan Location within New York City Location within New York
- Location: 1261 Madison Ave., New York, New York
- Coordinates: 40°47′00″N 73°57′24″W
- Area: less than one acre
- Built: 1900
- Architect: Buchman & Fox
- Architectural style: Beaux Arts, Second Empire
- NRHP reference No.: 82001185
- NYSRHP No.: 06101.001750
- NYCL No.: 0865

Significant dates
- Added to NRHP: 1982-10-29
- Designated NYSRHP: 1982-09-22
- Designated NYCL: 1974-07-23

1261 Madison Avenue is an apartment building on the Upper East Side of Manhattan in New York City, New York, US. It was built between 1900 and 1901 and was designed by the firm of Buchman & Fox. The building is one of a few luxury apartment buildings that were developed in the surrounding area prior to World War I. It is a New York City designated landmark and is listed on the National Register of Historic Places.

== Description ==
1261 Madison Avenue is at the northeast corner of Madison Avenue and 90th Street in the Upper East Side of Manhattan in New York City, New York, US, within the Carnegie Hill neighborhood. The building has a frontage, or width, of 62 feet (19 m) along 90th Street to the south, and 100 feet (30 m) along Madison Avenue to the west. The building was designed by Buchman & Fox in the Beaux-Arts style for the real-estate developer Gilbert Brown. The building measures seven stories high. It is surrounded by alleyways to the north and east, making the structure entirely freestanding. The outermost bays on Madison Avenue protrude from the rest of the facade.

On Madison Avenue and 90th Street, the first and second stories have a rusticated limestone facade. The first story additionally contains a grand entrance on Madison Avenue, with a short of steps ascending a molded door frame. There are rusticated pilasters on either side of steps, along with brackets; a broken pediment above the doorway surrounds a volute with the number "1261" inside it. The AIA Guide to New York City praised the building's "monumental broken pediment" as the main architectural feature of the building's otherwise nondescript facade. Above the broken pediment, on the second floor, is a marble medallion surrounded by a cartouche.

The third through fifth stories have a smooth limestone facade. On these stories, the fourth-story and fifth-story window frames are flanked by quoins (which form a key motif), and the spandrel panels below these stories are carved. On the fifth story, the outermost bay on Madison Avenue have cartouches above an arched opening, and there are console brackets above these windows. On both elevations of the facade, a cornice runs horizontally above the fifth story, with modillions beneath them and an iron balcony above. Within the outer bays on Madison Avenue, the protruding sixth- and seventh-story windows are flanked by double-height pilasters, and there are round pediments above the seventh story. On the rest of the facade, the rectangular sixth-story windows are topped by frieze panels, and there is a string course running horizontally above that story. The seventh-story windows project from the mansard roof and are topped by curved pediments with various carved ornamentation.

== History ==
The construction of the nearby Andrew Carnegie Mansion in the late 1890s spurred large amounts of high-end development in the neighborhood, including several houses and an apartment building at 1291 Madison Avenue. In 1923, the developer George Kean bought the building from Bing & Bing. Robert W. Dowling's firm, the City Investing Company, bought the building in 1946; at the time, Dowling also owned the other buildings on the east side of Madison Avenue extending north to 91st Street. In 1950, Dowling sold the building to the 1261 Madison Avenue Corporation, a housing cooperative composed of the 16 families who lived there.

== See also ==
- List of New York City Designated Landmarks in Manhattan from 59th to 110th Streets
- National Register of Historic Places listings in Manhattan from 59th to 110th Streets
