= The Manhasset =

Residential building in Manhattan, New York

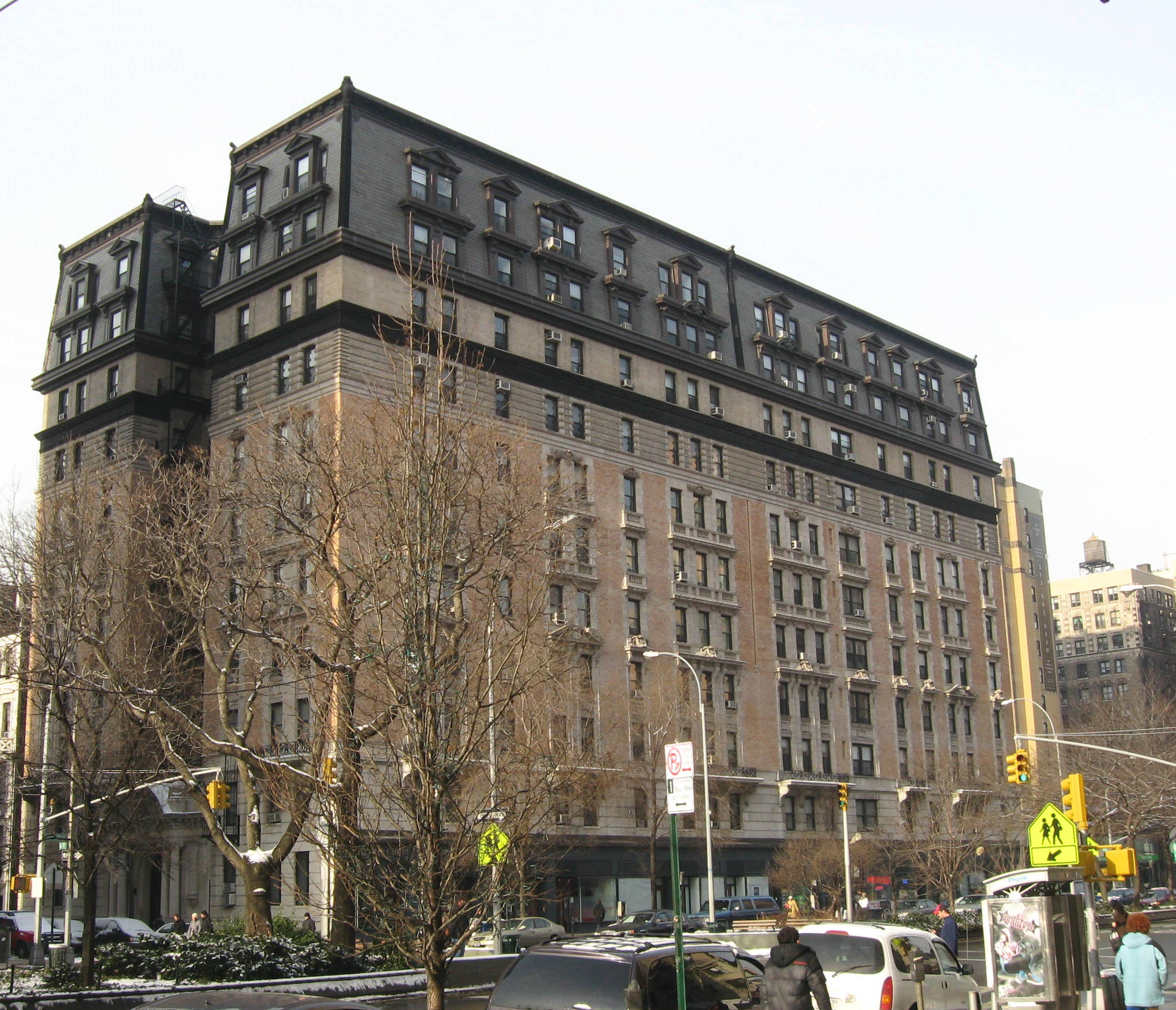
- Interactive map of the The Manhasset area

General information
- Architectural style: Beaux-Arts
- Location: 2801–2825 Broadway, 301 West 108th Street, and 300 West 109th Street, New York, NY, 10025, United States
- Coordinates: 40°48′12″N 73°58′04″W
- Construction started: 1899
- Opening: 1905

Technical details
- Floor count: 11

Design and construction
- Architects: Joseph Wolf and Janes & Leo
- Developer: William Noble & Co.

Other information
- Number of units: 136

New York City Landmark
- Designated: September 17, 1996
- Reference no.: 1947

The Manhasset is a residential building on the western side of Broadway, between 108th and 109th streets, on the Upper West Side of Manhattan in New York City, New York. Constructed between 1899 and 1905 as one of several apartment hotels along Broadway on the Upper West Side, the Manhasset was designed in the Beaux-Arts style and was split into northern and southern halves. The lowest eight stories of the 11-story building were designed by Joseph Wolf, while the top three stories were designed by the firm of Janes & Leo. The building is a New York City designated landmark.

The base is two stories high and is clad with rusticated limestone blocks; it has entrances on 108th and 109th streets, as well as storefronts on Broadway. The central section of the facade is largely made of salmon brick, with ornamentation made of architectural terracotta. There are exterior light courts facing north, south, and west. The structure is topped by a two-story mansard roof. As built, the Manhasset had 77 apartments spread across the northern and southern sections; following a 1939 renovation, the building has had 136 apartments.

The Manhasset was developed by John W. and William Noble, who acquired the site in 1899 but were unable to complete the structure. Although the Manhasset was built as an eight-story edifice, Jacob Butler expanded it to 11 stories after taking over the development in 1901. The building was finished in 1905, and the Butler family retained it until 1909. Storefronts were added to the ground floor in 1910, and the Manhasset was sold several more times over the years. The Mutual Life Insurance Company, which acquired the Manhasset in 1932, subdivided the apartments between 1939 and 1940. The Heller family acquired the Manhasset during the late 20th century and converted the apartments into a housing cooperative in 1993, retaining ownership of the retail condominium at the building's base. After undergoing a renovation in the late 1990s, the Manhasset was damaged by a fire in 1999.

== Site ==
The Manhasset is located at 2801–2825 Broadway, on the western sidewalk between 108th and 109th streets, on the Upper West Side of Manhattan in New York City. It occupies the eastern end of the city block bounded by Broadway to the east, 108th Street to the north, Riverside Drive to the west, and 108th Street to the south. The rectangular land lot covers 20,183 ft^{2} (1,875.1 m^{2}), with a frontage of 201.83 feet (62 m) on Broadway and 100 feet (30 m) on the side streets. Nearby buildings include the Schinasi Mansion and Nicholas Roerich Museum one block southwest, the Ramath Orah synagogue one block north, and the Cathedral of St. John the Divine two blocks northeast. In addition, the New York City Subway's Cathedral Parkway–110th Street station is one block to the north.

== Architecture ==
The Manhasset is composed of two conjoined structures, each 11 stories tall. The lowest eight stories were designed by Joseph Wolf, while the top three stories were designed by the firm of Janes & Leo. Both structures were designed in the Beaux-Arts style.

=== Facade ===
All elevations of the building's facade are divided horizontally into three sections: a base, midsection, and capital. The base is two stories high and is clad with rusticated blocks of limestone; it is topped by a horizontal belt course above the second story. On the northern and southern elevations, the base also contains bands of rock-faced limestone. The midsection runs from the third to ninth story and is composed largely of salmon-colored bricks. On the third to seventh stories, the corners of the building contain curved bricks, and there are terracotta decorations around the windows. The eighth story also has terracotta window frames, and there are cornices above the seventh, eighth, and ninth stories. The tenth and eleventh floors are within a steep mansard roof and contain metal dormer windows. The southern elevation on 108th Street and the northern elevation on 109th Street both include an entrance and a deep light court, though the entrance on 108th Street is more elaborate.

==== Broadway ====
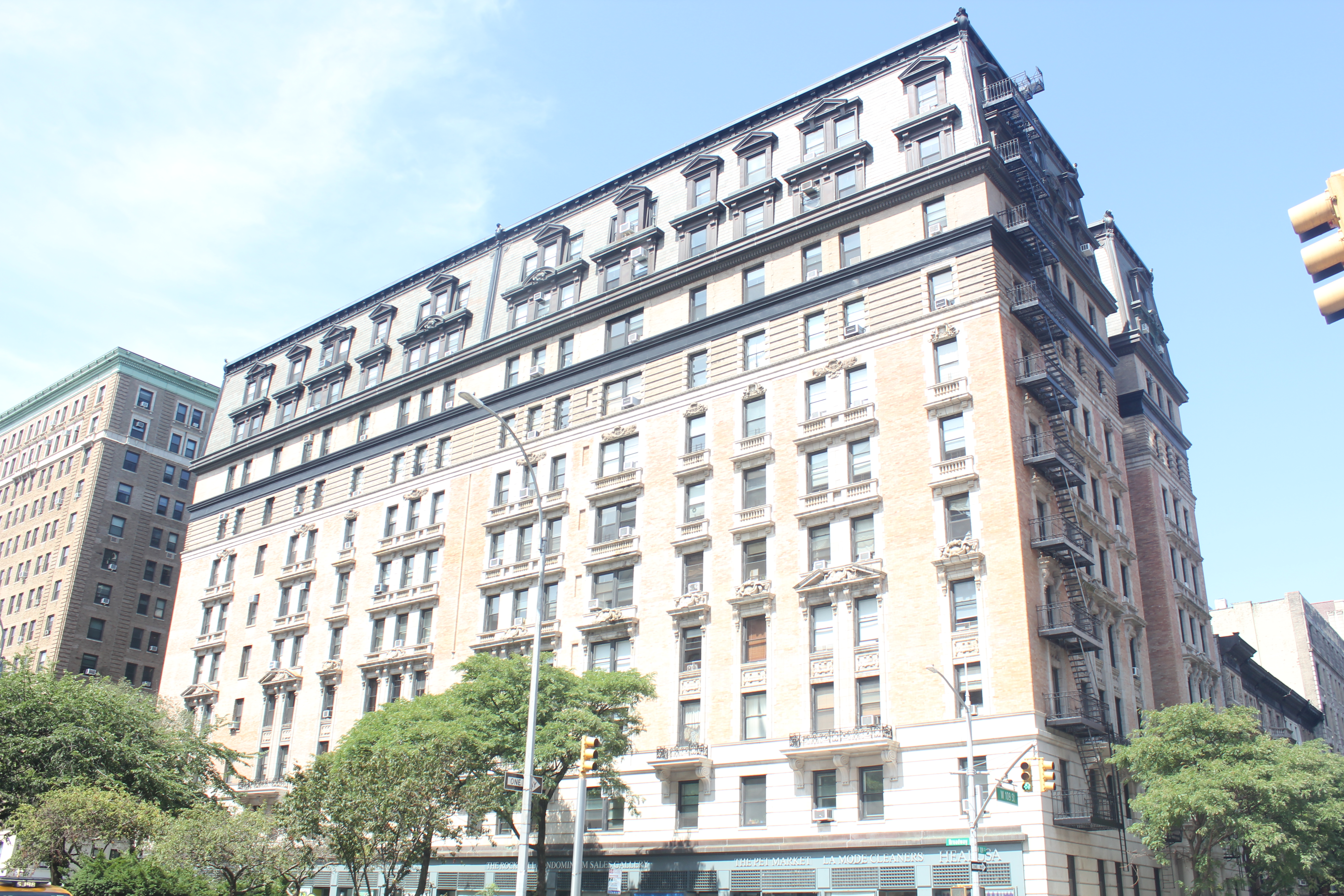
The Broadway facade as seen from 109th Street

Both halves of the Manhasset share a facade along Broadway to the east, but the southern and northern sections of the eastern facade are not symmetrical. The lack of symmetry is because the apartments in the southern half of the building were originally larger than those in the northern half. The two sections are visually separated by a shallow notch between the fifth and seventh stories, as well as a vertical bar in the mansard roof. From left to right, the Broadway facade is divided vertically into 11 bays, each with a different number of windows. As counted from south to north, bays 2, 4, 8, 9, and 11 have one window per story; bays 1, 3, and 10 have two windows per story; bays 5 and 6 have three windows per story; and bay 7 has one double-width window on each story. On the third to eighth stories, there is a party wall between bays 6 and 7, which is delineated by blind openings.

Above the storefronts is an egg-and-dart molding, which remains largely in place; rectangular signs with anthemia were originally placed over each storefront below the molding, but only one of these signs survives. The second-story windows are all recessed into the facade. There are brackets on either side of the second-story windows in bays 1, 3, 5, 6, 8, and 10, which support balconies with iron railings on the third story of these bays. Within the third to seventh stories, each bay is placed within its own terracotta frame; the decorations largely remain in place except for the second bay, where all the window sills and lintels have been removed. There are terracotta panels above the third-story windows. On the fourth story, bays 1, 3, and 10 are topped by broken pediments with cartouches; bays 4, 7–9, and 11 are topped by lintels with cartouches and brackets; and bays 5 and 6 are topped by lintels with brackets only. There are balustrades in front of the fifth-story windows in bays 5 and 6, as well as in front of most of the sixth-story and seventh-story windows. In addition, there are cartouches above the seventh story windows.

The facade of the eighth and ninth floors is clad with brick, and the windows on these stories are arranged similarly to those on the floors below. The eighth-floor windows have terracotta surrounds, and the corners of the facade on that floor contain brick quoins. The ninth-floor windows are surrounded by bricks in a keyed pattern. The top two stories are within the mansard roof, which is steep and contains metal dormers. The tenth-floor dormers are flanked by panels with foliate patterns and are topped by lintels with brackets. The dormer windows in the triple-width bays 5 and 6 have segmentally-arched pediments that are decorated with cartouches. The eleventh-floor dormers are topped by triangular pediments. On the eleventh story, only the central window panes in bays 5 and 6 have frames and pediments, while the double-width bay 7 has one central pane with a pediment, which is flanked by two smaller panes without pediments.

==== Side elevations ====
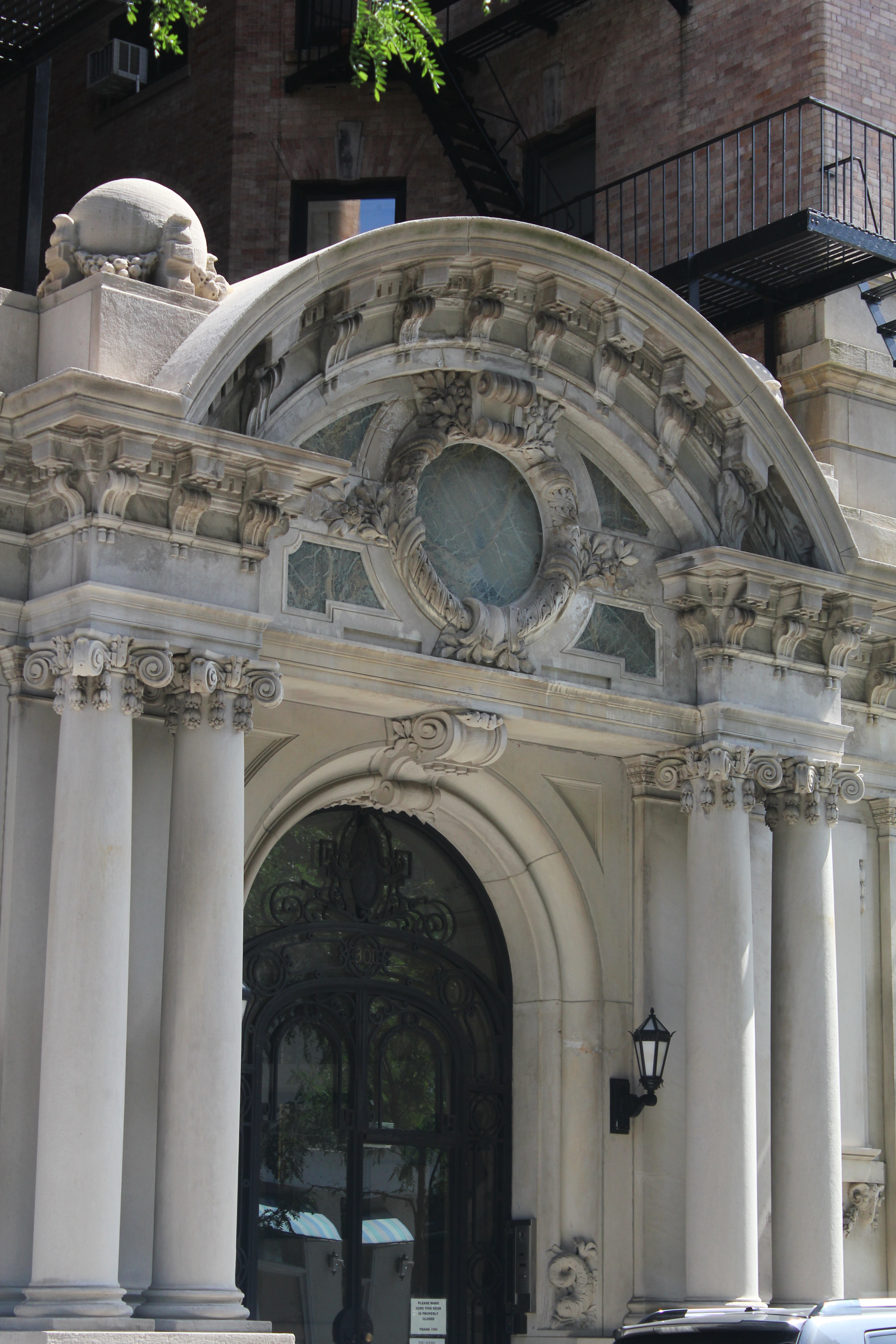
The 108th Street entrance

On 108th Street, the entrance pavilion is through a round arch, which has glass-and-iron double doors beneath a fanlight. The bottom of the archway's extrados contains carvings of seaweed and dolphins, while the pinnacle is decorated with an ornamental keystone. On either side of the arch are two protruding Ionic columns, which stand in front of two Doric pilasters. Adjoining each set of pilasters are stone panels with rams' heads and garlands, followed by an outer pilaster. Atop the entrance pavilion is a cornice with brackets; this cornice continues along a segmental arch that rises above the doorway. The tympanum below the arch includes a marble roundel with stone garlands, in addition to four more marble panels. A light court rises above the entrance pavilion, dividing the 108th Street elevation into two symmetrical wings; each wing has a single-width inner bay and a double-width outer bay. The decorations of the wings are similar to those on the Broadway elevations. The light court has a plain facade with fire escapes, and the western and eastern walls of the light court shift slightly inward at the light court's north end.

On 109th Street, the entrance pavilion is slightly less ornate, though similar to the 108th Street pavilion. The arch is flanked by two Doric pilasters and Ionic columns on each side, which support a segmental arch with a marble tympanum, similar to on 108th Street. However, the 109th Street entrance lacks the stone panels and outer pilasters found on the 108th Street elevation. Also unlike on 108th Street, the two wings are not symmetrical; the western wing contains one triple-width bay, while the eastern wing contains one triple-width bay flanked by single-width bays. The light court on 109th Street contains fire escapes as well.

To the west, the facade is largely made of plain beige brick, except for the portions of the facade closest to 108th and 109th streets. The southernmost and northernmost bays of the western elevation are designed similarly to the other three elevations, with a mansard roof on the tenth and eleventh stories. There is also a rear courtyard facing the west.

=== Features ===
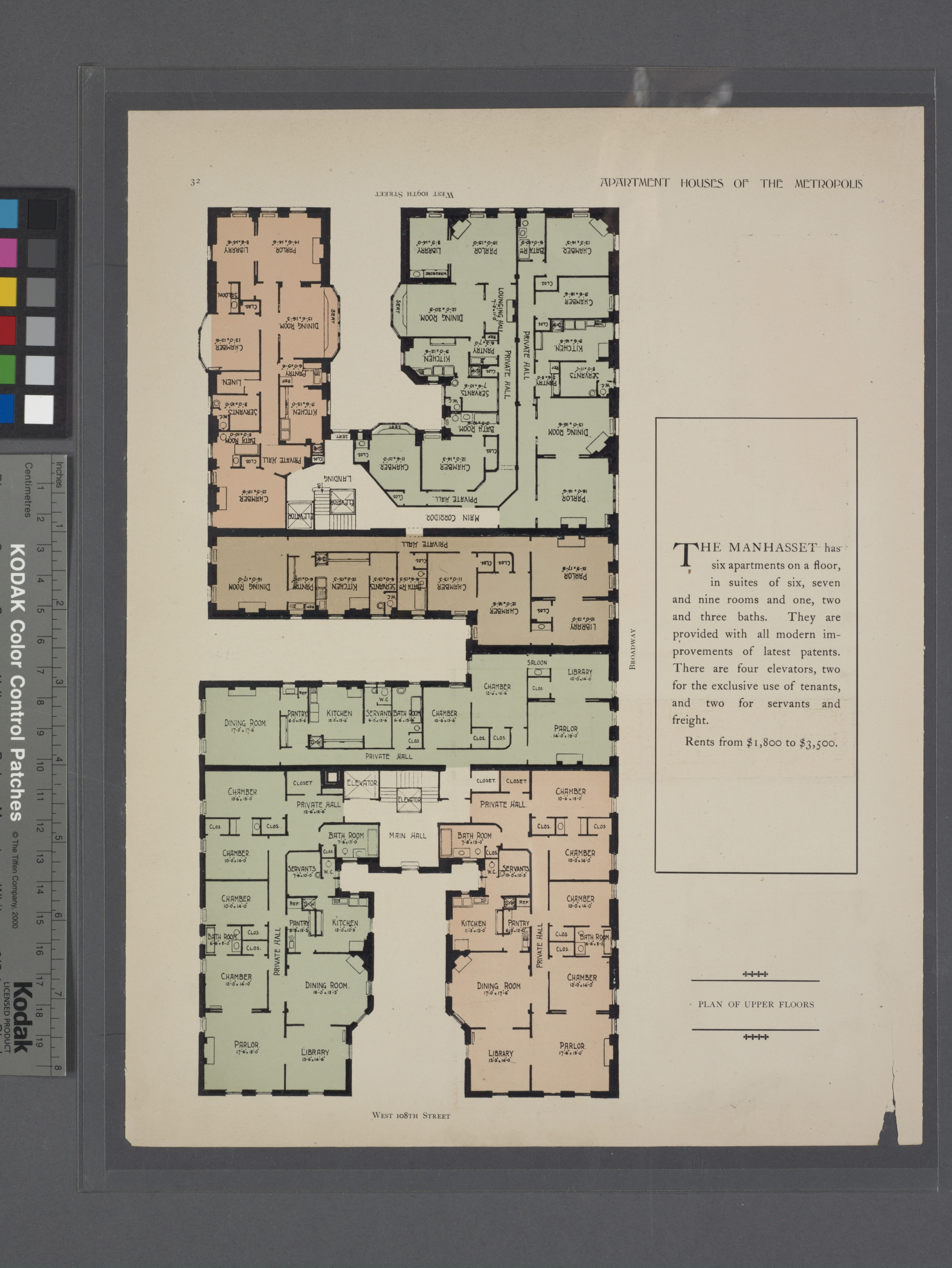
The original floor plan of the upper stories

As built, the structure had 77 apartments spread across two sections. The southern portion of the Manhasset, on 108th Street, had 33 units, while the northern portion on 109th Street had 44 units. In the southern half of the building, each story had three apartments, which were larger than the units in the northern half. Within the northern portion of the building, each story had four two-bedroom apartments. Following a 1939 renovation, the building has had 136 apartments, which contain decorations such as glass-block walls. The lobbies were also redecorated in the Art Moderne style as part of the 1939 refurbishment.

== History ==
During the early 19th century, apartment developments in the city were generally associated with the working class. By the late 19th century, apartment hotels were becoming desirable among the middle and upper classes. Between 1880 and 1885, more than ninety apartment buildings were developed in the city. The city's first subway line was developed under the adjacent section of Broadway starting in the late 1890s, and it opened in 1904 with a station at Broadway and 110th Street. The construction of the subway spurred the development of high-rise apartment buildings on Broadway. Several apartment hotels had been built along Broadway in advance of the subway's opening, including the Belleclaire, Ansonia, and Marseilles to the south.

=== Development ===
In the two years before the Manhasset was constructed, the sites on the western side of Broadway between 108th and 109th streets were resold four times. The last such sale took place in May 1899, when Jacob D. Butler sold the site to John W. and William Noble. That July, William Noble & Co. filed plans for two separate apartment houses on the site, one each facing 108th and 109th streets. Both structures were to be known collectively as "Court Grenoble"; the building on 108th Street was to include three apartments per floor, while the structure on 109th Street would include four units per floor. The 109th Street structure was to have 33 apartments, while the 108th Street structure was to have 25 apartments. Both structures were to be eight stories tall, the maximum height allowed for apartment buildings in New York City at the time. The structures were to have brick and stone facades in addition to flat roofs, and they would be designed in the Beaux-Arts style. Butler anticipated that the structures would cost a total of $800,000.

Work on the Grenoble began later in 1899, and John W. Noble Jr. received $618,463 worth of mortgage loans on the site in December. William Noble had declared bankruptcy shortly before the building's construction, having acquired the unprofitable New York Mercury newspaper. Because of this, Noble had to pay back $1 million in debts even as the building was being erected. John Noble Jr. obtained a $500,000 mortgage loan from the Knickerbocker Trust Company in May 1900. By the following year, the original structures were virtually complete, but none of the apartments had been leased out yet. The building went into foreclosure in September 1901, and Jacob D. Butler took back control of the site at an auction that month, paying $521,431.

Shortly after taking over the building, Butler announced in February 1902 that he would erect three additional stories and a roof garden. Butler hired the firm of Janes & Leo to design the expansion. At the time, the city government had just passed legislation allowing the construction of apartments up to 15 stories high. In addition, firm had just completed two other structures on Broadway: the Dorilton and the Alimar. The additions also included entrance pavilions on both of the side streets, a deeper light court on 109th Street, and a two-story mansard roof on the tenth and eleventh stories. In 1903, the contractor William Henderson received the contract to construct the three-story annex. By then, the structure was known as the Manhasset. The next year, the Manhasset Realty Corporation received a $750,090 mortgage loan from the Metropolitan Life Insurance Company, and the developers obtained two additional mortgages worth $150,000.

=== Early and mid-20th century ===
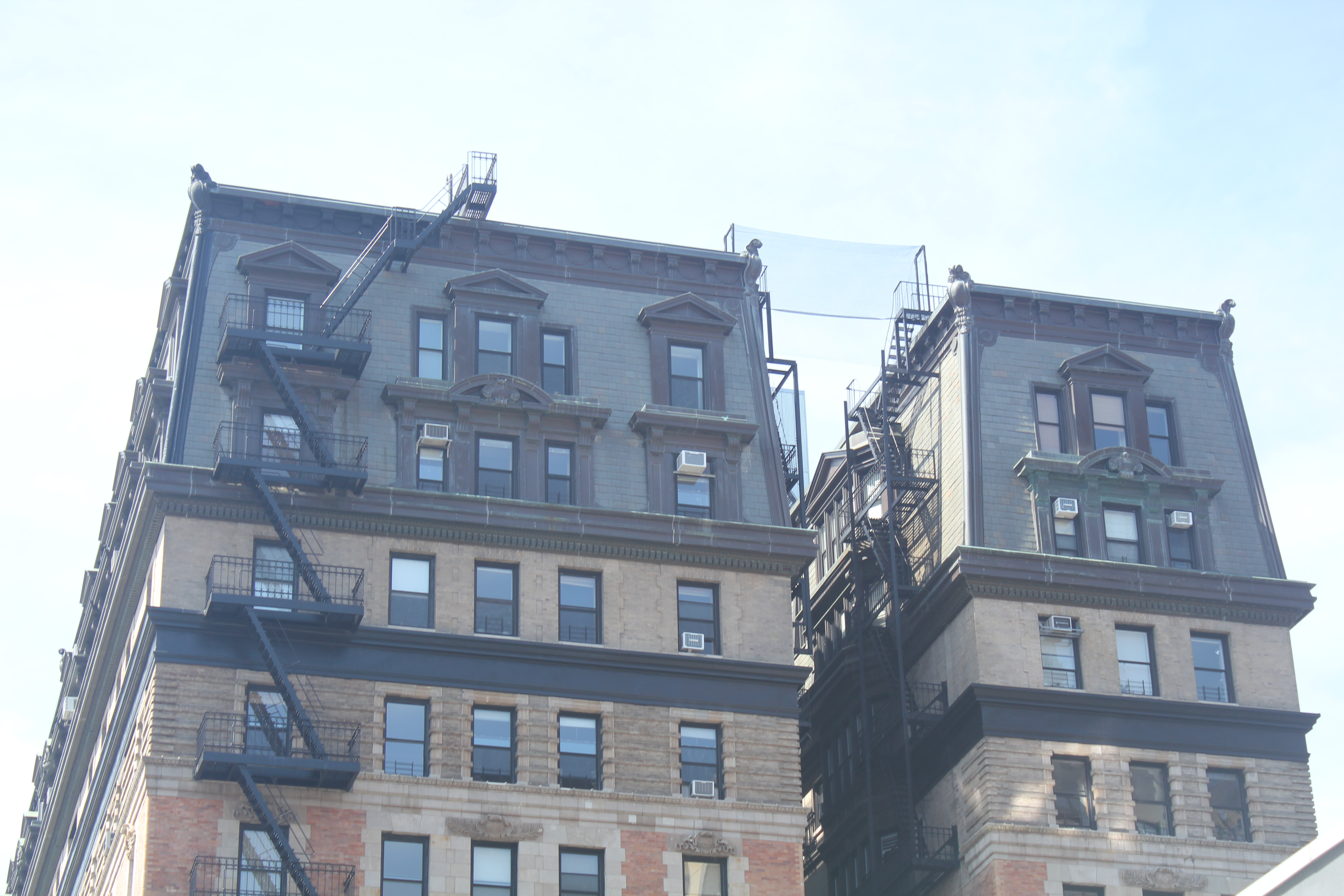
The upper stories of the 109th Street facade, which are asymmetrical

The Manhasset was completed by early 1905. A state census conducted in June 1905 found that 13 apartments on 108th Street, as well as 25 apartments on 109th Street, were occupied. The apartments originally had between six and nine rooms, which were rented for up to $3,500 annually. There were originally no stores on the ground story, and an areaway separated the sidewalk from the apartments on the ground floor. At the time, Broadway was rapidly becoming a commercial thoroughfare, particularly because of the subway's opening, and contemporary buildings such as the Belnord and the Apthorp had storefronts. In 1908, the Manhasset was placed for sale after the owners defaulted on $488,000 worth of mortgage loans. Carrie M. Butler, Jacob Butler's wife, bought the building that July, bidding $1.3 million. Additional residents continued to move in during the 1910s.

Carrie Butler sold the building in January 1910 to the Realty Assets Company for approximately $3 million, and the new owners appointed Mark Rafalsky & Co. as the leasing agents. The new owners also hired the architect Clarence S. Shumway to redesign the interiors of both the 108th and 109th Street structures for $31,000 each. These modifications included the addition of 14 storefronts on the ground level, which each measured 95 feet (29 m) deep. The areaway on Broadway was also removed, and Rafalsky was leasing out the storefronts by December 1910. The American Real Estate Company owned the building until March 1919, when they sold the structure to a syndicate led by Gilbert & Kramer at an estimated cost of $1.3 million. By then, the building was recorded as having 12 storefronts, and there were plans to subdivide the remaining apartments in the building. Frank N. Hoffstot acquired the Manhasset that May.

The Manhasset remained fully occupied through the 1920s. The real estate investor Samuel Brener bought the building in March 1925, at which point it was valued at $1.9 million. Sources disagree on whether the building had 70 or 82 apartments at the time. Two seven-room apartments in the building had already been split into smaller apartments by the early 1930s. The building again went into foreclosure in 1932, and the Mutual Life Insurance Company of New York took over the building that August, paying $50,000. By the late 1930s, there was no longer high demand for large apartments like those at the Manhasset. As such, in 1939, Mutual Life hired Archibald D. Anstey to subdivide all of the apartments, a project that cost $180,000. The lobbies were also redesigned. The renovations were completed in 1940; following these changes, the Manhasset had 136 apartments. Mutual Life sold the Manhasset in 1941 to the 137 Riverside Drive Corporation, and the building remained a rental structure for the next half-century.

=== Late 20th century to present ===
The Heller family acquired the Manhasset during the late 20th century. By then, there was a Spanish-Cuban restaurant called La Rosita inside the building. The New York City Landmarks Preservation Commission (LPC) began considering the possibility of protecting the Manhasset as an official city landmark in 1988. The Hellers converted the apartments into a housing cooperative in 1993, retaining ownership of the retail condominium at the building's base. The LPC ultimately designated the Manhasset as a city landmark in 1996, shortly before the architect Kevin Bone submitted plans for repairs to the building's roof. Bone, whose workers observed large holes in the cornice, later reflected that "the pigeon population was so heavy we were carrying fleas back to the office". In the late 1990s, the building's owners spent $6 million repairing the roof, pouring concrete floor slabs, and cleaning the facade. At the time, the building had 134 apartments. Half were controlled by shareholders in the cooperative, while the other half were rented out as market rate or semi-rent-regulated housing.

The Manhasset Apartments was severely damaged on March 11, 1999, when a fire started in a Mexican restaurant at ground level before spreading to the upper stories via an air shaft. The fire, which injured 33 to 35 people, was the most serious fire to take place in New York City since the Hotel St. George fire of 1995. At the time of the blaze, the building's renovation was nearly completed, and the residents included elderly people and middle-income professionals. The apartments at the northern end of the building experienced the most damage. Following the conflagration, all of the Manhasset's residents were temporarily relocated, and a guard was stationed around the building. The Manhasset's co-op board predicted that it would cost $30 million to fix up the building; at the time, the board had taken out a $160 million insurance policy from Liberty Mutual. In the 21st century, the Manhasset's residents have included the director Arliss Howard and his wife, the actress Debra Winger.

== See also ==
- List of buildings and structures on Broadway in Manhattan
- List of New York City Designated Landmarks in Manhattan from 59th to 110th Streets
