= Riverside–West 105th Street Historic District =

Historic district in Manhattan, New York

- U.S. National Register of Historic Places
- U.S. Historic district
- New York State Register of Historic Places
- New York City Landmark
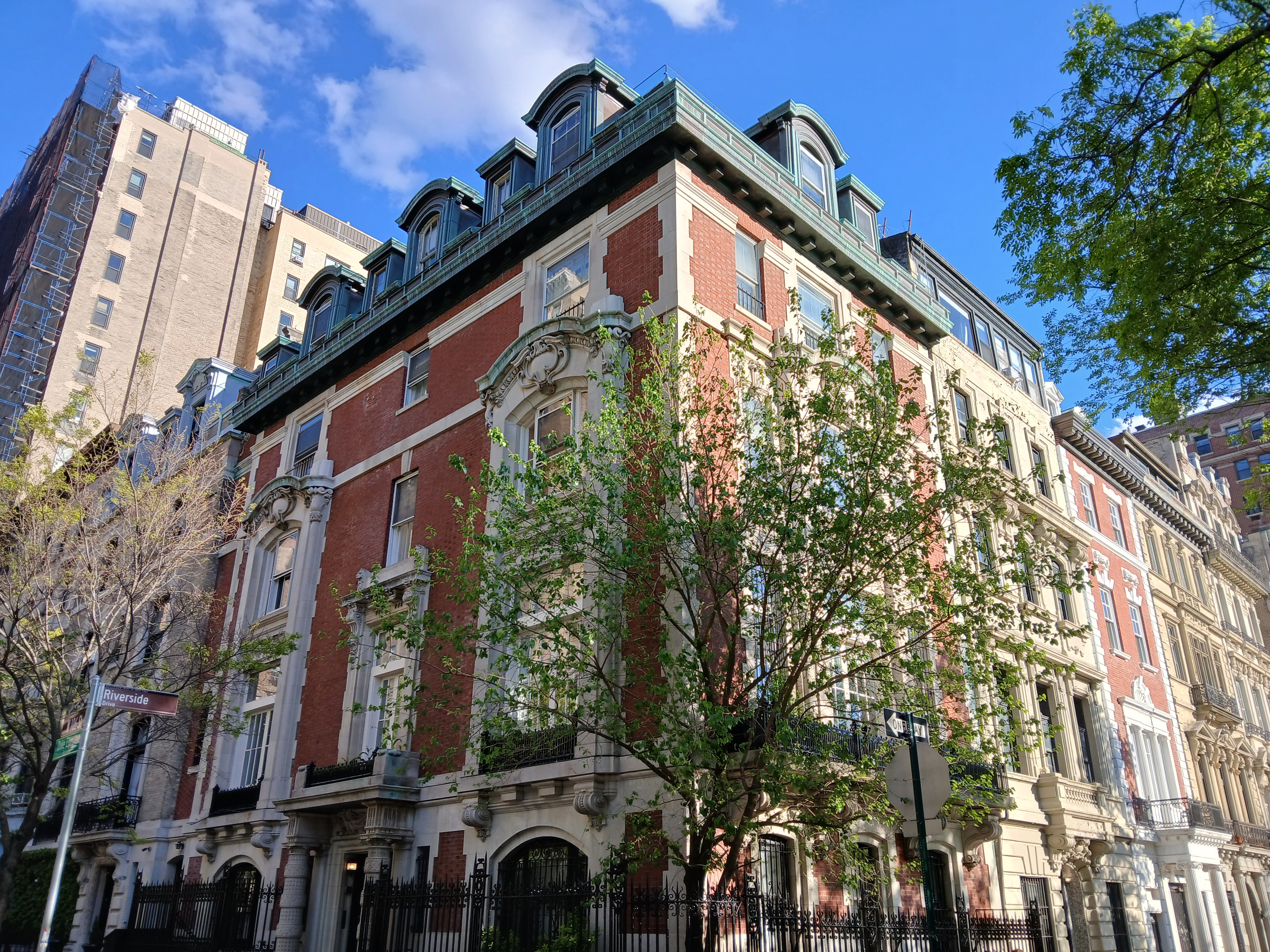
- 337 Riverside Drive, a building in the district

- Location within Manhattan Location within New York City Location within New York Location within the United States
- Location: Roughly bounded by Riverside Dr., W. 105th and W. 106th Sts., Manhattan, New York, US
- Coordinates: 40°48′7″N 73°58′12″W
- Area: 2 acres (0.81 ha)
- Built: 1899
- Architect: Janes & Leo, Mowbray & Uffinger, Hoppin & Koen, and Robert D. Kohn
- Architectural style: Beaux Arts
- NRHP reference No.: 80002712
- NYCL No.: 0323

Significant dates
- Added to NRHP: August 19, 1980
- Designated NYSRHP: February 28, 1980
- Designated NYCL: April 19, 1973

The Riverside–West 105th Street Historic District is a historic district on the Upper West Side of Manhattan in New York City, New York, US. The district comprises a series of rowhouses on Riverside Drive between 105th and 106th streets, as well as some rowhouses on an adjacent block of 105th Street. The district is both listed on the National Register of Historic Places (NRHP) and designated by the New York City Landmarks Preservation Commission.

The houses were all built between 1899 and 1902 by four local developers. Design was carried out by four architects: Janes & Leo, Mowbray & Uffinger, Hoppin & Koen, and Robert D. Kohn. The buildings were all built in the Beaux-Arts style and are mostly 4 stories high, with limestone and brick facades. The size and scale of the houses was limited by a restrictive covenant that existed at the time of their construction. The designs were intended to attract well-off residents of other parts of the Upper West Side, but the area had become rundown by the 1930s. Most of the district's buildings remained fully intact through the 20th century and were designated as city and NRHP landmarks in the latter part of the century.

== Description ==
The Riverside–West 105th Street Historic District is a small residential historic district on the Upper West Side of Manhattan in New York City, New York, US. The district is listed on the National Register of Historic Places (NRHP) and designated by the New York City Landmarks Preservation Commission; the national and city designations fully overlap. It encompasses 30 rowhouses or townhouses in an "L"-shaped area extending north along Riverside Drive and east along 105th Street. The rowhouses are situated on both sides of 105th Street, the east side of Riverside Drive, and the south side of 106th Street (one block north). All of the buildings are contributing properties to the NRHP district, except for 332 Riverside Drive, a Buddhist temple that replaced one of the original houses there. The houses were mostly built as single-family residences but have largely been divided into apartments.

The size and scale of the houses was limited by a restrictive covenant that existed at the time of their construction. The buildings were all built in the Beaux-Arts style and are mostly four stories high, with limestone facades. The houses also incorporate Edwardian elements. Some of the houses have brick facades trimmed with limestone. On 105th Street, the houses generally have horizontally-oriented balconies, cornices, and mansard roofs. Houses on Riverside Drive and 106th Street are slightly taller but have similar design details to the houses on 106th Street. Some of the houses have curved bays.

Design was carried out by four architects: Janes & Leo, Mowbray & Uffinger, Hoppin & Koen, and Robert D. Kohn. The firm of Janes & Leo designed the houses at 330–333 Riverside Drive, along with odd-numbered addresses at 301–307 West 105th Street and even-numbered addresses at 302–320 West 105th Street. Mowbray & Uffinger designed the odd-numbered addresses at 309–321 West 105th Street. The houses at 334–336 Riverside Drive were by Hoppin & Koen, while those at 337 Riverside Drive and 322 West 106th Street were by Kohn. Due to the architectural styles, the Riverside–West 105th Street Historic District is sometimes nicknamed "Paris on the Hudson", in reference to the nearby Hudson River. The seven remaining homes on 330–337 Riverside Drive have been nicknamed the Seven Beauties. The houses are sometimes shown on architectural tours of the neighborhood.

Developers and architects
Address numbers	Location	Developer	Architect
301–307 West 105th Street (odd)	North side of 105th Street	Hamilton M. Weed	Janes & Leo
302–320 West 105th Street (even)	South side of 105th Street	John C. Umberfield	Janes & Leo
309–321 West 105th Street (odd)	North side of 105th Street	John C. Umberfield	Mowbray & Uffinger
330–333 Riverside Drive (Note: The same team worked on the original (now-demolished) 332 Riverside Drive.)	East side of Riverside Drive	Joseph A. Farley	Janes & Leo
334–336 Riverside Drive	East side of Riverside Drive	Stewart & Smith	Hoppin & Koen
337 Riverside Drive	East side of Riverside Drive	Stewart & Smith	Robert D. Kohn
322 West 106th Street	South side of 106th Street	Stewart & Smith	Robert D. Kohn

=== Building details ===
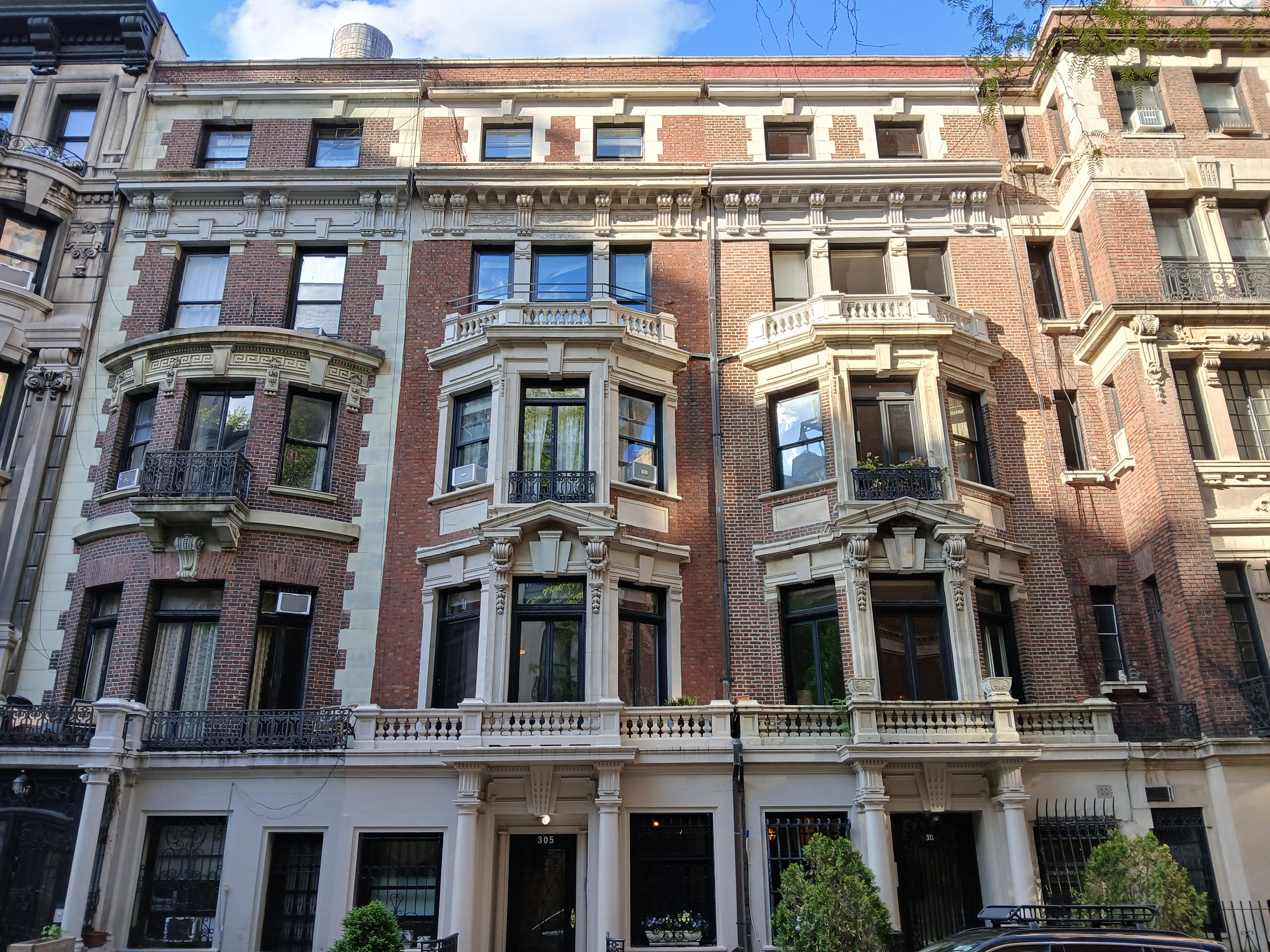
The brick buildings at 301–307 West 105th Street

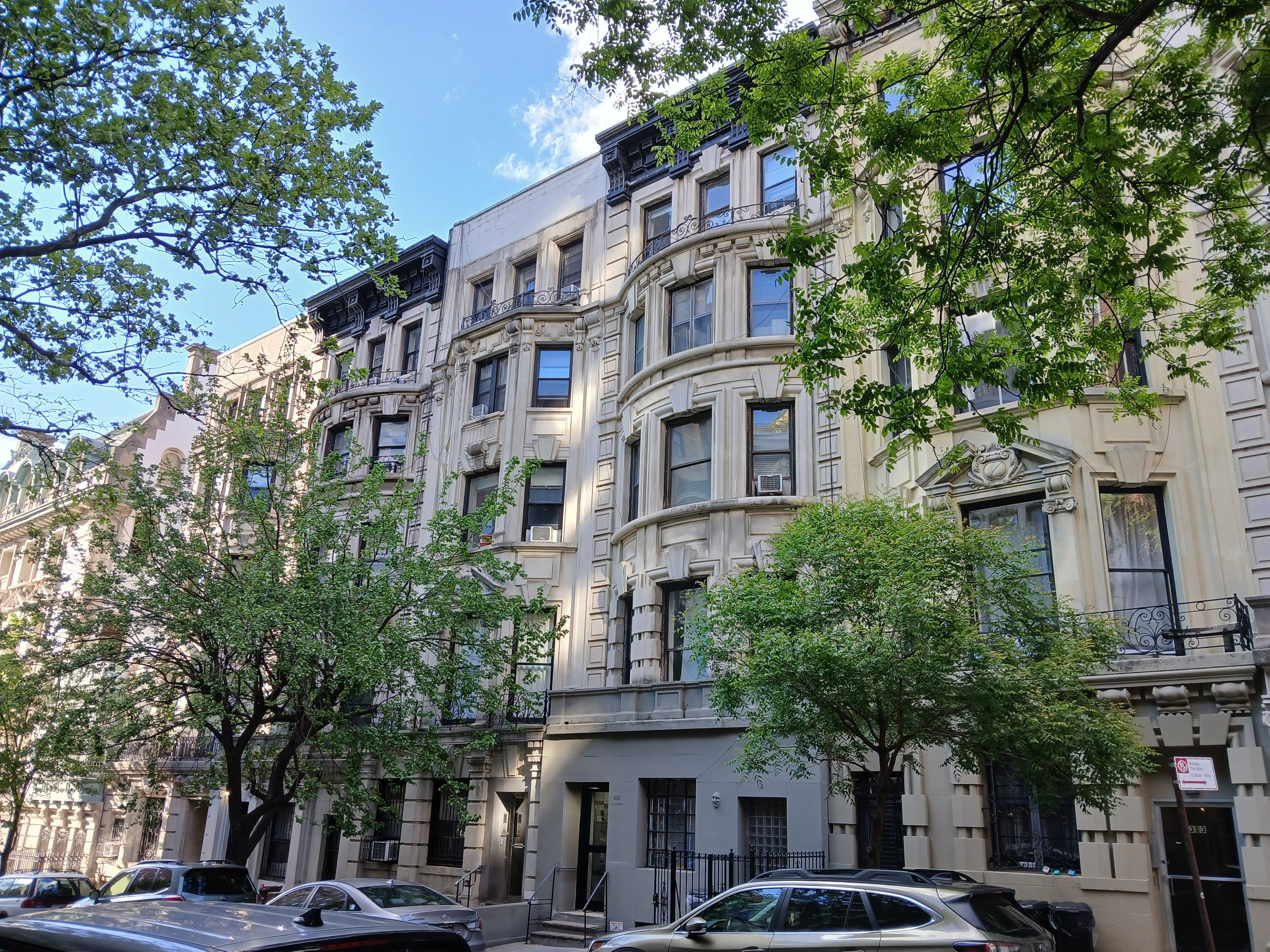
Some of the stone buildings at 309–321 West 105th Street

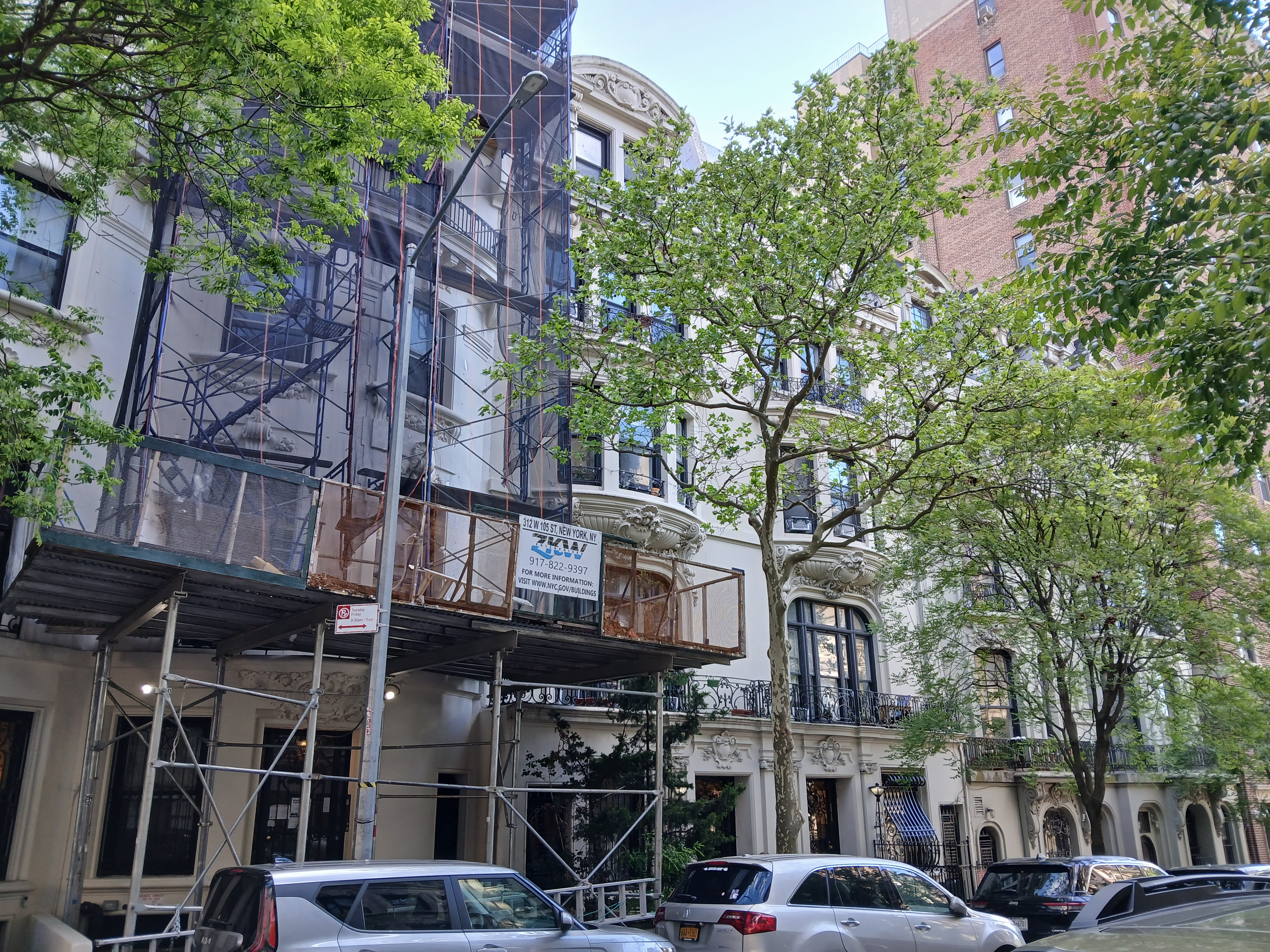
Some of the stone buildings at 302–320 West 105th Street

Janes & Leo were the sole architects of the ten buildings at 302–320 West 105th Street, on the south side of 105th Street. These buildings are grouped into five pairs, which have one of three general designs and are all made of stone with mansard roofs. The outermost pairs of houses, at 302–304 and 318–320 West 105th Street, generally have symmetrical first-floor doorways flanked by arched windows; elaborate brackets supporting second-floor balconies; bowed or curved fronts with pilasters in the Ionic order. The second-outermost pairs, at numbers 306–308 and 314–316, have asymmetrical first-floor doors with Ionic pilasters and cartouches above; second-floor iron railings; and elaborate third-floor oriel windows with corbels. The innermost pair, numbers 310–312, have three-story high bowed fronts with decorated pilasters on the third floor, along with elaborate broken pediments on the fourth floor.

On the north side of 105th Street, Janes & Leo also designed four buildings at 301–307 West 105th Street, which have brick fronts. The easternmost house at number 301 has a projecting polygonal bay, limited stone ornament, and balconies. Numbers 303 and 305 have similar design details to number 301, except that they have entrances with Doric columns, pediments above the second story, and a cornice above the fourth story. Number 307 has a protruding entrance portico, bowed front, and quoins. Mowbray & Uffinger's seven houses at 309–321 West 105th Street are made of stone and have similar design details to the buildings on the south side, albeit with flat roofs instead of mansards. The buildings have either bowed fronts or polygonal bays, along with design elements such as stone blocks, Ionic pilasters, and broken pediments. Some of Mowbray & Uffinger's houses also have a mixture of details such as rusticated basements and brackets supporting roof cornices.

The two buildings at Riverside Drive's corners (330 and 337 Riverside Drive) are much larger than the others on the block. The Davis Mansion at 330 Riverside Drive, at the corner of 105th Street, has a brick-and-limestone facade with decorations such as brackets, balustraded balconies, cartouches, and pediments. The Davis Mansion also includes a pyramidal roof and a glass-enclosed conservatory, while its interior has 25 rooms spread across nearly 14,000 square feet (1,300 m^{2}). The River Mansion at 337 Riverside Drive has a dark-red brick facade with limestone trim and metal dormers. The basement of number 337 is made of stone, surrounded by a spiked iron fence, while the upper stories have limestone-framed windows in their outer bays. Adjoining 337 Riverside Drive is a house at 332 West 106th Street, with a buff brick facade, a rusticated ground-level entrance, French windows, and ornate roof dormers.

The residences at 331 and 333 (and formerly 332) Riverside Drive are nearly identical, with brick and limestone facades. Each building has a rusticated first-floor facade with garlands over the entrance; second-floor French windows with broken-arched pediments; and a cornice above the second floor. Number 333 retains decorative iron railings that no longer exist on number 331. Immediately to the north are 334–336 Riverside Drive, which have different designs. Number 334 has a masonry basement and brick facade, with a central arched entrance in the basement, a third-floor balcony and recessed window, and a fifth-floor dormer. Number 335 has a stone basement and a brick facade with stone decorations; its details include an Ionic portico, a balcony, a neo-Palladian window, and dormers. Number 336 has a limestone facade with an entrance stoop, stone balustrade, and brackets; unlike the other houses, the fifth floor is not recessed.

== History ==
=== Development ===
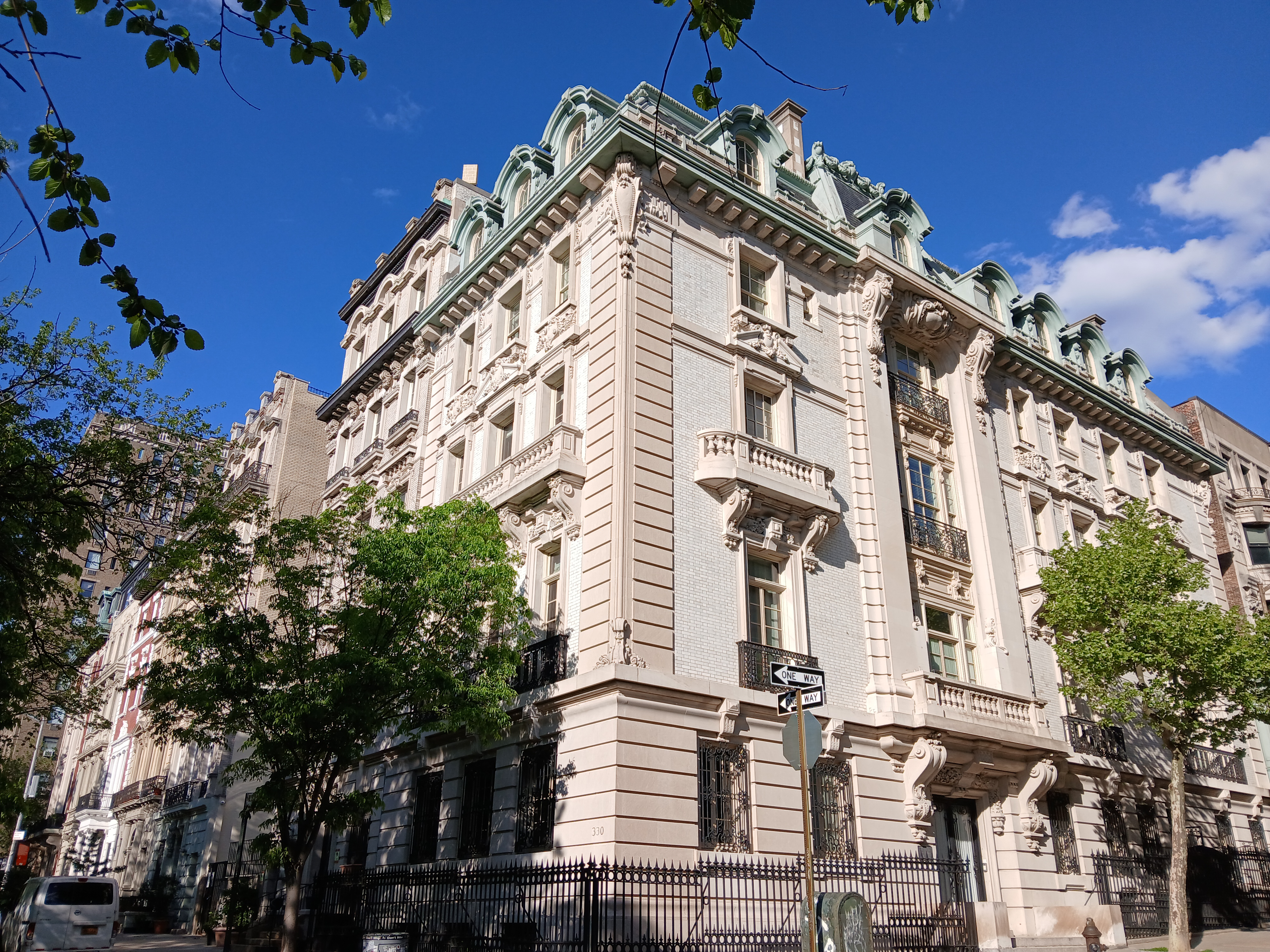
330 Riverside Drive

Before European colonization of modern-day New York City, the site was inhabited by the Lenape people. After the British established the Province of New York, the area became part of a land grant given to Isaac Bedlow, a city alderman, in 1667 or 1668. The land remained rural and undeveloped until the late 19th century, though two rural estates were built in the immediate environs: the Humphrey Jones Homestead (established before 1752) to the south and Woodlawn (established 1764) to the north. The Jones Homestead was destroyed in 1857, while Woodlawn persisted until 1864 when it was parceled up into land lots for development. Intense real estate speculation in the 1880s led to further development on the Upper West Side, including near the newly-completed Riverside Park and Riverside Drive on the neighborhood's western fringe. By the early 1890s, lots on the Upper West Side's periphery were being marketed to the upper middle class.

The houses were all built between 1899 and 1902. Four local developers were involved in constructing these houses; they were all obligated to design buildings that were "a benefit to the neighborhood". John C. Umberfield and Hamilton M. Weed were responsible for the houses on 105th Street, while Joseph A. Farley and Stewart & Smith built the houses on Riverside Drive; Stewart & Smith also built a single house in the district on 106th Street.

=== Usage ===
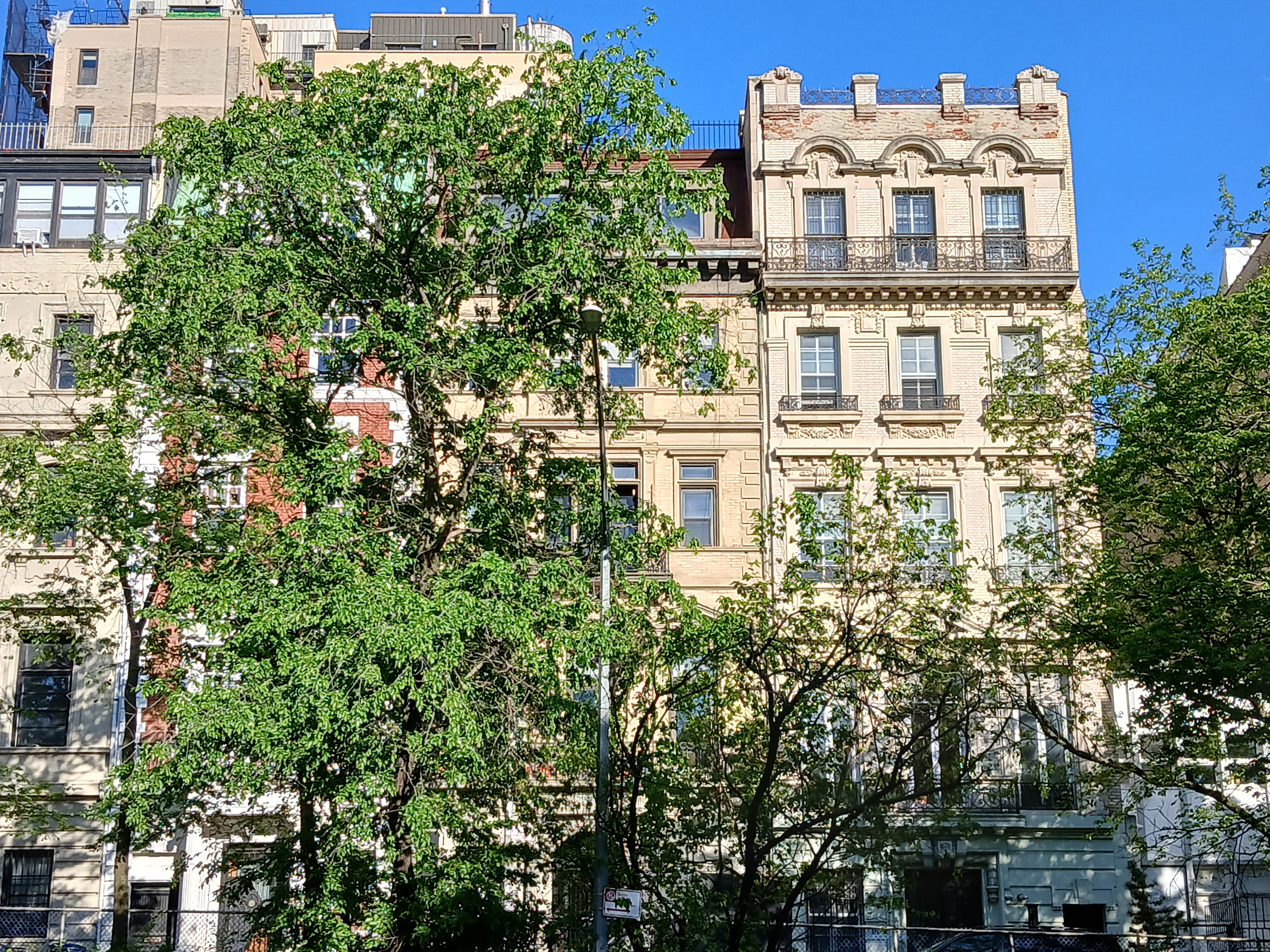
Some of the Riverside Drive houses

The Beaux-Arts style of the buildings was intended to attract well-off residents of other parts of the Upper West Side. Many of the original residents on Riverside Drive were indeed well off; the houses accommodated the families of senior executives at Pictorial Review magazine, the Eberhard Faber Pencil Company, and Goodyear Tire and Rubber Company. By the 1930s, the area had become rundown; for example, the house at number 334 had become a boarding house, where at one point a thief named Bennie the Bum died after an amputation following a botched robbery. Most of the district's buildings remained fully intact through the 20th century, in part because many of the buildings' original owners held onto their properties for long periods.

The New York Buddhist Church moved to the district in the mid-20th century, due to the cheap land values caused by the decline of the neighborhood. The church demolished 332 Riverside Drive while keeping the house at number 331, which was preserved. The adjacent Davis Mansion at 330 Riverside Drive was acquired by the Brothers of the La Salle Provincialate, which conveyed it in 1978 to a Catholic foundation affiliated with Opus Dei; that house became a retreat known as the Riverside Study Center. 337 Riverside Drive became the John Mace Music School. By the late 1970s, many of the other houses had been subdivided into student dormitories for the nearby Columbia University.

The New York City Landmarks Preservation Commission (LPC) first considered designating the houses as a historic district in 1966; the effort to designate the buildings as landmarks had been headed by a local resident who wanted to deter crime in the neighborhood. The LPC designated the area as a historic district on April 16, 1973, and the district was also added to the National Register of Historic Places on August 19, 1980. In addition, it is listed on the New York State Register of Historic Places.

== Notable people ==
Notable owners and residents of buildings in the district have included:

- Saul Bellow, writer; lived at 333 Riverside Drive
- Marion Davies, actress; lived at 331 Riverside Drive. That house was actually owned by Davies's lover William Randolph Hearst, who purchased it for Davies as a gift in 1918.
- Duke Ellington, jazz musician; owned 333 and 334 Riverside Drive in the 1950s and 1960s. The adjacent section of 106th Street is named Duke Ellington Boulevard in his honor.
- Julia Marlowe, actress; lived at 337 Riverside Drive
- Nina Simone, singer; lived at 336 Riverside Drive
- Jokichi Takamine, chemist; bought 334 Riverside Drive in 1909

== In media ==
The Riverside Drive buildings were the focus of The Man with the Sawed Off Leg, a 2018 book by Daniel J. Wakin. The houses on Riverside Drive were also detailed in Stephanie Azzarone's 2022 book Mansions, Monuments and Marvels of Riverside Park: Heaven on the Hudson.

== See also ==
- List of New York City Designated Landmarks in Manhattan from 59th to 110th Streets
- National Register of Historic Places listings in Manhattan from 59th to 110th Streets
- Riverside Drive–West 80th–81st Streets Historic District, another historic district on Riverside Drive

== Sources ==
- Azzarone, Stephanie (September 27, 2022). Heaven on the Hudson: Mansions, Monuments, and Marvels of Riverside Park. Fordham University Press. doi:10.2307/j.ctv2t5xg20.20. ISBN 978-1-5315-0102-0.
- National Register of Historic Places Inventory/Nomination: Riverside-West 105th Street Historic District (PDF) (Report). National Park Service. 1980. With accompanying pictures
- Riverside-West 105th Street Historic District (PDF) (Report). New York City Landmarks Preservation Commission. April 19, 1973.
