= Janes & Leo =

American architectural firm (1898–1911)

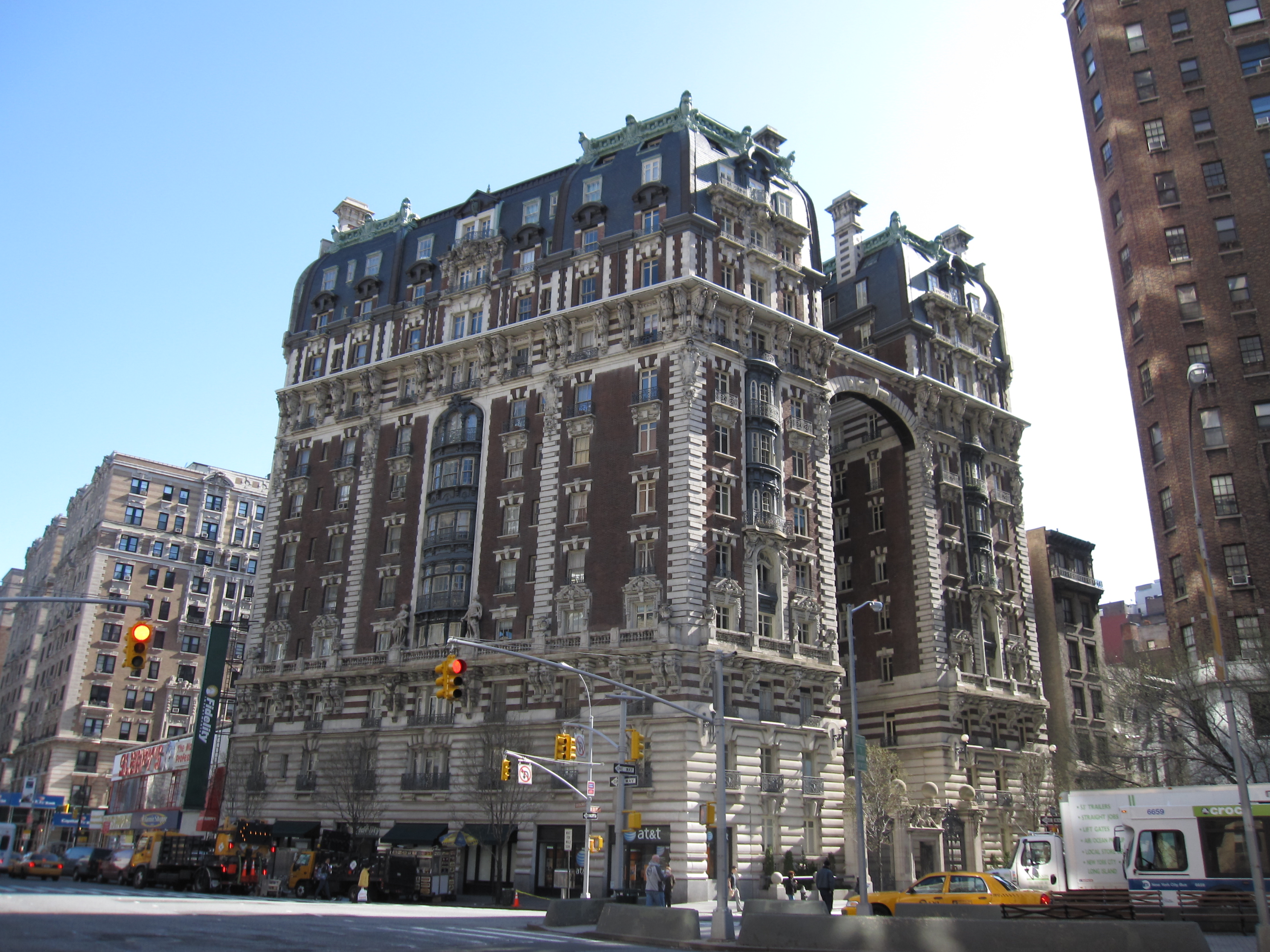
The Dorilton in New York was constructed by Janes & Leo.

Janes & Leo was the New York-based architectural firm of Elisha Harris Janes and Richard Leopold Leo (1871/72 — 26 September 1911). From 1898 to 1911, the firm designed and built numerous Beaux-Arts residential structures in New York City, both richly detailed row houses and luxury apartment blocks during the building boom that constructed Manhattan's Upper West Side. Though neither Elisha Harris Janes nor Richard Leopold Leo ever studied at the École des Beaux-Arts in Paris, they worked within its traditions. Their most prominent structure is the ebullient Dorilton (1902), at Broadway and 71st Street, bolder and more sculptural than any professor at the École des Beaux-Arts would have encouraged. Montgomery Schuyler, the critic for the Architectural Record, disapproved of its flamboyant appeal:

It was a most questionable and question-provoking edifice in the guise of an apartment house. It not merely solicits but demands attention. It yells 'Come and look at me' so loud that the preoccupied or even the color blind can not choose but hear.

The prominent corner site had been purchased by Hamilton M. Weed before the BMT Broadway Line had been finalized. It was the first grand apartment block to be completed on Upper Broadway. When it opened it had the expected separate servant and freight elevators and separate tenant storerooms as well as filtered water and even provision for charging electric automobiles. The Dorilton is entered through a narrow recessed court on 71st Street behind a Baroque wrought-iron screening fence with massive stone piers topped with weighty globes; far above, a masonry arch spans the recess at the ninth-floor level. Above a two-storey basement with channeled rustication, colossal limestone sculptures representing The Seasons survey Broadway.

Richard Leopold Leo was a graduate of the School of Architecture, Columbia University (1895). He built himself a house at Belle Harbor, Long Island, New York. He was a member of the Architectural League of New York.

Like many contemporary firms, Janes & Leo often depended for repetitive sculptural details on mold-cast matte-glazed architectural terracotta imitating limestone; the firm's designers sculpted the models from which the casts were taken.

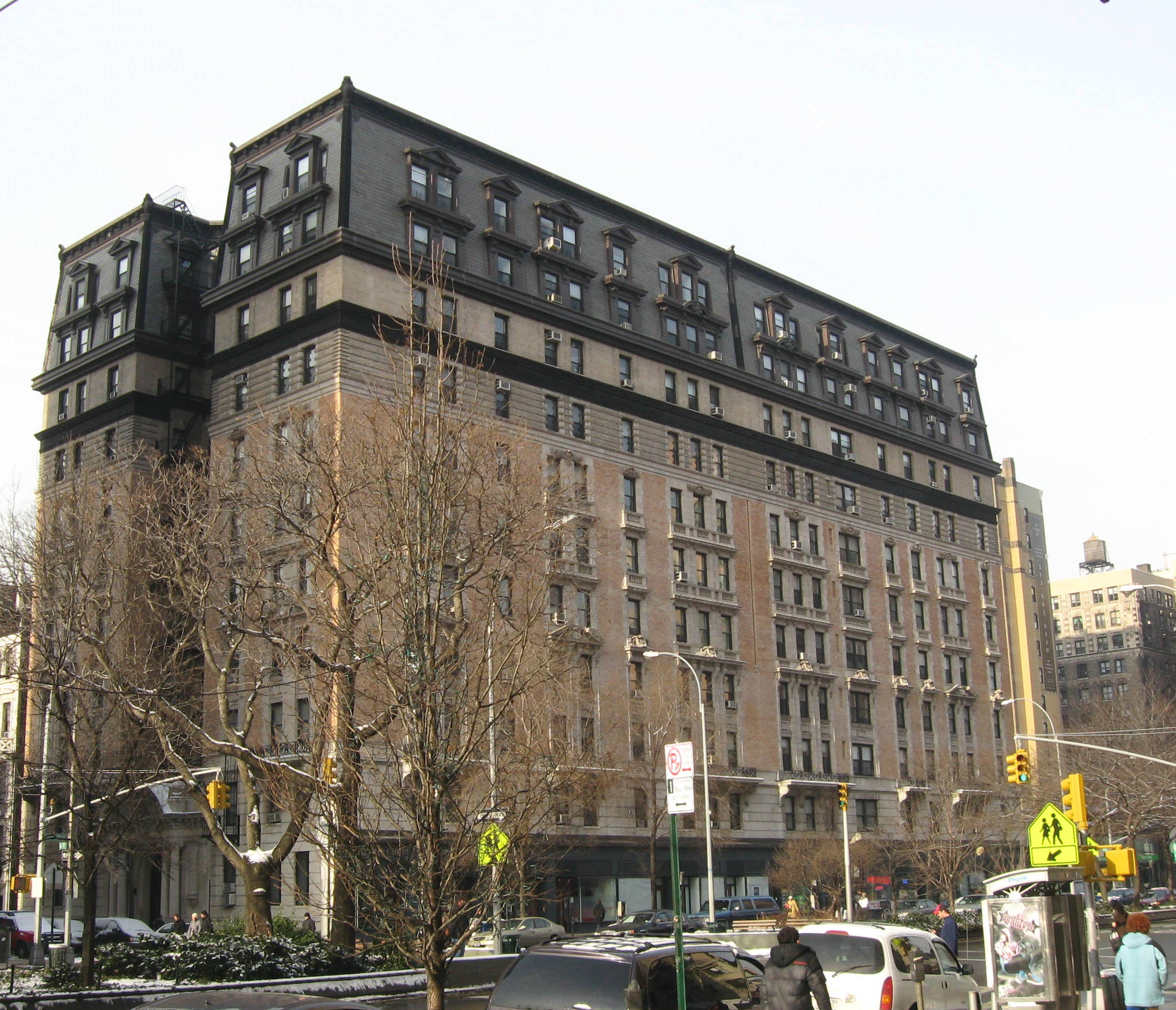
The Manhasset

== Selected commissions ==
- Emanu-El Sisterhood, 320 East 82nd St. (1900).
- Buildings in the Riverside–West 105th Street Historic District: 302-320 West 105th Street (1898–1902), for the real estate speculator John C. Umberfield, and 301–307, for Hamilton Weed, as well as 330–333 Riverside Drive, for Joseph A. Farley (332 Riverside Drive has since been demolished).
- The Leyland at 306 West 80th Street (1899), within the Riverside Drive–West 80th–81st Streets Historic District
- The Alimar (1899–1900), 925 West End Avenue at 105th Street, for Hamilton M. Weed.
- The Manhasset (1901–05), Broadway between 108th and 109th Streets, completed 1905. Janes and Leo recast a design, six years after construction started, after the initial developer defaulted, adding the three-story almost vertical mansard roof. Dark brick contrasted with limestone-colored architectural terracotta, a three-story almost vertical mansard roof. The lobbies and interiors were remodeled in the 1930s, when the original apartments were subdivided.
- 3 and 5 East 82nd Street (1901). A pair of townhouses built on speculation by James A. Farley. 3 East 82nd street was sold to Solomon Loeb, a founder of Kuhn, Loeb who conveyed it to his daughter and son-in-law Nina and Paul Warburg.
- The Dorilton, also for Hamilton M. Weed, 171 West 71st Street, at Broadway. Full-blown Beaux-Arts French Baroque, with monumental sculptures.
- The Wellsmore, Broadway and 77th Street, for realtors Bing & Bing (1910). Twelve stories of dark brick contrasted with limestone-colored architectural terracotta, which clads the first three stories and providing window jambs, spandrels and entablatures. there were only four apartments to a floor, each of seven to nine rooms, with rents from $1500 to $3750 per annum.

Elisha H. Janes continued to practice after Leo's death. In 1913 he provided plans for remodelling in the Twenty-Second Regiment Armory, 67th to 68th Streets, between Columbus Avenue and Broadway (demolished). He formed a partnership with the German-American architect August William Cordes, whose previous partner, Theodore William Emile De Lemos, had died in 1909. Their projects included the New York Women's League for Animals Building (1913), 348-354 Lafayette Street, (now in the NoHo District) and the Refrigeration Plant and Wholesale Market and Storage Buildings (1925–29) in The Bronx Terminal Market, Hunts Point.
