= Riverside Drive–West 80th–81st Streets Historic District =

Historic district in Manhattan, New York

- Riverside Drive-West 80th–81st Streets Historic District
- U.S. National Register of Historic Places
- U.S. Historic district
- New York State Register of Historic Places
- New York City Landmark
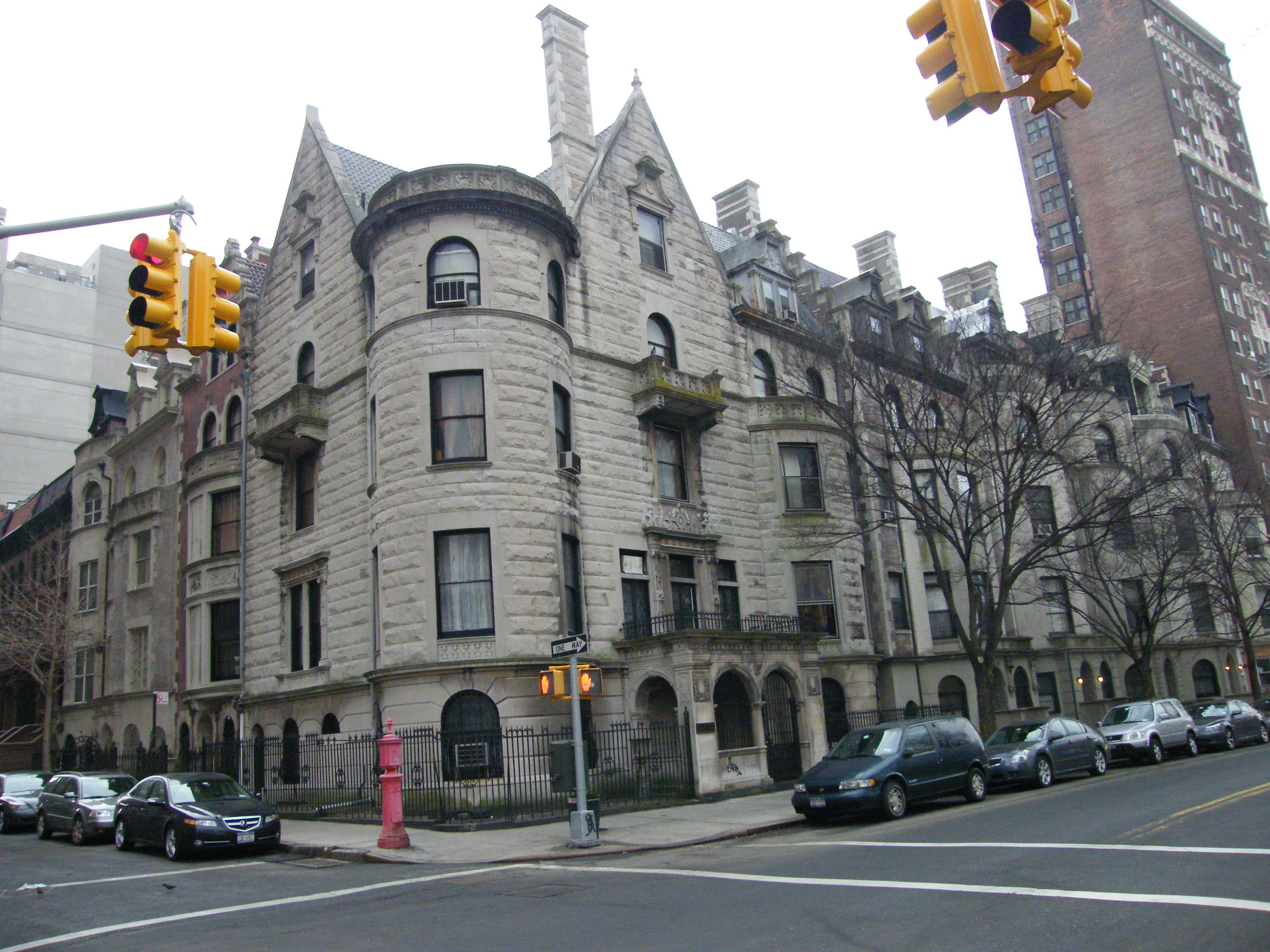
- Houses at Riverside Drive and 81st Street

- Location within Manhattan Location within New York City Location within New York Location within the United States
- Location: Riverside Dr., W. 80th and W. 81st Sts., New York, New York
- Coordinates: 40°47′28″N 73°58′56″W
- Area: 2.5 acres (1.0 ha)
- Built: 1892
- Architect: Clarence True; Charles Israels
- Architectural style: Beaux Arts, Tudor Revival, Romanesque
- NRHP reference No.: 84002790
- NYCL No.: 1429

Significant dates
- Added to NRHP: 1984-06-10
- Designated NYSRHP: 1984-04-03
- Designated NYCL: 1985-03-26

The Riverside Drive–West 80th–81st Streets Historic District is a historic district on the Upper West Side of Manhattan in New York City, New York, US. The district includes 32 attached rowhouses, built between 1892 and 1899. These include 11 houses designed by Charles H. Israels in the Renaissance Revival, Romanesque Revival, and Gothic Revival styles, and 21 houses designed by Clarence F. True in an Elizabethan style. There are also four apartment buildings: three 6-story structures dating from between 1898 and 1901, and a 16-story building dating from 1927. The district is both listed on the National Register of Historic Places and designated by the New York City Landmarks Preservation Commission.

== Description ==
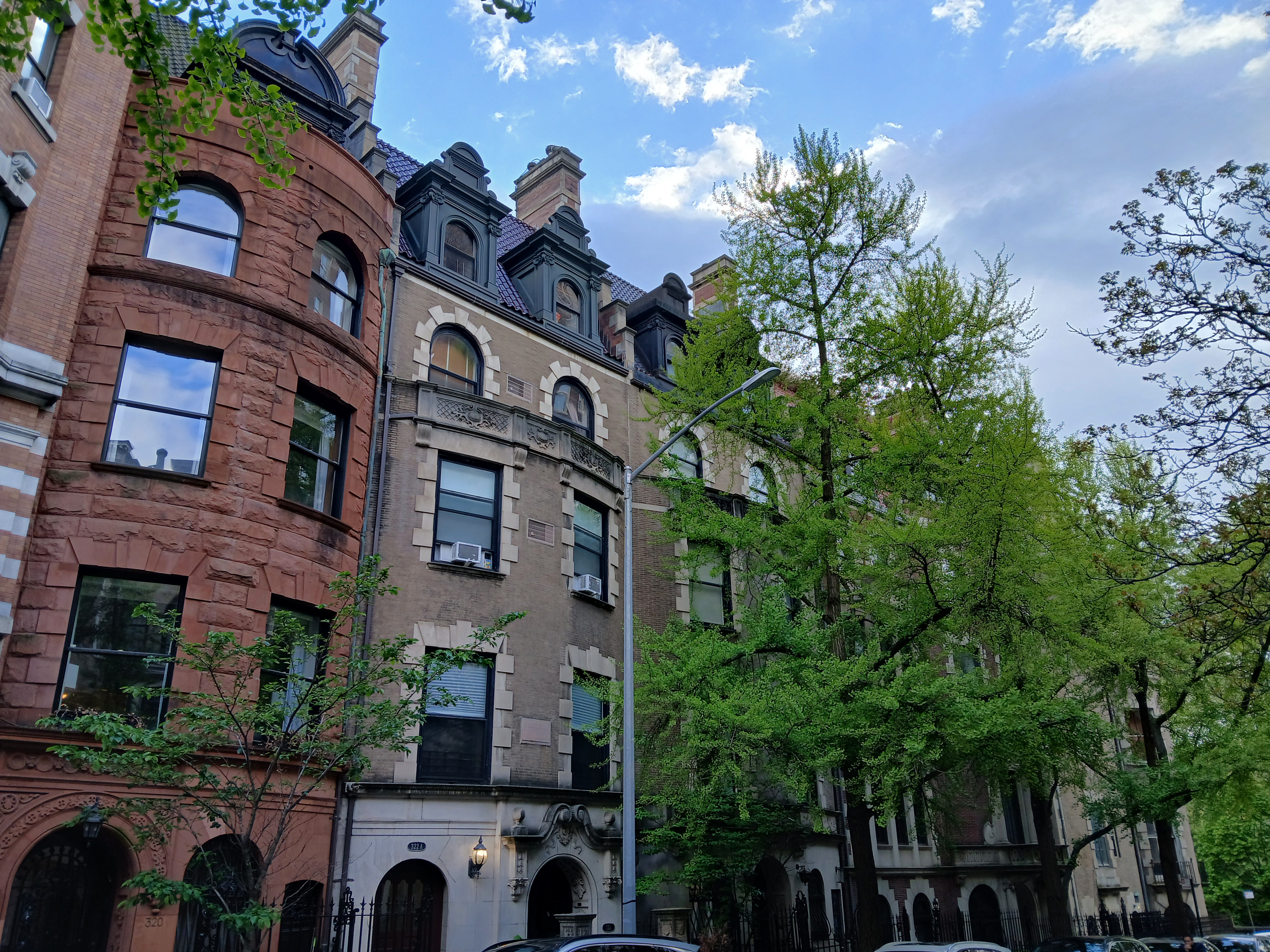
Some of Clarence F. True's buildings on the south side of 80th Street

The Riverside Drive–West 80th–81st Streets Historic District is a small residential historic district on the Upper West Side of Manhattan in New York City, New York, US. The district is listed on the National Register of Historic Places (NRHP) and designated by the New York City Landmarks Preservation Commission. It encompasses 36 buildings, of which 32 are rowhouses or townhouses and the other four are apartment buildings. The district consists of the buildings on the east side of Riverside Drive, both sides of 80th Street, and the south side of 81st Street. Addresses in the district include 303–326 West 80th Street (except number 325); even address numbers at 304–320 West 81st Street; and 74–86 Riverside Drive. The district's eastern boundary is just west of West End Avenue. The surrounding buildings include high-density apartments and a school.

=== Rowhouses ===
The district's houses are notable for having remained relatively intact after World War I, unlike other parts of the Upper West Side, where many rowhouses were replaced with apartment buildings. There are 32 attached townhouses and rowhouses, built between 1892 and 1899. All of the houses in the district were designed by either Charles H. Israels or Clarence F. True. The designs were all intended as multi-story residences for the upper-middle class. are reminiscent of McKim, Mead & White's Beaux-Arts architecture. They include elaborate details such as chimneys, outwardly-bowed facades, oriel windows, and parapets.

Israels designed the oldest 11 houses, which adjoin each other at 306–314 West 81st Street and 307–317 West 80th Street. Both of Israels's rows of houses contain elements of the Renaissance Revival and another style; the 81st Street houses have Romanesque Revival elements, while those on 80th Street have Gothic Revival influences. Israels's 81st Street houses are each three stories high, with a raised basement partially visible above ground level. The 81st Street houses have brownstone fronts, high stoops, oriel windows, drip moldings surrounding round-arched windows on the third story, elaborate iron cornices, and tile roofs. Israels's 80th Street houses are four stories high and also have raised basements. The 80th Street houses have tan or yellow brick facades with terracotta trim and limestone accents. These houses have pointed-arch windows on the first story, stained glass transom windows, protruding oriels, and decorative moldings.

True was responsible for the remaining 21 rowhouses in the district, which were designed after Israels's houses. True had designed another rowhouse within the modern district's boundaries, which was later replaced by one of the district's apartment buildings, 80 Riverside Drive. True's houses, inspired by English Renaissance architecture, are designed in what he described as the "Elizabethan Revival" style and share similarities with his other Northern European-inspired work. The houses, some of which have raised basements, are generally five stories high. Some of these buildings' facades are made of brick with limestone trim, while others are made of limestone or sandstone. The buildings are also ornamented with decorations such as pilasters, strapwork, cartouches, gables, bowed fronts, stepped party walls, and protruding chimneys. True's houses are part of a larger collection of houses that he designed on Riverside Drive south of 84th Street.

=== Apartment houses ===
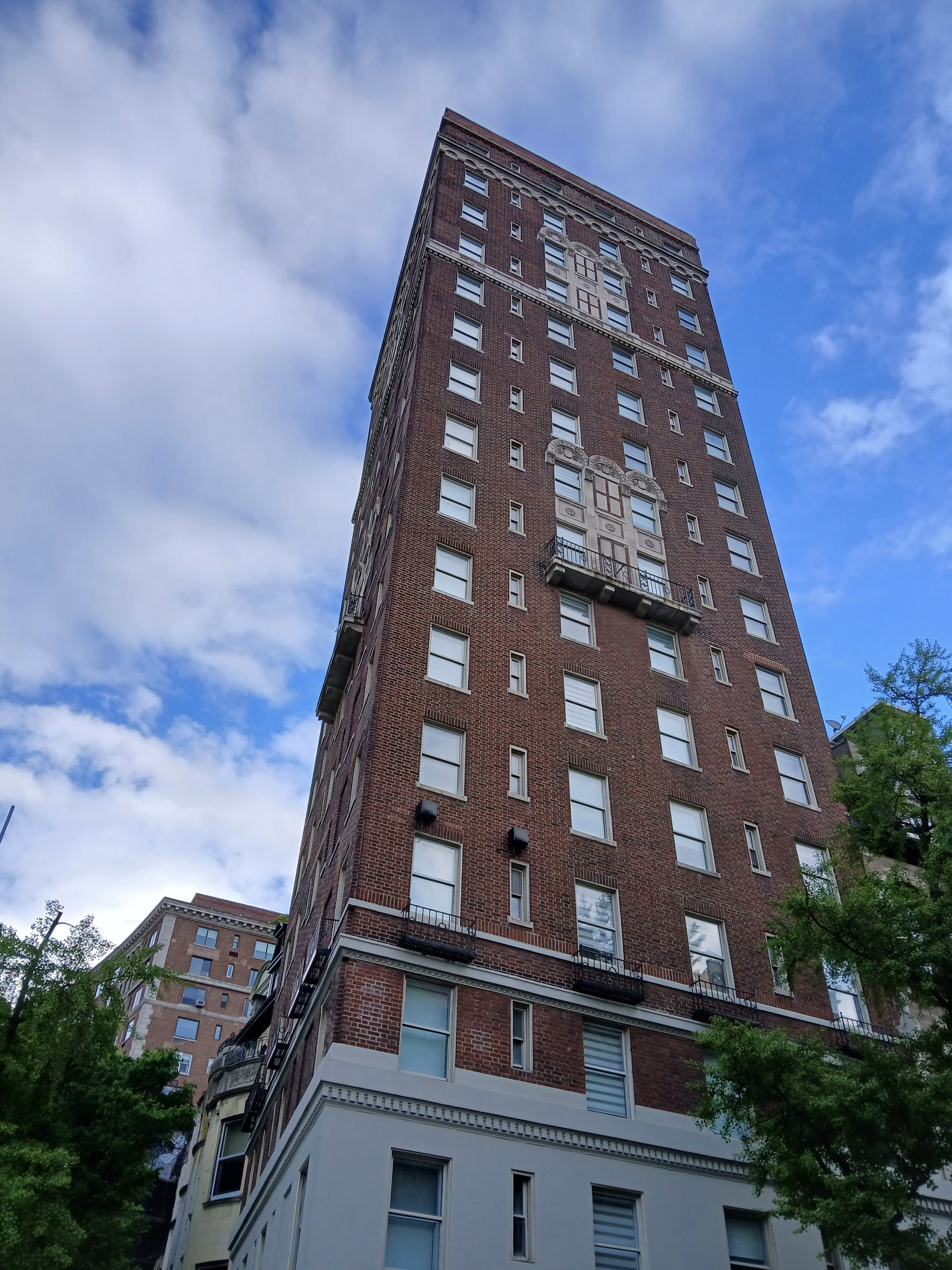
80 Riverside Drive

The district also includes four apartment buildings, dating from the early 20th century. Three of the apartment buildings are contributing properties to the NRHP district; these were built in the late 1890s and early 1900s and designed in the Renaissance Revival and Beaux-Arts styles. (Note: Both the National Park Service and New York City Landmarks Preservation Commission describe 303–305 West 80th Street and 310 West 81st Street as Beaux-Arts. However, the National Park Service describes 306 West 81st Street as Beaux-Arts, while the Landmarks Preservation Commission describes that building as Renaissance Revival.) These apartment houses are six stories high and were intended for middle-class workers. Each of the apartment houses has brick facades with terracotta and limestone trim, and all were designed by different architects. Townsend & Harde designed The Townsend at 303–305 West 80th Street; Janes & Leo designed The Leyland at 306 West 81st Street; and J.E. Ware & Son designed The Fontenay at 310 West 81st Street. These buildings, a transitional design between older rowhouses and early-20th-century multi-family buildings, were intended to mimic the elaborate ornamentation of the district's houses.

The fourth building is from the 1920s and designed in the Neoclassical style or Neo-Georgian style. Located at 80 Riverside Drive, it is sixteen stories tall and designed by Maurice Deutsch, with a brick facade. Unlike all the other buildings, it is not a contributing property to the NRHP district.

== History ==
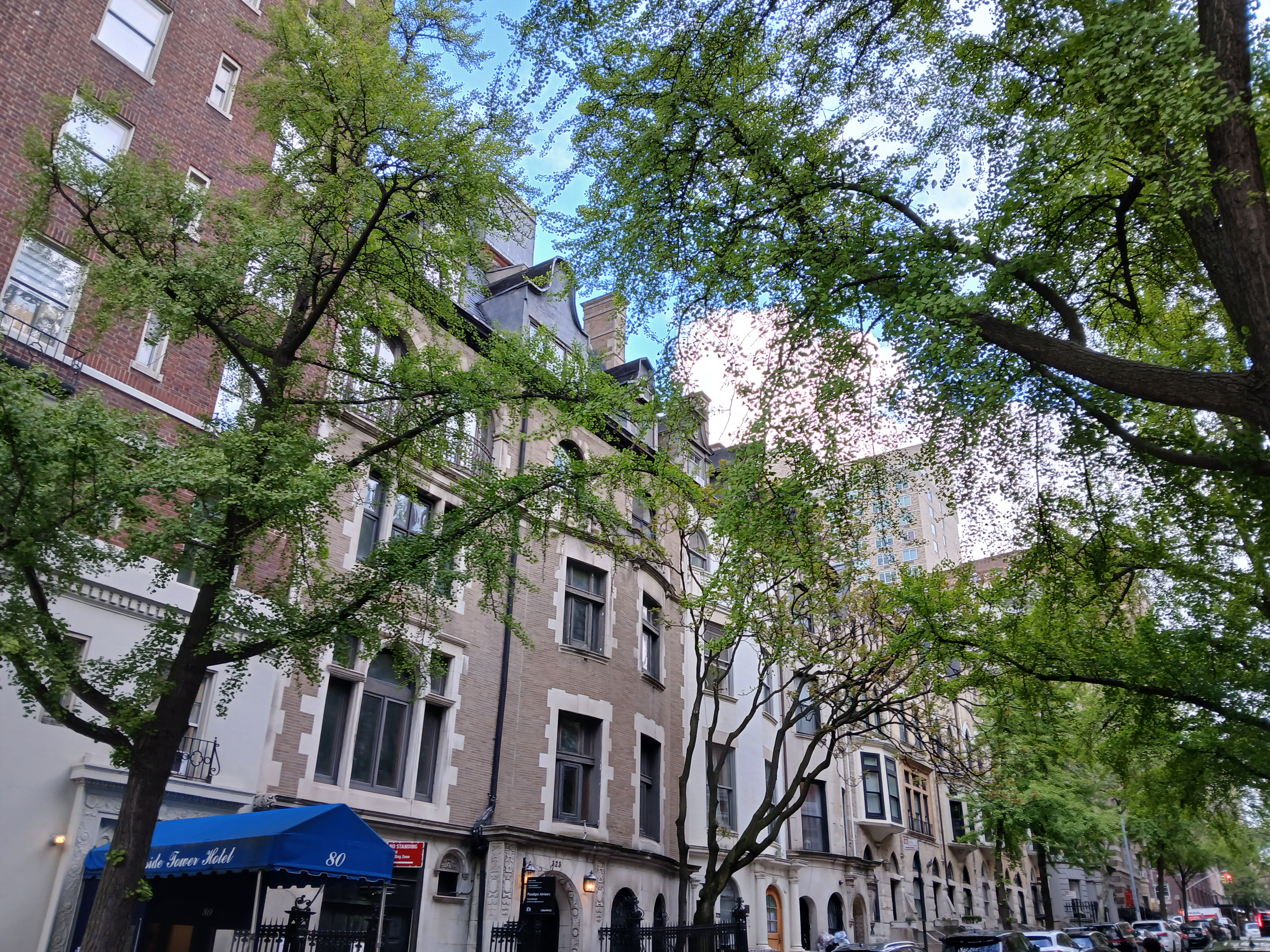
Eastward view on 80th Street. The Townsend at 303–305 West 80th Street is visible at center left, and 80 Riverside Drive is at far left. To the right are some of Israels's buildings.

Before European colonization of modern-day New York City, the site was inhabited by the Lenape people. After the British established the Province of New York, the area became part of the "Thousand Acre Tract", owned by several English and Dutch settlers, in 1667. The site between modern-day 80th and 81st streets was part of the estate of Egbert Wouterse. Stephen De Lancey acquired the land from modern-day 78th to 89th streets before 1729 and used it as his countryside estate. He died in 1741 and left the estate to his son Oliver De Lancey. Charles Ward Apthorp acquired the southern portion of De Lancey's estate in 1763, and it was passed down through the family. The site was sold to Francis Price in 1827 and subsequently parceled out, but little development occurred until the late 19th century, when the construction of the IRT Ninth Avenue Line farther east led to a development boom around Columbus Avenue. Intense real estate speculation in the 1880s led to further development on the Upper West Side, including near the newly-completed Riverside Park and Riverside Drive on the neighborhood's western fringe.

Bernard Levy, a Jewish real-estate developer, commissioned the first houses in the district. In 1892, he hired Charles H. Israels to design five houses at 306–314 West 81st Street. Two years later, Levy rehired Israels to design another two rowhouses at 307–317 West 80th Street. During the same decade, the architect Clarence True was buying vacant land on the southernmost portion of Riverside Drive below 84th Street. On these sites, True developed additional houses between 1897 and 1899. Shortly afterward, between 1898 and 1901, three groups of architects each developed six-story apartment buildings within the district. One of True's houses was demolished to make way for additional development in the early 20th century. This building, designed by Maurice Deutsch, was completed in 1927. (Note: National Park Service 1984, p. 5, gives a different completion date of 1919 for this building.)

The district was added to the National Register of Historic Places in 1984 and designated by the New York City Landmarks Preservation Commission as a city landmark district on March 26, 1985. It became one of several city-designated historic districts on the Upper West Side, particularly on Riverside Drive. The historians Andrew Dolkart and Matthew Postal wrote that the district "illustrates, in microcosm, the early residential development" of the Upper West Side's farthest western reaches.

== See also ==
- List of New York City Designated Landmarks in Manhattan from 59th to 110th Streets
- National Register of Historic Places listings in Manhattan from 59th to 110th Streets
- Riverside–West 105th Street Historic District, another historic district on Riverside Drive

== Sources ==
- "National Register of Historic Places Inventory/Nomination: Riverside Drive-West 80th–81st Streets Historic District" (PDF). National Park Service. 1984. With accompanying pictures
- Riverside Drive-West 80th–81st Street Historic District (PDF) (Report). New York City Landmarks Preservation Commission. March 26, 1985.
- West End-Collegiate Historic District Extension (PDF) (Report). New York City Landmarks Preservation Commission. June 25, 2013.
- Stokes, Isaac Newton Phelps (1928). The Iconography of Manhattan Island, 1498–1909. Vol. 6. Robert H. Dodd.
