= The Dorilton =

Housing cooperative in New York City

- Dorilton
- U.S. National Register of Historic Places
- New York State Register of Historic Places
- New York City Landmark
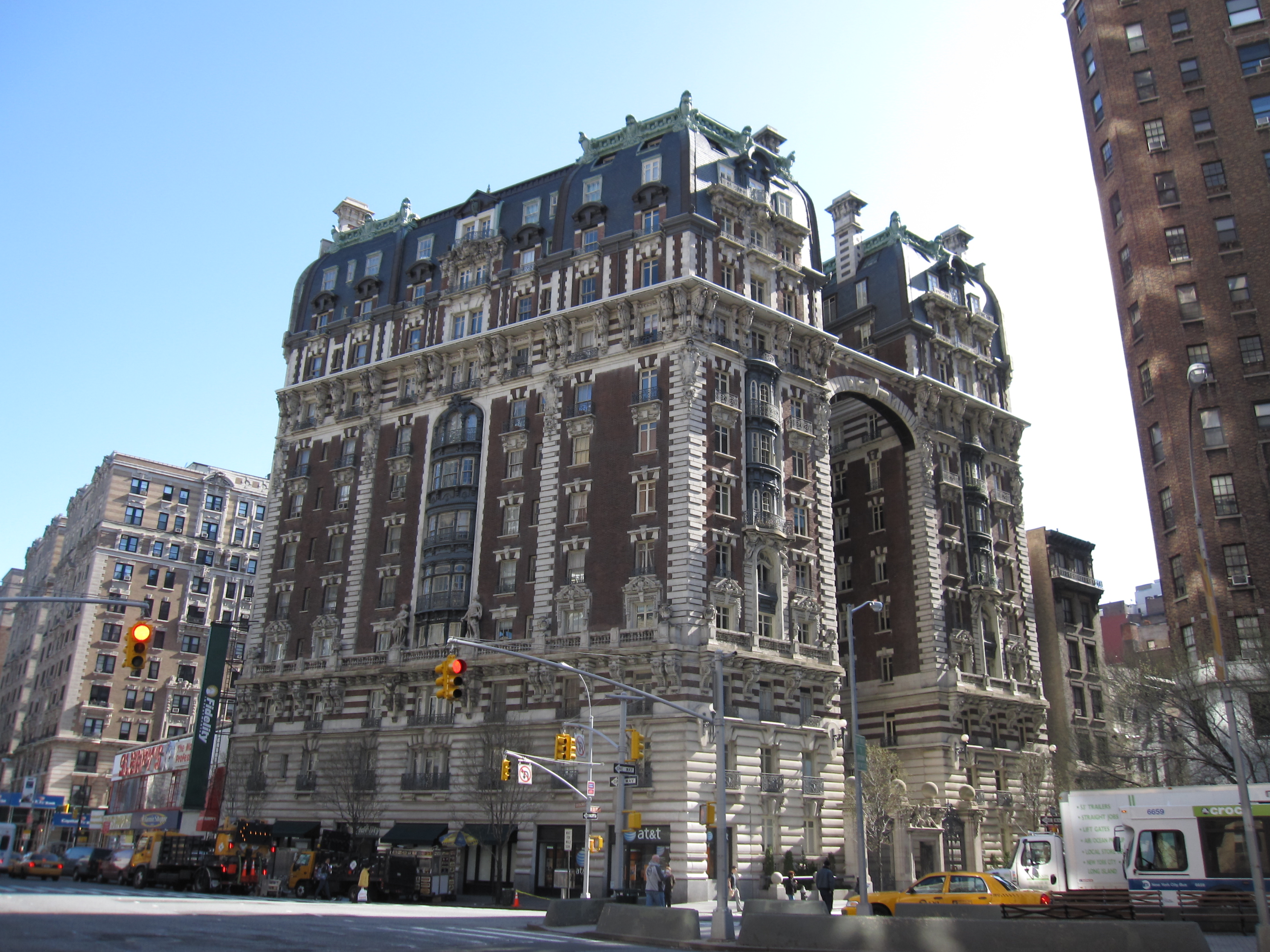
- Location: 171 W. 71st St., Manhattan, New York
- Coordinates: 40°46′41″N 73°58′54″W
- Area: less than one acre
- Built: 1900
- Architect: Janes & Leo
- Architectural style: Beaux Arts
- NRHP reference No.: 83001723
- NYSRHP No.: 06101.000650
- NYCL No.: 0858

Significant dates
- Added to NRHP: September 8, 1983
- Designated NYSRHP: August 4, 1983
- Designated NYCL: September 8, 1983

The Dorilton is a luxury residential housing cooperative at 171 West 71st Street, at the northeast corner with Broadway, on the Upper West Side of Manhattan in New York City. The 12-story building, designed by local firm Janes & Leo in the Beaux-Arts style, was built between 1900 and 1902 for real estate developer Hamilton M. Weed. The Dorilton is a New York City designated landmark and is listed on the National Register of Historic Places.

The Dorilton is roughly H-shaped in plan, with recessed light courts facing south and north. The southern light court, along 71st Street, functions as an entrance courtyard with a gateway. The limestone-and-brick facade is divided into three horizontal sections: a three-story base, six-story shaft, and three-story upper section with mansard roof. The decoration on the facade includes bronze oriel windows curving outward, as well as sculptures, decorative terracotta, and balconies. Inside, the building had its own mechanical plant and three elevators. The lobby had several classical details, while the upper stories had 48 apartments, which by the 21st century had been divided into 60 apartments. The units contained decorations such as paneling, Queen Anne style fireplaces, French doors, and round window bays. Since its completion, the building has been both praised and sharply criticized for its unusual design.

Weed bought the site in February 1900 and hired the firm of Janes & Leo to design a twelve-story apartment hotel on the site. The building cost $750,000 and was intended to attract middle-class residents who otherwise would not have lived in apartments. Storefronts on the ground floor were added after 1919, and many decorative elements were removed or had deteriorated by the 1950s. The Dorilton was sold several times over the years before becoming a housing cooperative in 1984. The exterior was restored in the late 1980s and again in the 1990s, and the interior spaces were restored in the mid-2010s.

== Site ==
The Dorilton is at 171 West 71st Street, at the northeast corner with Amsterdam Avenue and Broadway, on the Upper West Side of Manhattan in New York City. It occupies the western end of a city block bounded by Broadway to the west, 72nd Street to the north, Central Park West to the east, and 71st Street to the south. The Dorilton occupies a trapezoidal plot because Broadway runs diagonally to the Manhattan street grid. The land lot covers 13,393 square feet (1,244.3 m^{2}), with a frontage of 110 feet (34 m) on 71st Street. The Broadway frontage has variously been cited as 100 feet (30 m), 105.5 feet (32.2 m), or 109 feet (33 m). The northern boundary of the site measures 150 feet (46 m) wide.

The building is near several other structures, including the Rutgers Presbyterian Church and the Ansonia apartments to the northwest, the Apple Bank Building one block north, the Triad Theatre to the east, and the Church of the Blessed Sacrament and the Pythian Temple to the southwest. Directly west of the Dorilton is Verdi Square and an entrance for the New York City Subway's 72nd Street station. In addition, Sherman Square is directly to the southwest.

== Architecture ==
The building was designed by Janes & Leo for real estate developer Hamilton M. Weed. The building has a Beaux-Arts style limestone and brick exterior, featuring monumental sculptures, richly balustraded balconies, and a copper and slate mansard roof. The Dorilton is twelve stories high; the facade rises ten stories before the mansard roof.

=== Form and facade ===
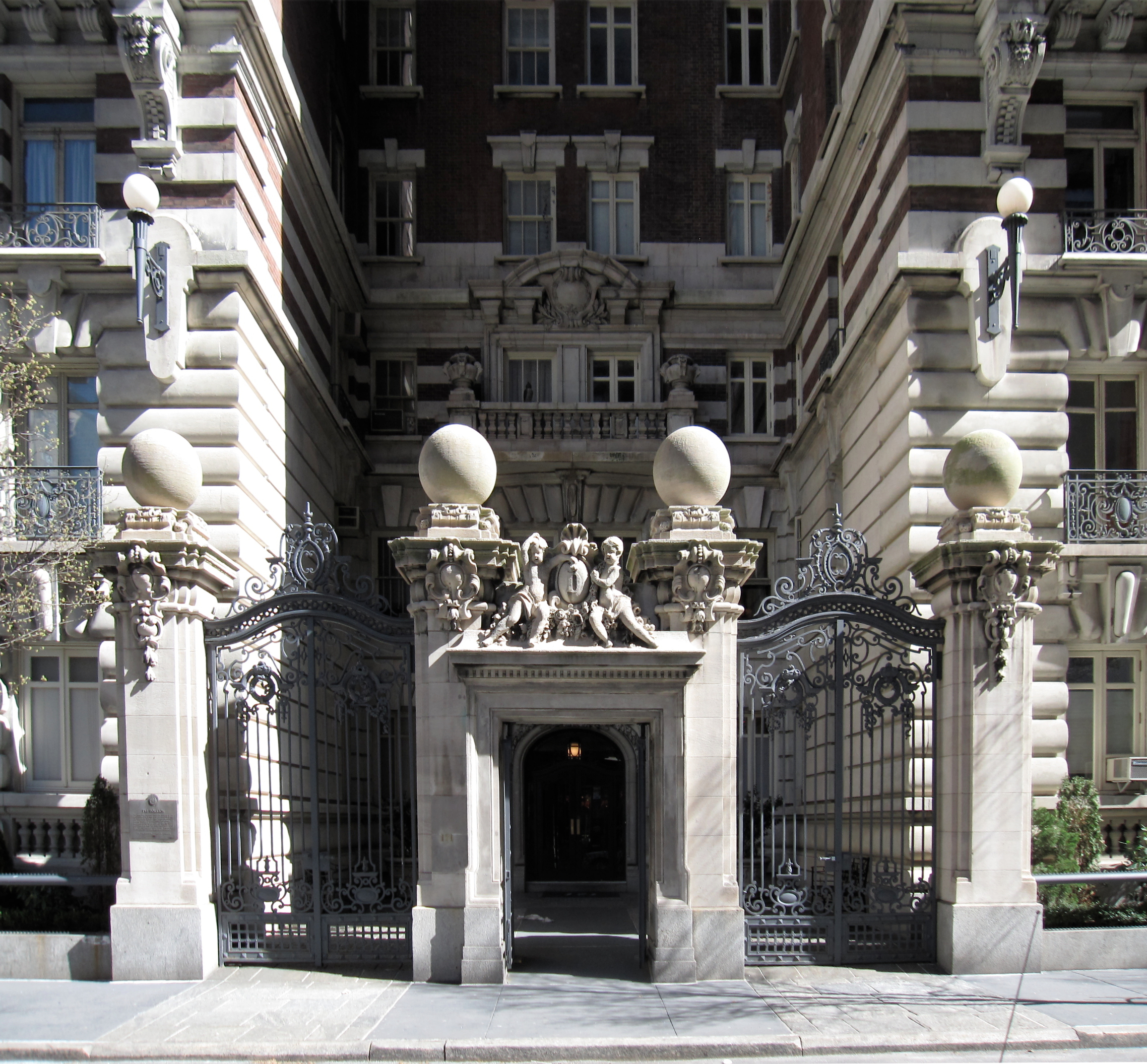
The gateway on 71st Street

The Dorilton is roughly H-shaped in plan, with recessed light courts facing south and north. The southern light court, along 71st Street, functions as an entrance courtyard with a gateway divided into three sections. The outer two sections of the gateway contain large wrought-iron gates, behind which was a small, U-shaped driveway, while the center section contains a pedestrian entrance. The gateway also contains four limestone columns, which flank each section; the tops of the columns contain crestings and limestone spheres. In addition, between the two center columns is a frame that surrounds the pedestrian gate, which is decorated with a shield and two cherubs.

The facade is divided into three horizontal sections, similar to the base, shaft, and capital of a column. The base consists of the first through third stories; the shaft comprises the fourth through ninth stories; and the capital includes the top three stories. At ground level, the building was originally surrounded by a recessed areaway, which was infilled in the 20th century. The ground and second stories of the facade are clad with rusticated blocks of limestone, while the third story is clad with alternating limestone-and-brick bands. Historical photographs indicate that the ground level facade on Broadway originally contained windows. By the late 20th century, the ground level contained storefronts facing Broadway. There is a large balcony above the third story, which is supported by heavy brackets, some of which are grouped in pairs. The balcony also contains a balustrade, which was originally topped by red or gray terracotta vases.

The midsection is clad largely in brick, except for the corners, which have limestone quoins. The brick was originally painted bright red. The Broadway facade is divided into three pavilions. There are bronze oriel windows curving outward from the center of the Broadway facade and from the center of either wing on 71st Street. The oriel windows on 71st Street are flanked by depictions of the mythological figure Atlas. The oriel window on Broadway is five stories tall and is flanked by representations of women at the fourth story. The northern and eastern elevations are faced in cheaper red brick with varying hues and textures. The ninth story is clad with alternating limestone-and-brick bands. At the ninth story, the southern light court is spanned by an arch, which is supported by a steel truss embedded within it. There are shields at either end of the arch, as well as deep voussoirs and a central keystone on the arch itself; the top of the arch is flat.

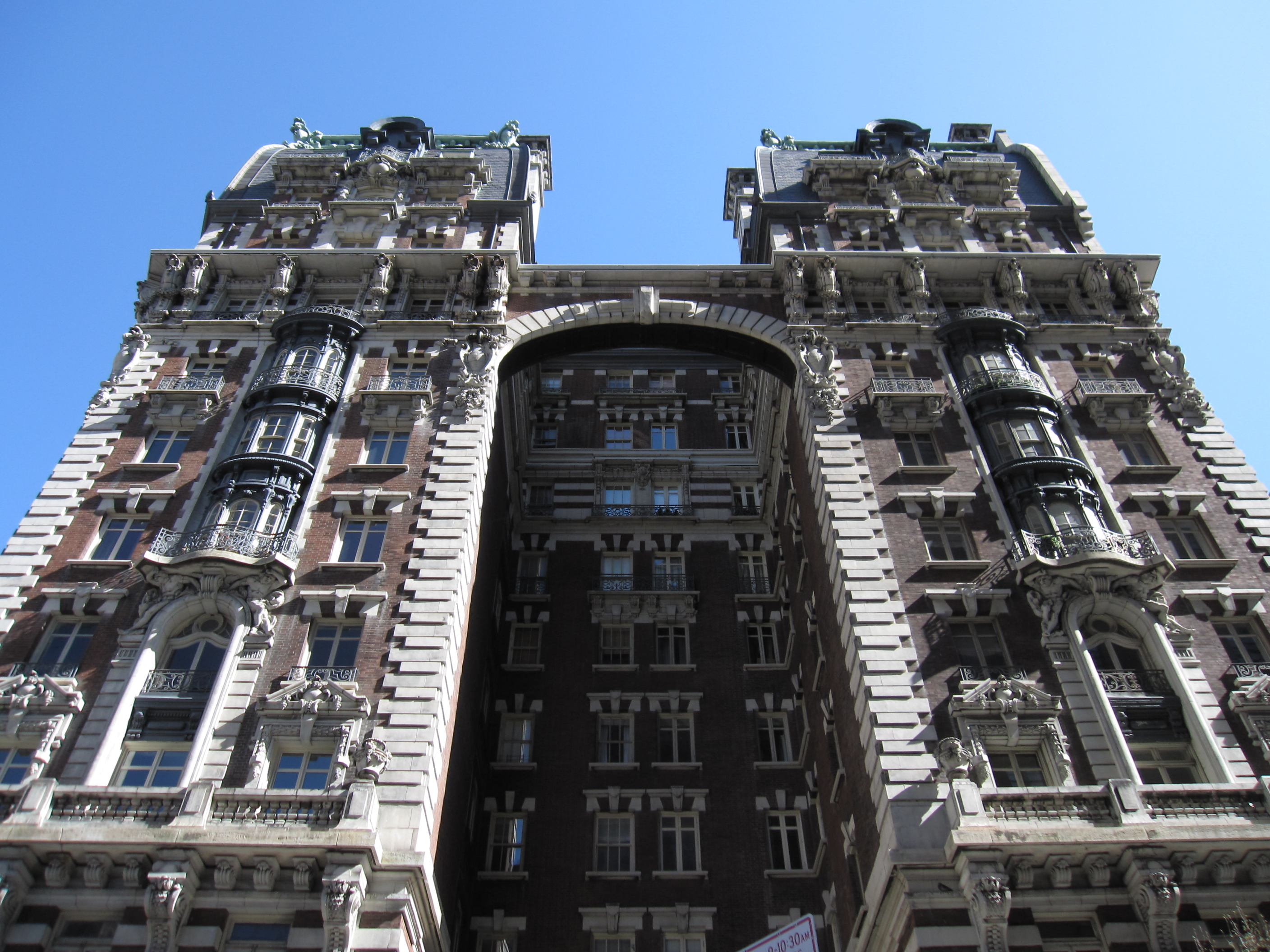
View of the facade from 71st Street

The tenth story once contained another balcony, decorated with a balustrade and urns. The balcony was supported by large brackets on the ninth floor, which still exist. The building's mansard roof is variously cited as rising two and a half stories or three stories. The mansard was originally covered with slate, but this was replaced with tar paper in the mid-20th century. In addition, there was formerly segmentally-arched terracotta lintels above the eleventh-story windows, as well as large terracotta lintels above the three largest dormer windows on the mansard roof. Some of the copper cresting on the roof remains intact, and there are also chimneys.

=== Features ===
The Dorilton's entrance vestibule is decorated with putti that flank a cartouche, similar to the motifs above the center section of the 71st Street gateway. The lobby had several classical details, many of which were later painted over. The building has two passenger elevators and one service elevator, the latter used by freight and servants. The Dorilton also contained a lighting, heating, power, and refrigeration plant in one of its courtyards. The basement contained a storage room for every tenant, as well as an "automobile storage and charging room", which at the time was a novel feature for a New York City apartment building. When the Dorilton opened, each apartment and hallway had a telephone connecting with a janitor's office, and all tenants could use electricity from the building's power plant for free.

==== Apartments ====
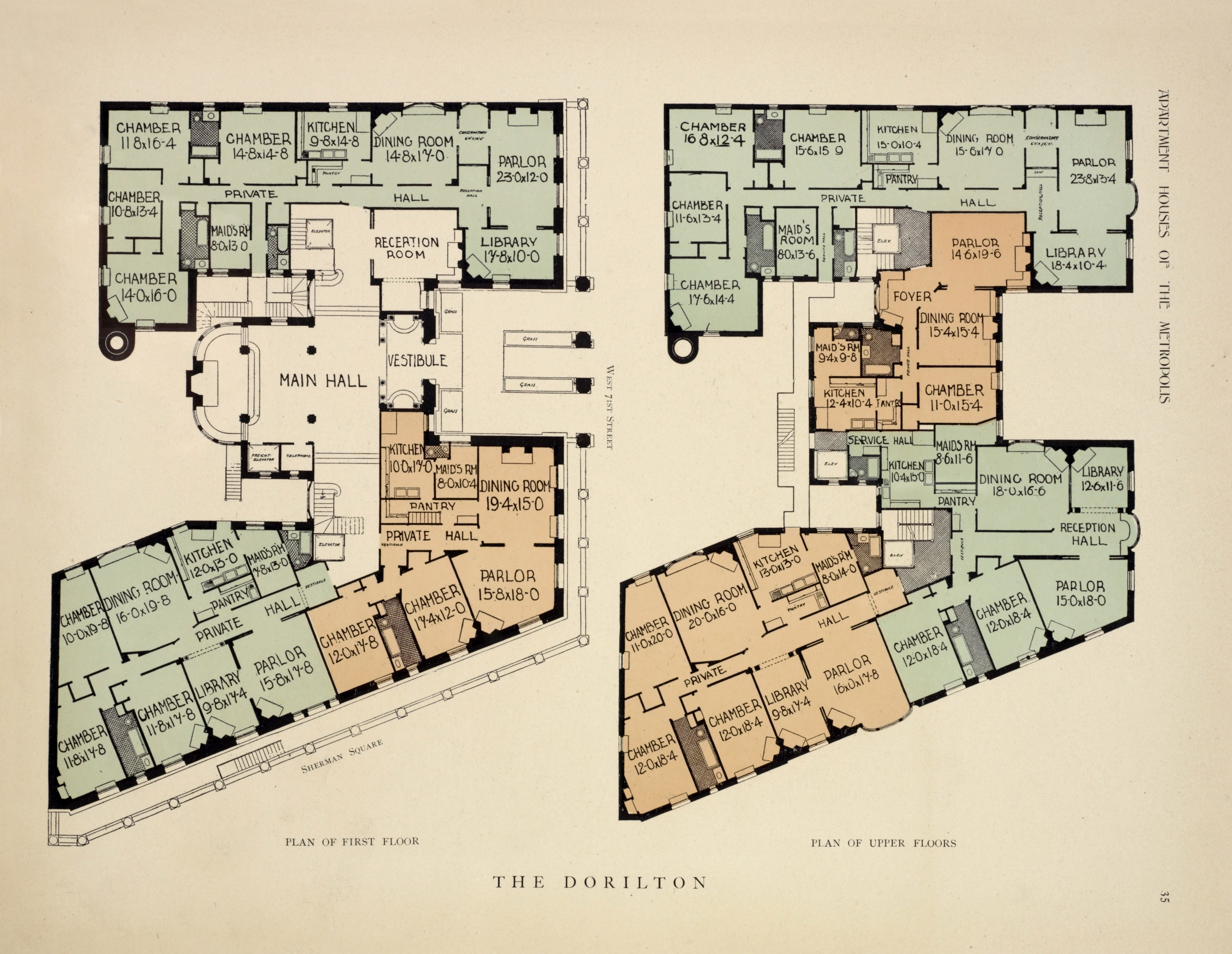
Historical floor plan of the upper stories

The upper stories originally had four apartments per floor. These apartments were arranged in suites with five, seven, eight, or ten rooms; there were one to four bedrooms in each unit. By 1923, there were 48 units in total, each with five to eight rooms, and each floor contained two to three bathrooms that were shared by all of the apartments. When the building was developed, the space under the mansard roof was intended to be leased out as artists' studios. The top of the building contained a roof garden, in addition to "sun parlors" measuring 35 by 35 feet (11 by 11 m).

The units were decorated with mahogany, oak, white-enamel, and maple trim. The hallways contained paneled wainscoting, while the floors were laid in a parquet pattern, Each residence had a parlor clad with white enamel and mahogany; the dining rooms had high wooden wainscoting, oak-and-mahogany finishes, and beamed ceilings. Many of the apartments were illuminated by the curved oriel windows of the facade. In contrast to later apartment buildings, the apartments typically had much fewer bathrooms than bedrooms, and the closets were extremely small. The hallways were also smaller than in later apartment buildings.

Over the years, many of the apartments have been divided into smaller units. These apartments retain some of their original decorations, such as paneling, Queen Anne style fireplaces, French doors, and round window bays. By the early 21st century, the building had 60 apartments, which vary in layout, and some of the units are duplexes. For instance, one of the eighth-floor duplexes has four bedrooms, two each on the upper and lower levels, in addition to various other rooms. Another unit, a two-bedroom apartment, contains a living room, a dining room, a kitchen, and outdoor terrace. Some of the apartments have fireplaces in both the living room and the dining room, in addition to curved oriel windows. Other apartments have design elements such as private libraries, French doors, and balconies; one of the penthouses has a 2,000-square-foot (190 m^{2}) terrace with a Jacuzzi, dining area, and plants.

== History ==
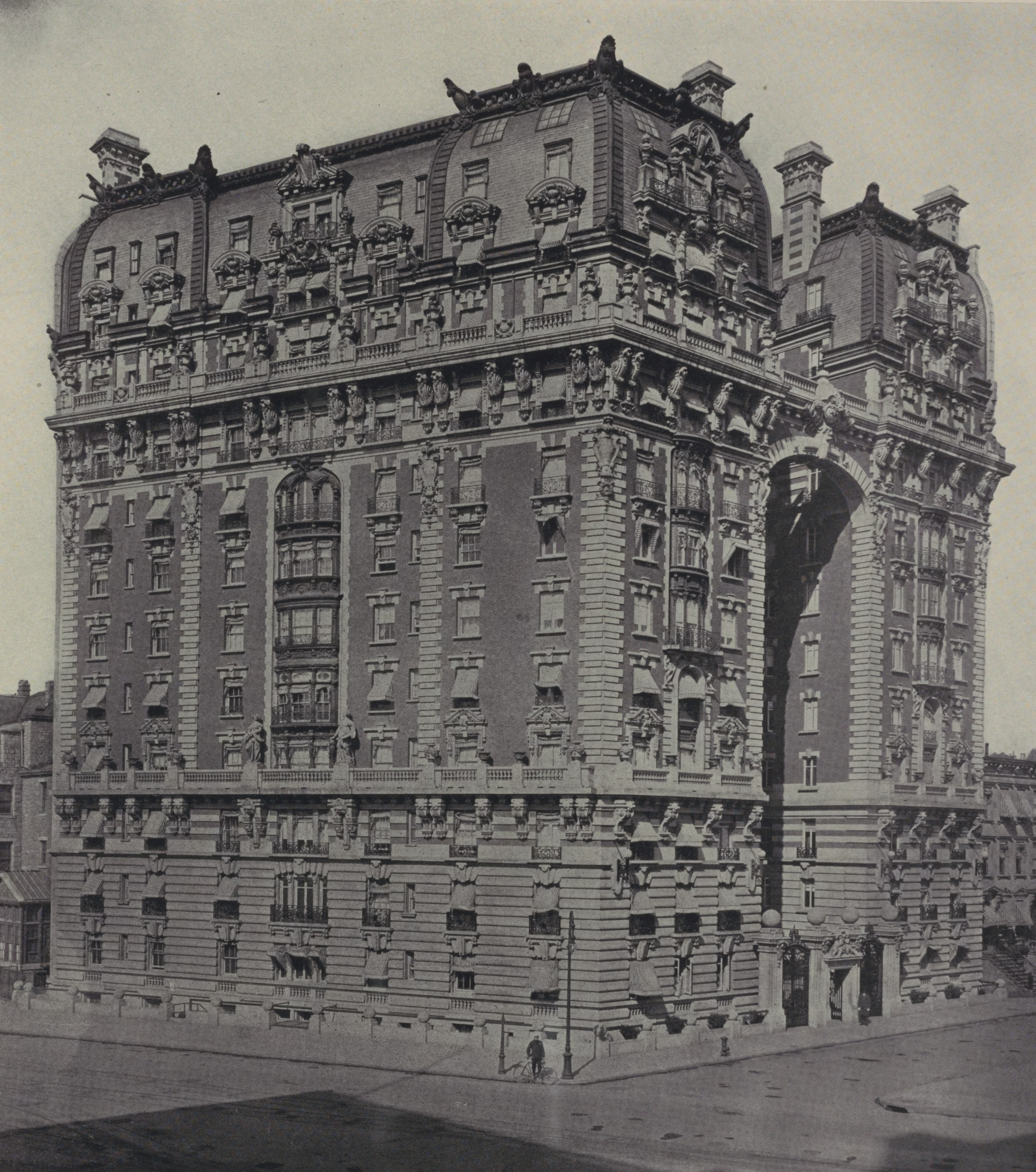
A view of the Dorilton in 1908, before the storefronts were added

Prior to the development of the Dorilton, its site was part of an 18th-century farming community called Harsenville; that community had been redeveloped into a residential neighborhood by the 1880s. The city's first subway line was developed starting in the late 1890s, and it opened in 1904 with a station at Broadway and 72nd Street. The construction of the subway spurred the development of high-rise apartment buildings on Broadway, such as the Ansonia and the Dorilton.

=== Apartment house ===
==== 1900s to 1920s ====
Before the routing of the subway line had been finalized, in early 1899, developer Hamilton M. Weed paid $175,500 for a plot on the corner of Broadway and 71st Street in February 1899. (Note: The New York Times gives an alternate figure of $275,000.) The media announced in February 1900 that Weed had bought the plot from Oppenheimer & Hamershlag and had hired the firm of Janes & Leo to design a twelve-story apartment hotel on the site. Weed had previously worked with Janes & Leo to develop townhouses in Upper Manhattan. The next month, Weed filed plans for the site; his firm, H. M. Weed & Co., built the structure. The Dorilton was designed as a larger version of the Alimar, an apartment building developed at 105th Street and West End Avenue, which Janes & Leo had also designed. Weed's development was one of several large apartment buildings developed on the Upper West Side in the early 1900s. The Metropolitan Life Insurance Company gave Weed a $725,000 construction loan for the site in February 1901 so Weed could complete the edifice.

The building was known as the Dorilton when it was completed in 1902 for $750,000. According to writer Elizabeth Hawes, the building's use of a name (as opposed to an address) was intended to "validate the decision to live in an apartment" and "give the building a sense of permanence and longevity and breeding". The elaborate design was intended to attract middle- and upper-class people who would have otherwise lived in townhouses. Weed sold the Dorilton in March 1902 to a group of investors from Buffalo, New York, and Providence, Rhode Island; the building was valued at $1.25 million. At the time, only one of the building's 48 units was vacant. The New York City Landmarks Preservation Commission (LPC) wrote that the building was frequented by musicians and actors. Among the building's early tenants were actress Bernice Golden, who was the ex-wife of F. Augustus Heinze, as well as businessman Henry Osborne Havemeyer. An ammonia tank in the building exploded in 1905, shortly after its completion. The building's owner, the Dorilton Corporation, filed plans in 1908 to renovate the first story by adding a new entrance with a canopy.

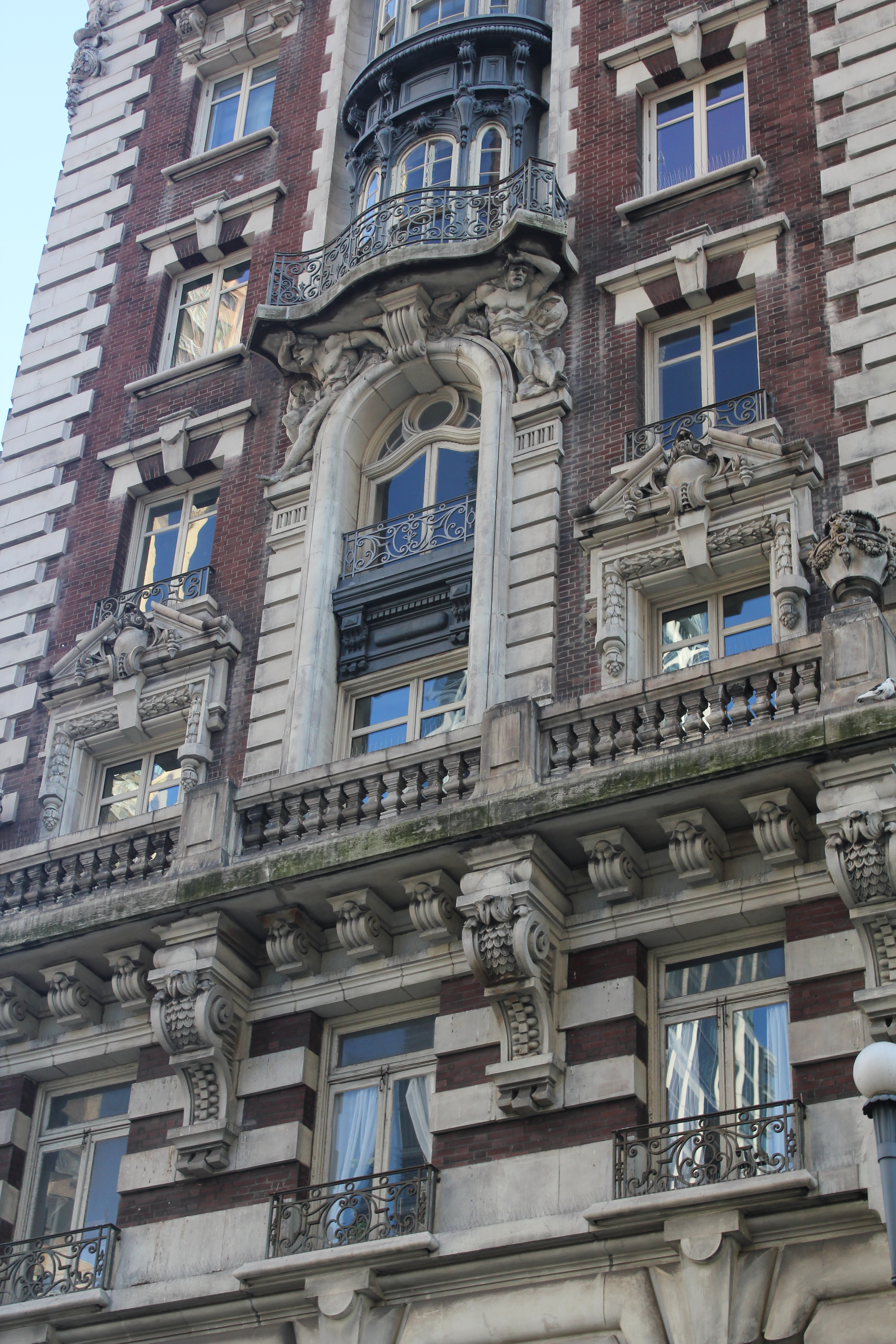
Decorative details of the Dorilton's upper stories, seen from 71st Street

The Dorilton Corporation sold the building in November 1915 to an investor, at which point the structure was valued at $1.5 million. The buyer, George Noakes, gave the Dorilton Corporation two apartment houses as partial payment. Noakes took over a $674,000 mortgage that had been placed on the property. Noakes resold the Dorilton in 1919 to Sydney H, Sonn, the president of the Transit Realty Company, at which point it was fully occupied and provided $111,000 a year in rental income. Subsequently, Sonn added storefronts and renovated the interior. Frederick Brown purchased the Dorilton in February 1923 at an assessed value of $1.5 million; by then, annual rental income from the building had increased to $200,000. Three months later, Brown resold the building to a syndicate of investors led by Max Raymond. The New-York Tribune reported that the building had six stores and 48 apartments.

==== 1930s to 1970s ====
The Dry Dock Savings Bank initiated foreclosure proceedings against the Dorilton in 1938, as the previous owners had failed to pay $1,263,904 on the mortgage. The bank acquired the building at a foreclosure auction that month. By October 1939, the building's managing agent reported that the Dorilton was fully rented. Isaac Prussin bought the building from the bank in 1945 at an assessed valuation of $900,000. At the time of Prussin's purchase, the building contained three stores, as well as 55 apartments with between four and seven rooms each. Prussin co-owned the Dorilton with Irving Stolz for five years. The men sold the building in February 1950 to a syndicate represented by Max Uviller; at the time, the building was worth $655,000.

One of the Dorilton's cornices was removed at some point after 1945, and many decorative elements were removed or had deteriorated by the 1950s. A syndicate led by Sam Sobel bought the building in 1956 at an assessed valuation of $700,000; they assumed the building's $440,000 mortgage and paid $260,000 in cash. The buyers planned to spend $150,000 on upgrading the elevators and installing a central air-conditioning system. At the time, the building's ground floor contained the Fifth Avenue Bar and the Stanwood Cafeteria, while the upper stories included 60 standard apartments and two penthouse apartments. The Dorilton's tenants by the 1960s included vocal coach Phil Moore, who operated a studio in the building. The LPC proposed designating the building's facade as a city landmark in May 1974 and voted that October to designate the building as a New York City landmark. The Dorilton was added to the National Register of Historic Places in 1983.

=== Co-op ===
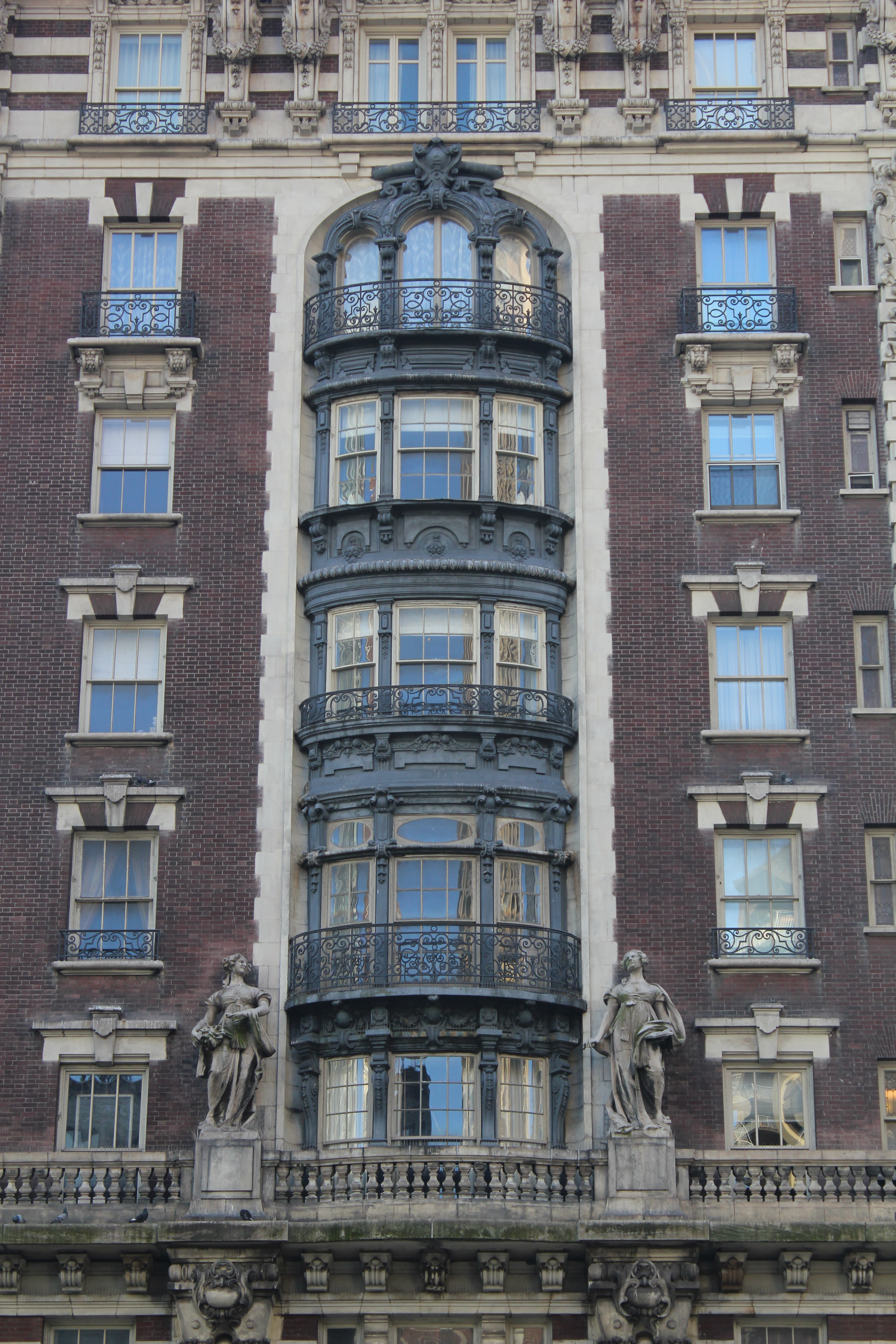
Oriel windows

The Dorilton became a housing cooperative in 1984. The next year, workers began renovating the Dorilton, particularly its roof; John Wright Stevens and Jonathan Williams were hired as the renovation architects. Stevens and Williams repainted the eleventh-story facade in a trompe-l'œil pattern, since there was not enough money to fund the restoration of cornices on the 10th and 11th stories. According to a shareholder for the co-op, this was the first time that the LPC had allowed a trompe-l'œil pattern to be installed in lieu of original ornamentation. The restoration of the roof, which included rebuilding the cresting and dormers, was completed in 1990 at a cost of $1.5 million. In addition, in the late 1980s, commercial landlord Crescent Properties bought the master lease for the stores at the Dorilton's base for $2.5 million. Crescent planned to divide a former doughnut shop at the building's base into three smaller storefronts that paid nearly twelve times as much monthly rent.

The exterior masonry, decorative terra-cotta work and chimneys and roof were restored in 1998 by the Walter B. Melvin architectural firm. The signage outside the building's storefronts was removed during the 1990s. During the first decade of the 21st century, interior designer Lucretia Moroni renovated the building's common spaces for $172,800. The project included installing new cast-iron benches in the entrance courtyard, as well as installing seats in the foyer and lobby, which had never previously had any seating areas. In addition, Moroni repainted the lobby's walls in pale green, complementing the courtyard's plantings, and repainted the stairways and walls in yellow. Among the residents of the co-op were actor Nathan Lane and newspaper publisher Arthur Sulzberger Jr..

== Critical reception ==
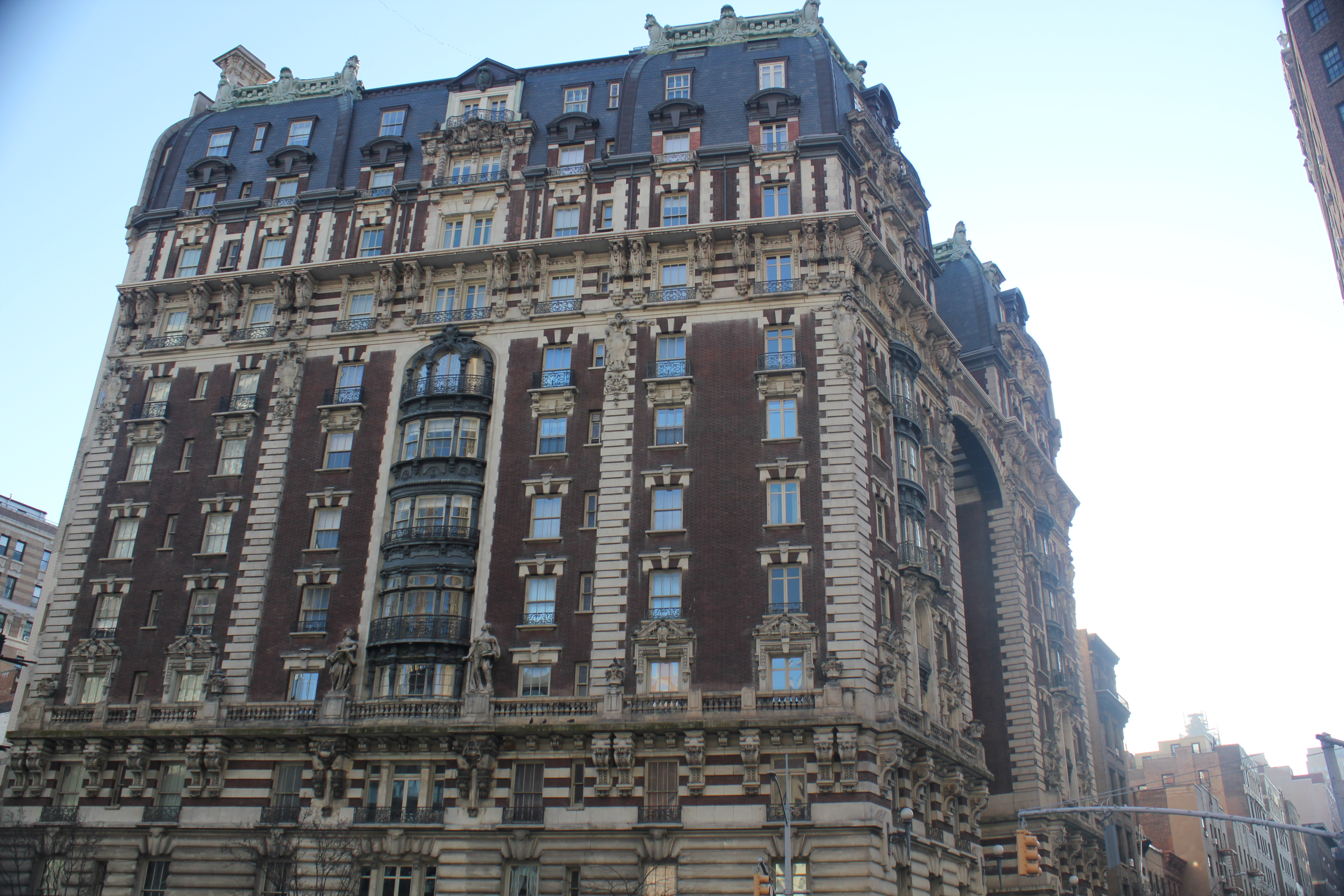
Seen from Broadway

When the building was under construction, the New-York Tribune wrote that "the imposing architecture of this lofty structure has, since the completion of its ornate facades and picturesque, domed roof, attracted the attention of every resident of the Upper West Side". Commentary was originally largely negative; as the writer Andrew Alpern stated in his 1992 book Luxury Apartment Houses of Manhattan, the building "was scorned by tradition-minded apartment seekers at the beginning of [the 20th] century". Montgomery Schuyler criticized the design in 1902, describing "the wild yell with which the fronts exclaim, 'Look at me,' as if somebody were going to miss seeing a building of this area, 12 stories high". Schuyler further regarded the roof as oversized, saying: "this roof, under pretence of being a roof, three full stories in tinware, including the parapet story, ostensibly of brick and stone, with scarcely any reduction in area from its substructure, and the fact would give it a squeezed and skintight look, no matter how it was treated in detail. But it is treated with extreme cruelty."

Modern critics viewed the building more favorably. In 1978, Peter Carlsen and Christopher Gray wrote for GQ magazine that "this fine madness, thought to be indigestible for decades, suddenly seems worth taking a little more seriously". Paul Goldberger wrote of the building the next year: "Now the building seems more to be pitied than censored, a rather too eager-to-please piece of Second Empire foppery", while another GQ article in 1979 described the Dorilton's design as "outlandish". In the 1983 book New York 1900, Robert A. M. Stern and his co-authors wrote that the building's "almost overblown Modern French" design contrasted with the "restrained, almost severe Classicism" of earlier townhouses designed by Janes & Leo. Architecture historian Andrew Dolkart regarded the Dorilton as "the most flamboyant apartment house in New York", with its striking, "French-inspired" sculpted figures and an enormous iron gate "reminiscent of those that guard French palaces." Architecture historian Francis Morrone considered it one of the city's great apartment buildings. The novelist Thane Rosenbaum wrote that the "white, ghostly faces" of the facade's sculptures "look not so much threatening as beleaguered".

== See also ==
- List of buildings and structures on Broadway in Manhattan
- List of New York City Designated Landmarks in Manhattan from 59th to 110th Streets
- National Register of Historic Places listings in Manhattan from 59th to 110th Streets
