= William R. Rhodes =

American banker

William Rhodes
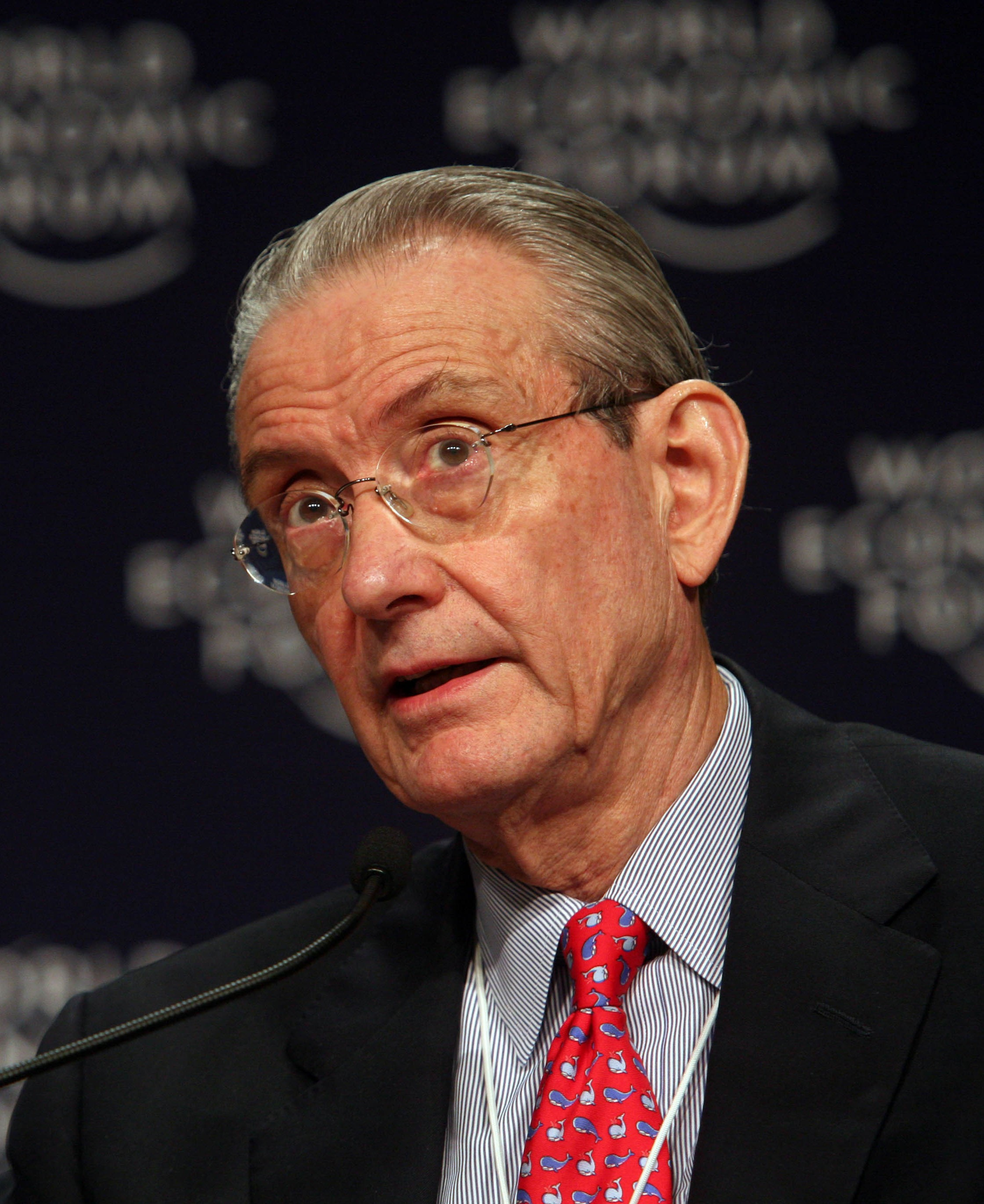
- Rhodes in 2011
- Born: William Reginald Rhodes; August 15, 1935 (age 91); New York City, New York, U.S.
- Education: Brown University (BA)
- Occupation: Banker

William Reginald "Bill" Rhodes (born August 15, 1935) is an American banker and philanthropist. Rhodes is president and CEO of William R. Rhodes Global Advisors, LLC which he founded in 2010. Having stepped back from full-time responsibilities with Citi after more than 53 years with the institution. He most recently served as senior advisor, senior vice chairman and senior international officer of Citigroup and chairman, president & CEO of Citibank, N.A. He held various senior executive positions at Citi from 1957 until his retirement from Citigroup on April 30, 2010. Subsequent to his retirement, he continued to serve as a senior advisor to Citi from 2010 through 2017.

== Early life and education ==
Rhodes was born August 15, 1935, in New York City, to parents Edward R. Rhodes and Elsie Rhodes. He attended secondary school at Northfield Mount Hermon School in Northfield, Massachusetts. After graduating from high school in 1953, Rhodes enrolled at Brown University, where he earned a Bachelor of Arts degree in history, graduating with the class of 1957.

Brown University presented Rhodes with an honorary Doctorate of Humane Letters (L.H.D.) on May 29, 2005. In 1969 he earned the Executive Award from the Graduate School of Credit and Financial Management at the Amos Tuck School of Business Administration of Dartmouth College.

== Career ==
=== Citigroup ===
==== Early years: 1957 to 1980 ====
Rhodes joined Citibank, N.A. in 1957 and was transferred in 1958 to the Maracaibo, Venezuela office as an Executive Trainee. In 1964, Rhodes was named Assistant Manager for Citibank in Caracas, Venezuela. In 1966 Rhodes became Assistant Manager in Jamaica and then Manager and Country Head for Citibank Jamaica in 1969. Throughout the 1970s, Rhodes continued to rise quickly within the Citi ranks being named Resident Vice President and Area Head for the Eastern Caribbean region in 1970, and then in 1971 he became Resident Vice President and subsequently Vice President for Venezuela and the Netherlands Antilles. In 1976 he was named Senior Vice President in charge of banking operations for Citi for the entire Caribbean and Northern South American regions. In 1977 Rhodes was named Senior Vice President of Latin America and the Caribbean based in the New York Office, and then became Senior Corporate Officer and a member of the banks policy committee for Latin America and Africa in 1980.

==== International debt crisis: 1984 to 2000 ====
In 1984 Rhodes was named Chairman of Citibank Restructuring Committee where he began to gain a reputation for international financial diplomacy as a result of his leadership in helping manage the external-debt crises that involved developing nations and their creditors worldwide. During that period he headed the advisory committees of international banks that negotiated debt-restructuring agreements for Argentina, Brazil, Iraq, Jamaica, Mexico, Nicaragua, Peru, and Uruguay.

In 1991 Rhodes was appointed Vice Chairman and Senior Risk Officer for Citicorp and Citibank, and held that position until the end of 2000.

In 1998, when the Republic of Korea experienced liquidity problems, he chaired the international bank group that negotiated the extension of short-term debt of the Korean banking system. In early 1999, at the request of the government of Brazil, he acted as worldwide coordinator to help implement the maintenance of trade and interbank lines by foreign commercial banks to Brazil. He has since served as a trusted advisor to governments, financial officials and corporations worldwide.

==== Later years: 2000 to 2017 ====
In May 1999, Rhodes was appointed as senior vice chairman of Citigroup, Inc., a position that he held until his retirement in 2010. In March 2003, he became chairman and later added responsibility and title of president of Citicorp, and Citibank, N.A., positions that he held until 2009. Mr. Rhodes announced his formal retirement from Citigroup on April 30, 2010, after more than 53 years.

Post his retirement in 2010, Rhodes continued to serve as senior advisor to Citi from 2010 through 2017.

=== Other positions ===
Rhodes served as the President of Chipco Inc. (part of the New York Clearing House), President of the Venezuela-American Chamber of Commerce, and President of the Bankers Association for Foreign Trade. He also served as the Chairman of the U.S. Advisory Committee of the Export-Import Bank of the United States, and of the U.S. Section of the Venezuela-U.S. Business Council. He served as a Director of Conoco Inc. from October 1998 to 2002, and then served as a Director of ConocoPhillips from August 2002 to May 5, 2008.

Rhodes served on the board of the Institute of International Finance Inc. (IIF) from 1989 until 2010. In 1993 Rhodes was elected Vice Chairman of the IIF and served in that position until being named First Vice Chairman, a position held from 2003 until 2010. He also served as Acting Chairman of the IIF on various occasions. In October 2010, he announced his retirement from the IIF board and was elected as its First Vice Chairman Emeritus, a position that he currently holds.

Rhodes served as the Chairman of the U.S.-Korea Business Council, and still serves as the Chairman Emeritus. He served as Chairman of Americas Society/Council of the Americas from 2000–2009, and still serves as a director and chairman emeritus.

Rhodes served as Chairman of the New York Blood Center during 1998 and 1999.

Rhodes was appointed Professor at Large for Brown University from 2010 through 2015.

=== Post-Citigroup ===
Rhodes established and is currently president and CEO of William R. Rhodes Global Advisors, LLC.

=== Current boards and appointments ===
- Director, Private Export Funding Corporation (PEFCO)
- Vice Chairman, National Committee on United States–China Relations
- Member, Group of Thirty
- Director, The Korea Society
- Current member of the Economic Club of New York and former member of the Board of Trustees
- Member, Advisory Council of the Brazilian American Chamber of Commerce
- First Vice Chairman Emeritus, Institute of International Finance
- Chairman Emeritus and Member, Board of Directors, Americas Society and Council of the Americas
- Life Trustee, New York Presbyterian Hospital
- Member, Emeriti of the Watson Institute for International and Public Affairs, Brown University
- Member, Council on Foreign Relations
- Director, Foreign Policy Association
- Chairman Emeritus, Board of Trustees, Northfield Mount Hermon School
- Member of the Chairman's Council and a Vice Chairman, Metropolitan Museum of Art Business Committee
- Chairman Emeritus, U.S.-Korea Business Council
- Member, Board of Directors of The Volcker Alliance
- Member, European American Chamber of Commerce New York
- Member, Chairman's Advisory Council and Senior Fellow, Hudson Institute

== Philanthropy ==
The William R. Rhodes Center for International Economics and Finance at Brown University was established in 2007 with the generous support of William R. Rhodes.

Rhodes also made a generous lead gift in 2008 to the Northfield Mount Hermon School for the Rhodes Arts Center, a 63,000 square foot state-of-the-art facility that opened in September 2008.

In 2014, Rhodes made the lead gift to establish The Rhodes Fellowship Course in Social Entrepreneurship at Northfield Mount Hermon School.

Rhodes is a major donor to the New York Presbyterian Hospital where he serves as a Life Trustee.

In 2017, Rhodes established the William Rhodes and Louise Tilzer-Rhodes Center for Glioblastoma at New York-Presbyterian. The center will conduct research and provide treatment and therapies to patients with glioblastoma.

== Awards and honors ==
- 1992 American Friends of Jamaica 1992 International Achievement Award.
- 1992 Export-Import Bank Advisory Committee Honors Award.
- 1993 LatinFinance "Man of the Year" Award. A yearly award given by the magazine to recognize individual achievements in finance.
- 1994 Brazilian American Chamber of Commerce "Person of the Year" Award. Honors two outstanding leaders (one Brazilian and one American) who have been particularly instrumental in forging closer ties between the two nations.
- 1996 FIFA (The Fédération Internationale de Football Association) Gold Medal
- 1997 The Americas Foundation "Americas Award". Presented to an outstanding individual committed to the ideals of reason, understanding, and humanity within the Americas.
- 1999 Arab Bankers Association of America Achievement Award. The award is presented to outstanding individuals in recognition of significant contributions to the fields of banking, investment and financial services.
- 1999 African American Institute Annual Award.
- 1999 Stephen P. Duggan Sr. Award for International Understanding. Institute of International Education (IIE) recognizes outstanding accomplishments in government and education by the award of the Institute’s Stephen P. Duggan Award, the highest honor of the Institute.
- 2000 Brown Club of NY Independent Award.
- 2000 IFR in London, "Lifetime Achievement" Award. The top accolade for an individual banker and only the second to be conferred by the publication. The award was presented to him by Princess Anne.
- 2000 Marshal Jozeph Pilzudki "Leadership & Achievement" Award. Awarded from the Pilzudki Institute of America.
- 2002 Foreign Policy Association Award for Global Social Responsibility
- 2003 Brown University Alumni Association William Rodgers Award. The award recognizes an outstanding alumna or alumnus whose service to society in general is representative of the words of the Brown Charter: living a life “of usefulness and reputation.” It recognizes important contributions to humankind made by Brown alumni anywhere in the world.
- 2003 Northfield Mount Hermon Lamplighter Award. The Lamplighter Award is the highest honor given to alumni whose work makes a difference for current and future students.
- 2004 Americas Society Gold Medal Award. The Gold Medal is Americas Society's highest honor, recognizing the recipients for their leadership and contributions to the worldwide business community, commitment to social and environmental responsibility, and active involvement with art and education initiatives across the Americas.
- 2004 Shared Interest 10th Anniversary Honorary Award - Investing in South Africa's future.
- 2004 Bankers Association for Finance and Trade "Banker of the Year" Award. Annual award given by BAFT which is an association for organizations actively engaged in international transaction banking.
- 2005 Honorary Doctorate of Humane Letters (L.H.D.), Brown University. Rhodes received the honorary doctorate degree from his alma mater, where he established the William R. Rhodes Center for International Economics and Finance.
- 2006 American Foundation for the University of West Indies Inaugural Bob Marley Award. The award recognizes individual excellence in the arts and culture.
- 2006 Casita Maria Fiesta Gold Medal Recipient.
- 2007 The America-Israel Friendship League Democracy Award. The AIFL is dedicated to promoting and strengthening the relationship between the people of the United States and Israel.
- 2007 The Banker's "Lifetime Achievement in Banking" Award. The Banker's first-ever Lifetime Achievement Award was presented to Rhodes at a ceremony held in London.
- 2008 LatinFinance "20 Years in Excellence" Award.To commend individuals who have made meaningful long term contributions to these markets.
- 2009 Recognized as Global Advisor to the President of the Republic of Korea by Lee Myung-Bak.
- 2009 Received certificate and badge of Dalian Honorary Citizen Award, and engaged as Senior Financial Advisor of Dalian Municipal Peoples Government by Mayor Li Wancai.
- 2009 One To World "World Fulbright Award for Global Corporate Leadership". Each year, One To World hosts the Fulbright Awards Dinner to honor those who, in the spirit of the late Senator J. William Fulbright, have furthered peace and international understanding through their lives and work.
- 2010 Foreign Policy Association Award. Recognizes individuals who demonstrate responsible internationalism and work to expand public knowledge of international affairs.
- 2011 American Banker "Lifetime Achievement" Award. American Banker‘s Banker of the Year/Best in Banking Awards recognize the people and the companies who set the highest standards of progress, innovation, and performance in banking and financial services.
- 2012 Boy Scouts of America Franklin D. Roosevelt Award. Annual award.
- 2012 US Sciences Po Foundation Prize. First ever awarded by the foundation to recognize extraordinary individuals who have demonstrated visionary leadership in solving global challenges, in the areas of diversity, social rights, economics and law.
- 2013 Pro Mujer "Lifetime Achievement" Award. Awarded for leadership in global finance.
- 2014 Ranked by Crain's as #11 out of 200 Most Connected New Yorkers.
- 2014 BRAVO Business "Legacy Award". The Legacy Award marks the 20th anniversary of BRAVO, honoring those individuals who have had a lasting and transformative impact on Latin America.
- 2015 Lotus Club Award of Distinction.
- 2018 Foreign Policy Association Medal

Rhodes is an Officer and Chevalier of France's Legion of Honor; and has received decorations from Poland, Korea, Brazil, Mexico, Argentina, Venezuela, Colombia, Panama and Jamaica; and multiple awards from not-for-profit organizations such as the Africa-America Institute, the Arab Bankers Association of North America and the America-Israel Friendship League in recognition of his contributions to international banking and finance.

== Published work ==
In 2011, McGraw-Hill published his book Banker to the World: Leadership Lessons From the Front Lines of Global Finance. The book is currently in its 2nd edition in English. A separate English edition was published in India and Sub Continent. The book has been translated and published in a number of languages including Mandarin, Korean, Japanese, Portuguese, and most recently two additions in Spanish.

=== Other published work ===
- Latin American debt outlook: remarks by William R. Rhodes (1987)
- Progress in LDC debt: reports by William R. Rhodes (1985)
- The debt crisis: Phase II (1985)
- A new phase for Latin American debt: remarks by William R. Rhodes (1984)
- International debt update: remarks by William R. Rhodes (1984)
- The outlook for Latin American debt (1983)
- Fiscal considerations for a private college satellite campus: the test of a conceptual framework for decision-making. (1974)

In addition, Rhodes has written numerous op-ed articles for many of the top-tier financial publications, including Financial Times, Wall Street Journal, Reuters, Bloomberg and New York Times, and often appears on business television programs, including CNBC, Bloomberg, CNN, Fox, Sky, BBC and CCTV (China).

== See also ==
- Group of Thirty
- Council of the Americas
- "In Crises, Rhodes Was the Man in the Middle", American Banker, November 30, 2011.
