= Music of the Americas (concert series) =

Concert series

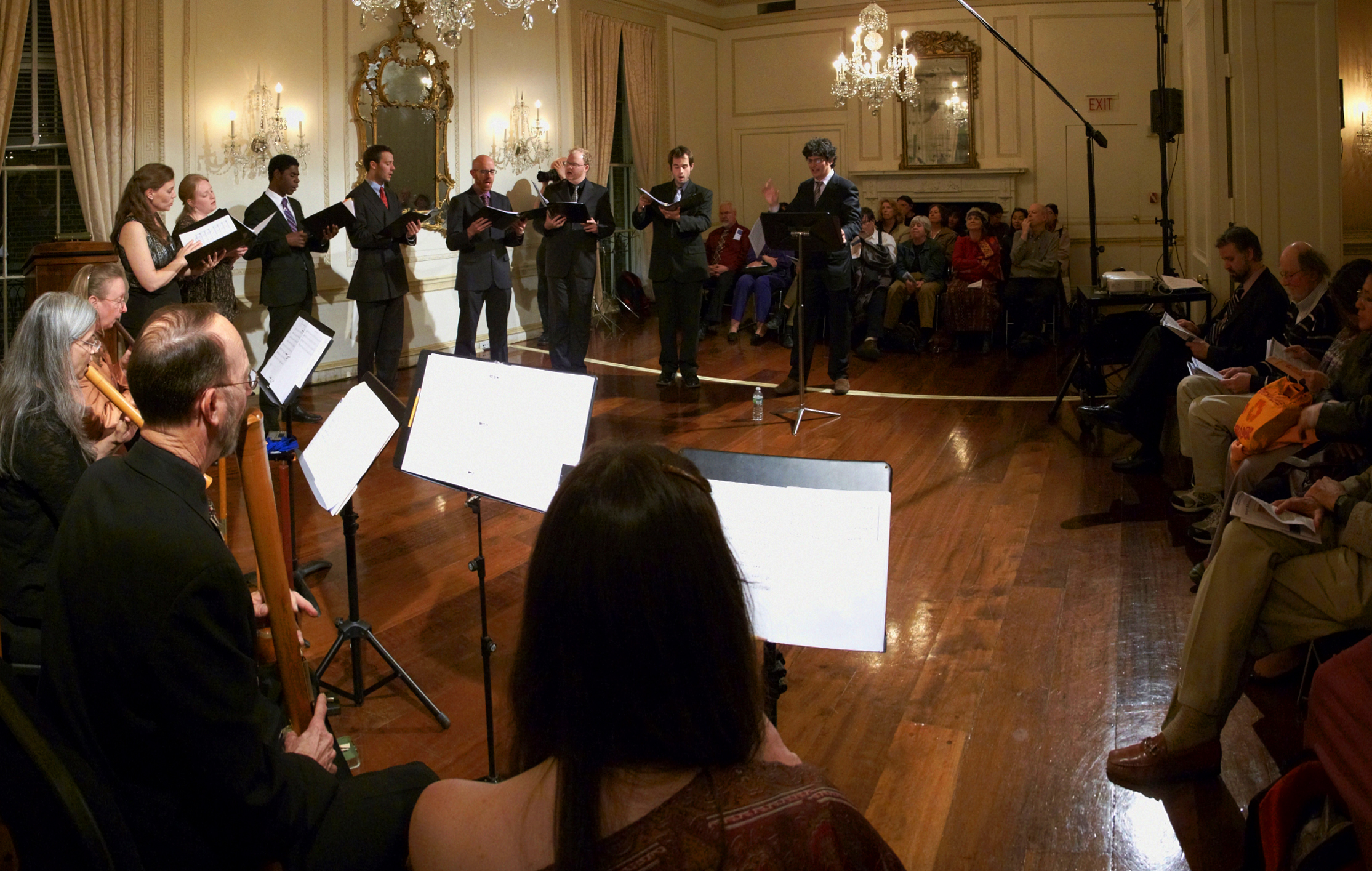
- Meridionalis at Americas Society
- Formation: 1965
- Headquarters: 680 Park Avenue; New York, NY 10065
- Website: musicoftheamericas.org

The Music of the Americas concert series has been presented by Americas Society since 1965 and seeks to showcase a wide range of artists and music from across the western hemisphere. In 2009, the series was renamed the MetLife Foundation Music of the Americas concert series. The music ranges from classical and folk to popular and contemporary in an effort to highlight the diversity of musical activity in the Americas. Since its inception in 1965, the Music of the Americas concert series has presented a wide range of internationally renowned artists, including Plácido Domingo, the Spanish Harlem Orchestra, Nelson Freire, Inti-Illimani, and Chango Spasiuk, as well as music not often presented elsewhere in the area. The Music of the Americas program has been under the direction of Sebastián Zubieta since 2005.

The concert series is free and takes place at Americas Society’s headquarters on the upper east side of New York City at 680 Park Avenue. The building, which has served as Americas Society’s headquarters since David Rockefeller created the organization, is a New York City landmark and listed in the National Register of Historic Places, and was previously the home of Percy Rivington Pyne II before serving as the Soviet Mission to the United Nations until its current usage. Along with the neighboring buildings of the Queen Sofía Spanish Institute and the Italian Consulate General, the house constitutes one of the few remaining unified architectural ensembles on Park Avenue.

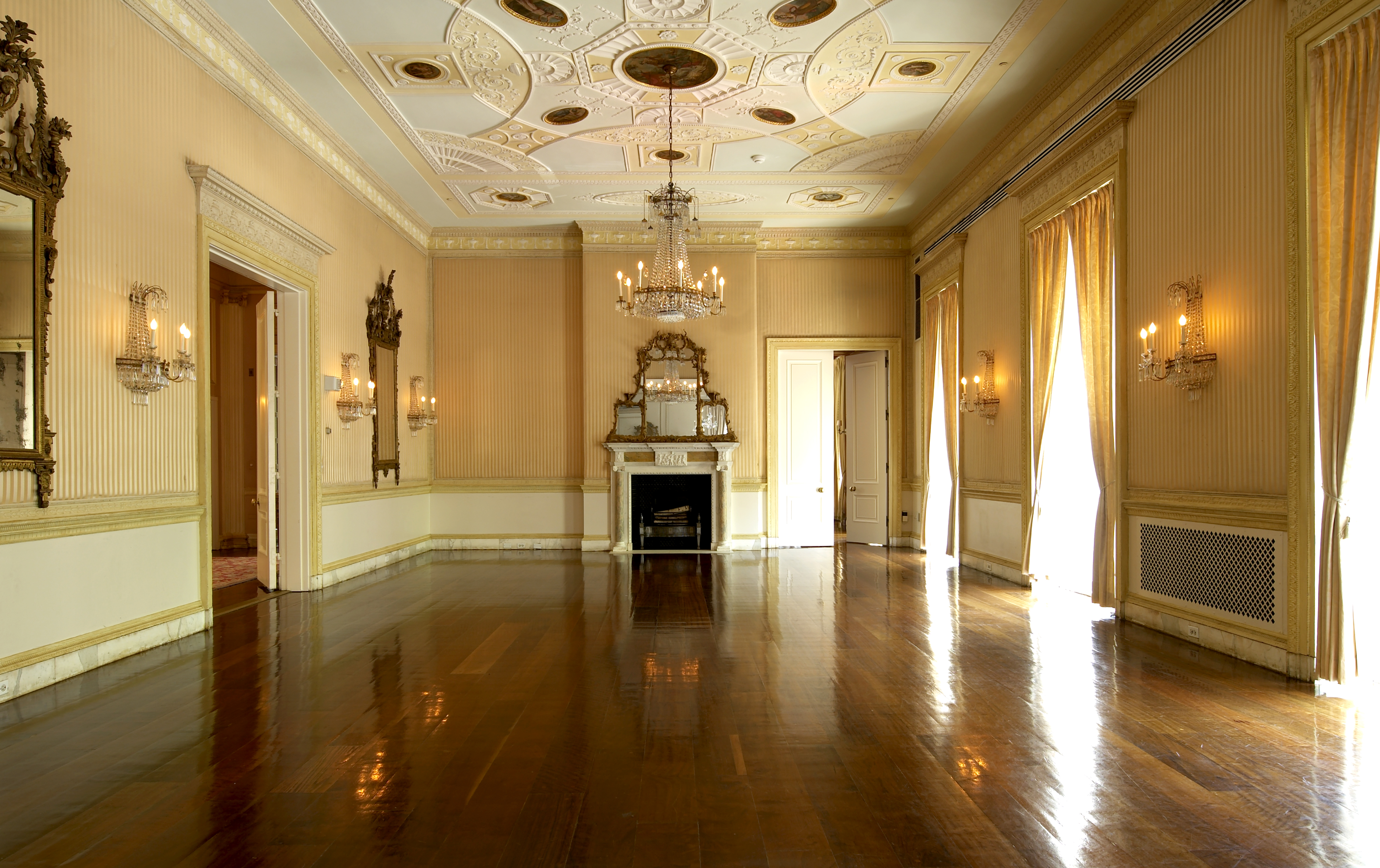
Salon Simón Bolivar

The primary venue in the building for the concert series is the Salon Simón Bolivar, an expansive room in the building’s Neo-Federal style with wide windows, a 15-foot ceiling, and wood-paneled and silk fabric walls.

== Music Notes ==
Music Notes

Music Notes is a series of online articles from the music department of Americas Society about the Music of the Americas concert series. The articles offer media from recent concerts and discuss issues and ideas brought up by the artists and music.

== Music of the Americas CD ==
The Americas Society music program produces a compilation CD that showcases artists from the past season. Artists on the 2010 CD include Larry Harlow, Inti-Illimani, and Eddy Marcano.
