= EACC =

EACC means:

- Effective accelerationism (e/acc), philosophical and political movements from the 2020s
- East African Coast Current, part of the Somali Current
- East Arkansas Community College, Forrest City, Arkansas, United States
- East Asian Character Code, the Chinese Character Code for Information Interchange
- Edinburgh Academical Cricket Club or Edinburgh Accies, a cricket club in Edinburgh, Scotland
- Ethics and Anti-Corruption Commission (established 2011), Kenya
- European Airlift Coordination Cell, improve the utilisation of European military air transport and aerial refueling capabilities
- European American Chamber of Commerce, an organization whose objective is to promote business between Europe and the United States
- European Assisted Conception Consortium
- Improved electric accessories (eACC), a commonly used automotive acronym
