= Henry P. Davison House =

- U.S. Historic district – Contributing property
- New York City Landmark
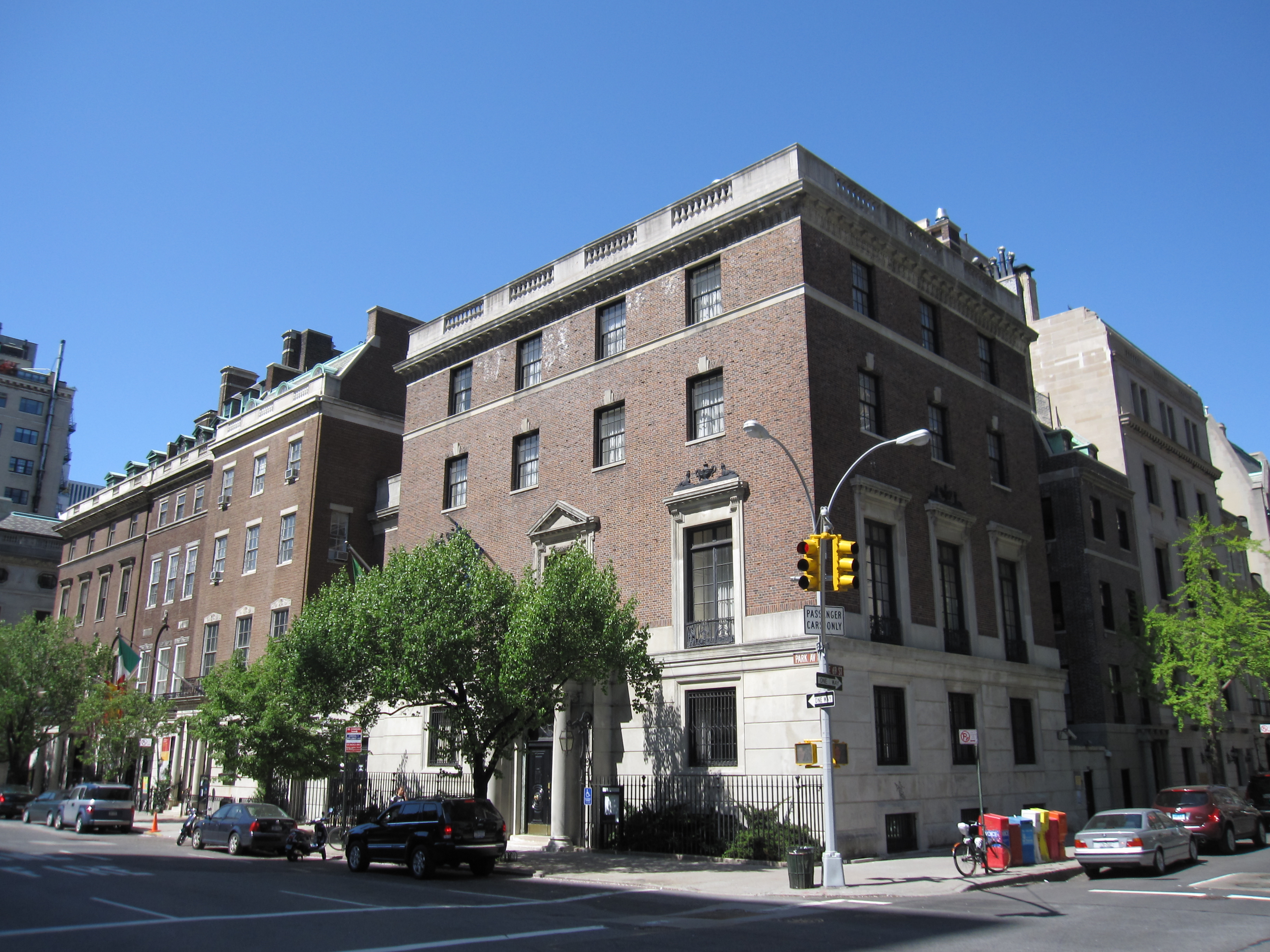
- Henry P. Davison House on Park Avenue

- Location within New York City Location within New York Location within the United States
- Location: 690 Park Ave, New York, New York
- Coordinates: 40°46′9″N 73°57′56″W
- Built: 1916-1917
- Architect: Walker & Gillette
- Architectural style: Neo-Federal, Georgian
- Part of: Park Avenue Houses (ID80002708)
- NYCL No.: 707

Significant dates
- Designated CP: January 3, 1980
- Designated NYCL: November 10, 1970

The Henry P. Davison House is a mansion located at 690 Park Avenue and 69th Street on the Upper East Side of Manhattan, New York City.

== History ==
It was constructed for the banker Henry P. Davison in 1917 by Walker & Gillette in the Neo-Georgian style.

The home was the site of Davison's daughter Alice's wedding to Artemus Gates in January 1922. It was later leased by Marshall Field as his New York residence. In 1925, Davison's widow sold the house to Anson Wood Burchard. The price was not disclosed at the time, but it had been assessed at $530,000 in 1923. After his death in 1927, it was the home his widow, the former socialite Allene Tew, who married German aristocrat Prince Heinrich, 33rd of Reuss in 1929 and used the home as their New York residence. It was later acquired by Harry Payne Bingham, who lived there with his third wife, Melissa Williams Yuille. Since 1952, the building has been the location of the Consulate General of Italy. In 2001, the official seal of the Italian consulate was stolen directly off the front door of the building.

=== Landmark status ===
The House was designated a landmark by the New York City Landmarks Preservation Commission in 1970. It was added to the National Register of Historic Places in 1980.

== Architecture ==
The Davison House is the northern terminus of the group of neo-Federal townhouses along the west side of Park, including the Percy R. Pyne House at 680 Park Avenue (today the home of the Americas Society) and the Oliver D. Filley House at 684 Park Avenue (now the Queen Sofía Spanish Institute).
