= Park Avenue =

North–south avenue in New York City

- Fourth Avenue, Union Square East, Park Avenue South
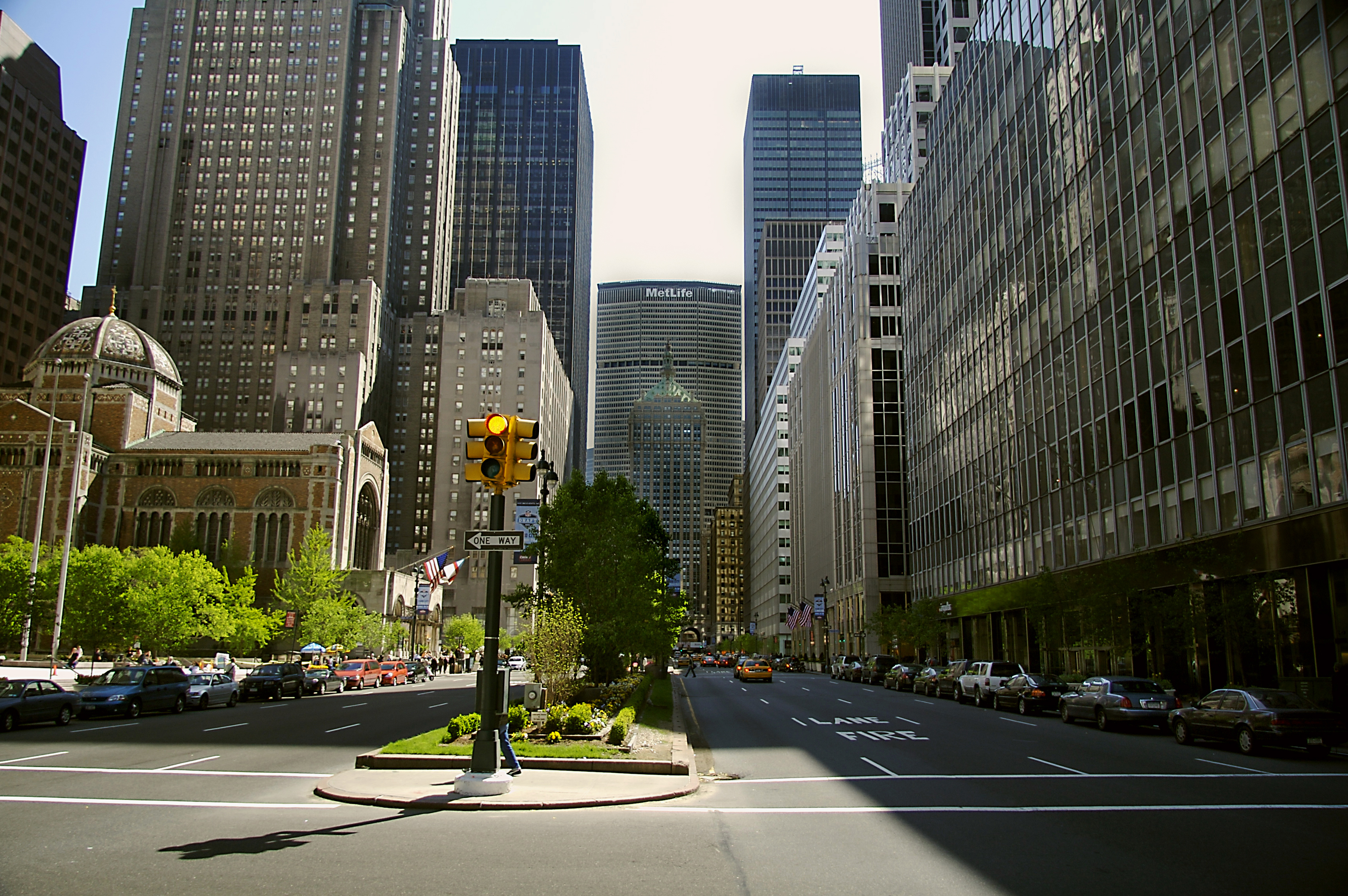
- Looking south from 52nd Street, facing the MetLife Building and Helmsley Building in the background with St. Bartholomew's Episcopal Church and Waldorf Astoria New York to the left
- Former name: Fourth Avenue
- Namesake: tracks between 34th and 40th Streets which were covered in grass
- Owner: City of New York
- Maintained by: NYCDOT
- Length: 10.9 mi (17.5 km)
- Location: Manhattan and The Bronx, New York City
- South end: Astor Place in Cooper Square
- Major junctions: Park Avenue Tunnel and Viaduct in East Midtown; Harlem River Drive in East Harlem
- North end: Third Avenue in Fordham
- East: Lexington Avenue
- West: Madison Avenue

Construction
- Commissioned: March 1811

Park Avenue is a boulevard in New York City that carries north and southbound traffic in the boroughs of Manhattan and the Bronx. For most of the road's length in Manhattan, it runs parallel to Madison Avenue to the west and Lexington Avenue to the east. Park Avenue's entire length was formerly called Fourth Avenue; the title still applies to the section between Cooper Square and 14th Street. The avenue is called Union Square East between 14th and 17th streets, and Park Avenue South between 17th and 32nd streets.

== History ==
=== Early years and railroad construction ===
Because of its designation as the widest avenue on Manhattan's East Side, Park Avenue originally carried the tracks of the New York and Harlem Railroad built in the 1830s, just a few years after the adoption of the Manhattan street grid. The railroad's right-of-way at ground level forced foot and carriage traffic onto either side of the tracks. Later on, the railroad was run through an open cut tunnel under Murray Hill, which was then covered with grates and grass between 34th and 40th Street in the early 1850s. A section of this "park" was later renamed Park Avenue in 1860. Park Avenue's original southern terminus was at 34th Street, and the newly renamed Park Avenue was given its own house-numbering system separate from that of Fourth Avenue. The address 1 Park Avenue was assigned to a house at 101 East 34th Street, at the northeast corner of Park Avenue and 34th Street.

The Harlem Railroad was later incorporated into the New York Central Railroad, and a terminal for the New York Central at 42nd Street, the Grand Central Depot, opened in 1871. But the tracks laid to the new terminal proved problematic. There were originally no grade-separated crossings of the railroads between 42nd and 59th Streets. As such, they required railroad crossings along Fourth Avenue, which resulted in frequent accidents; seven people died within 12 days of the Hudson River Railroad's move to Grand Central.

In 1872, shortly after the opening of Grand Central Depot, New York Central owner Cornelius Vanderbilt proposed the Fourth Avenue Improvement Project. The tracks between 48th and 56th Streets were to be moved into a shallow open cut, while the segment between 56th and 97th Streets, which was in a rock cut, would be covered over. (Note: The line entered fully enclosed brick tunnels between 67th and 71st Streets, and between 80th and 96th Streets. The remainder of this segment was located in a "beam tunnel" structure, which were mostly open-air, except where cross-streets traversed the cut on steel-beam bridges.) After the improvements were completed in 1874, the railroads, approaching Grand Central Depot from the north, descended into the Park Avenue Tunnel at 96th Street and continued underground into the new depot. As part of the project, Fourth Avenue was transformed into a boulevard with a median strip that covered the railroad's ventilation grates. Eight footbridges crossed the tracks between 45th and 56th Streets, and there were also vehicular overpasses at 45th and 48th Streets. The boulevard north of Grand Central was renamed Park Avenue in 1888.

=== Grand Central and Terminal City ===
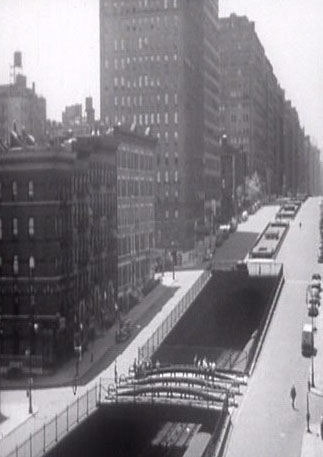
The railroad tunnel in 1941

A fatal collision between two trains occurred under Park Avenue in 1902, in part because the smoke coming from the steam trains obscured the signals. The New York state legislature subsequently passed a law to ban all steam trains in Manhattan. By December 1902, as part of an agreement with the city, New York Central agreed to put the approach to Grand Central Station from 46th to 59th Streets in an open cut under Park Avenue, and to upgrade the tracks to accommodate electric trains. Overpasses would be built across the open cut at most of the cross-streets. The new electric-train terminal, Grand Central Terminal, was opened in 1913.

After the electric trains were buried underground, the area around Park Avenue in the vicinity of Grand Central was developed into several blocks worth of prime real estate called Terminal City. Stretching from 42nd to 51st Streets between Madison and Lexington Avenues, it came to include the Chrysler Building and other prestigious office buildings; luxury apartment houses along Park Avenue; and an array of high-end hotels that included the Marguery, Park Lane, and Waldorf Astoria. In 1929, New York Central built its headquarters in a 34-story building (now called the Helmsley Building), straddling Park Avenue north of the terminal.

The Park Avenue Viaduct reroutes Park Avenue around Grand Central Terminal between 40th and 46th Streets, allowing Park Avenue traffic to traverse around the building and over 42nd Street without encumbering nearby streets. The western (now southbound) leg of the viaduct was completed in 1919, but congestion developed soon after the viaduct's opening, so an eastern leg for northbound traffic was added in 1928.

=== 20th century ===
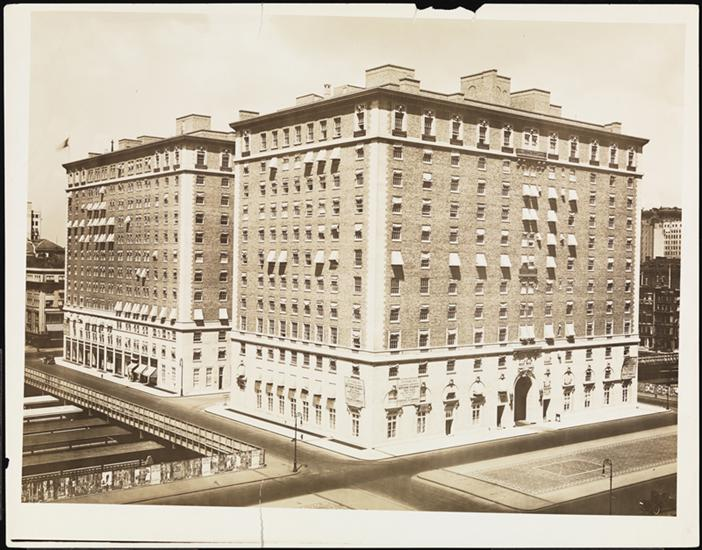
Old Hotel Marguery on Park Avenue, flattened in the 1950s to make way for the Union Carbide Building

The developer Henry Mandel acquired the lots on the eastern side of Fourth Avenue between 32nd and 33rd Street in 1923 under the name "One Park Avenue Corporation". To ensure his corporate name was accurate, Mandel asked the New York City Board of Aldermen to move Park Avenue's southern terminus to 32nd Street. The change went into effect on December 1, 1924, and address numbers along Park Avenue were changed accordingly. The previous house numbered 1 Park Avenue was occupied by Martha Bacon, widow of diplomat Robert Bacon, who led the opposition to the renumbering. The Board of Aldermen summarily overturned the name change, but Mayor John Hylan vetoed the move in April 1925. This prompted Bacon to appeal the decision to the New York Supreme Court, Appellate Division, which overturned Hylan's veto in November 1927, on the basis that the extension of Park Avenue to 32nd Street had been made for the benefit of a developer. Mandel's development at 32nd Street was thus known as 461–477 Fourth Avenue, and the developers of that building sued to reverse the appellate ruling. The New York Court of Appeals, the state's highest court, reversed the appellate ruling in February 1928. Bacon contemplated bringing up the matter with the United States Supreme Court, but she ultimately relented, changing her address to "Park Avenue at 34th" by 1930.

In 1927, the medians on Park Avenue north of Grand Central were trimmed to add one lane of traffic in each direction. This project eliminated the pedestrian path on the medians, as they became much narrower. The median was extended by one block from 96th Street to 97th Street in 1941, creating the only remaining median on Park Avenue with a pedestrian path and seating. In the 1920s the portion of Park Avenue from Grand Central to 96th Street saw extensive apartment building construction. This long stretch of the avenue contains some of the most expensive real estate in the world. Real estate at 740 Park Avenue, for example, sells for several thousand dollars per square foot.

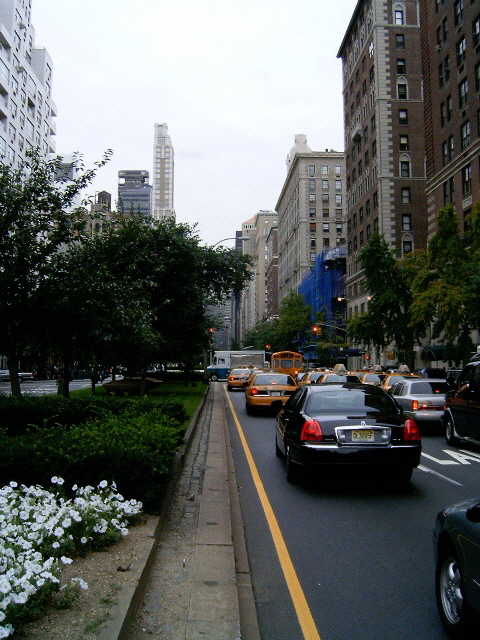
Park Avenue on the Upper East Side

In October 1937, a part of the Murray Hill Tunnel was reopened for road traffic. Efforts to promote a Grand Park Avenue Expressway to Grand Concourse in the Bronx were unsuccessful.

A tradition was introduced in 1945 as a memorial to American soldiers killed in action, whereby Christmas trees are placed in the median and lit up on the first Sunday in December at Brick Presbyterian Church. On May 5, 1959, the New York City Council voted 20–1 to change the name of Fourth Avenue between 17th and 32nd Streets to Park Avenue South. The renaming, along with a ban on overhanging signs along the newly renamed Park Avenue South, was intended to improve the character of the avenue. Unlike with the earlier renamings of Park Avenue, the address numbers of Park Avenue South continued from those on the remaining section of Fourth Avenue. The Pan Am Building (now MetLife Building), in between the Park Avenue Viaduct's legs north of Grand Central Terminal, was opened in 1963.

=== 21st century ===
In September 2007, the Metro-North Railroad reached an agreement with the New York City Department of Transportation (NYCDOT) to install pedestrian traffic signals along Park Avenue between 46th Street and 56th Street. The two sides had feuded over the issue since 1982, when Penn Central controlled the Park Avenue Tunnel. In 1997, the NYCDOT commissioner stated that signals would be installed during an upcoming phase of reconstruction in the Grand Central area. The $35 million project, whose cost was split between Metro-North and the city, was approved by the MTA Board later that month. It called for the installation of 12 pedestrian signals and 8 traffic signals at the eleven intersections and the renovation of the sidewalks and streets around Grand Central to prevent rainwater from seeping into the tunnel. Car traffic in this area had been controlled by traffic lights on a pole at each intersection in the middle of the median, instead of the usual four from each direction, resulting in a relatively high rate of pedestrian injuries. Additional traffic lights and pedestrian signals had not been added because this area of Park Avenue was located directly atop the roof of the Park Avenue Tunnel, with the street being 8 inches (20 cm) above the roof in some locations. Because the roof was 18 to 24 inches (46 to 61 cm) thick, there was not enough room to provide a foundation for the traffic poles without puncturing the structure. Due to the high cost of making these upgrades, and the lack of cooperation between the New York City Department of Transportation and Metro-North, which had opposed any solution that would modify the tunnel roof, the project was delayed for several years. The project had been estimated to cost $200,000 per intersection in 1994. As part of the new agreement, Metro-North designed a way to anchor the traffic signals in the deck and tunnel roof. Pedestrian signals and gantry-mounted traffic signals were installed at these intersections in July 2010.

On March 12, 2014, two apartment buildings near 116th Street, 1644 and 1646 Park Avenue, were destroyed in a gas explosion. Eight people were killed and many others were injured.

In 2019, the Metropolitan Transportation Authority provided funding for repairs to the roof of the Grand Central Terminal train shed. The train shed is located under Park Avenue and surrounding streets from 43rd to 57th Street, and the repairs to the train shed's roof involved reconstructing parts of Park Avenue. In August 2024, the city government began soliciting bids for the reconstruction of Park Avenue's median between 46th and 57th Streets. The project was to include additional plantings, benches, and concessions. In April 2026, the city announced preliminary designs for redesigning Park Avenue from 46th to 57th Streets, which entailed removing two lanes in each direction and creating an enlarged median for a park-like pedestrian walkway. That September, the city government updated the proposed redesign to add a protected two-way bike lane.

== Route ==
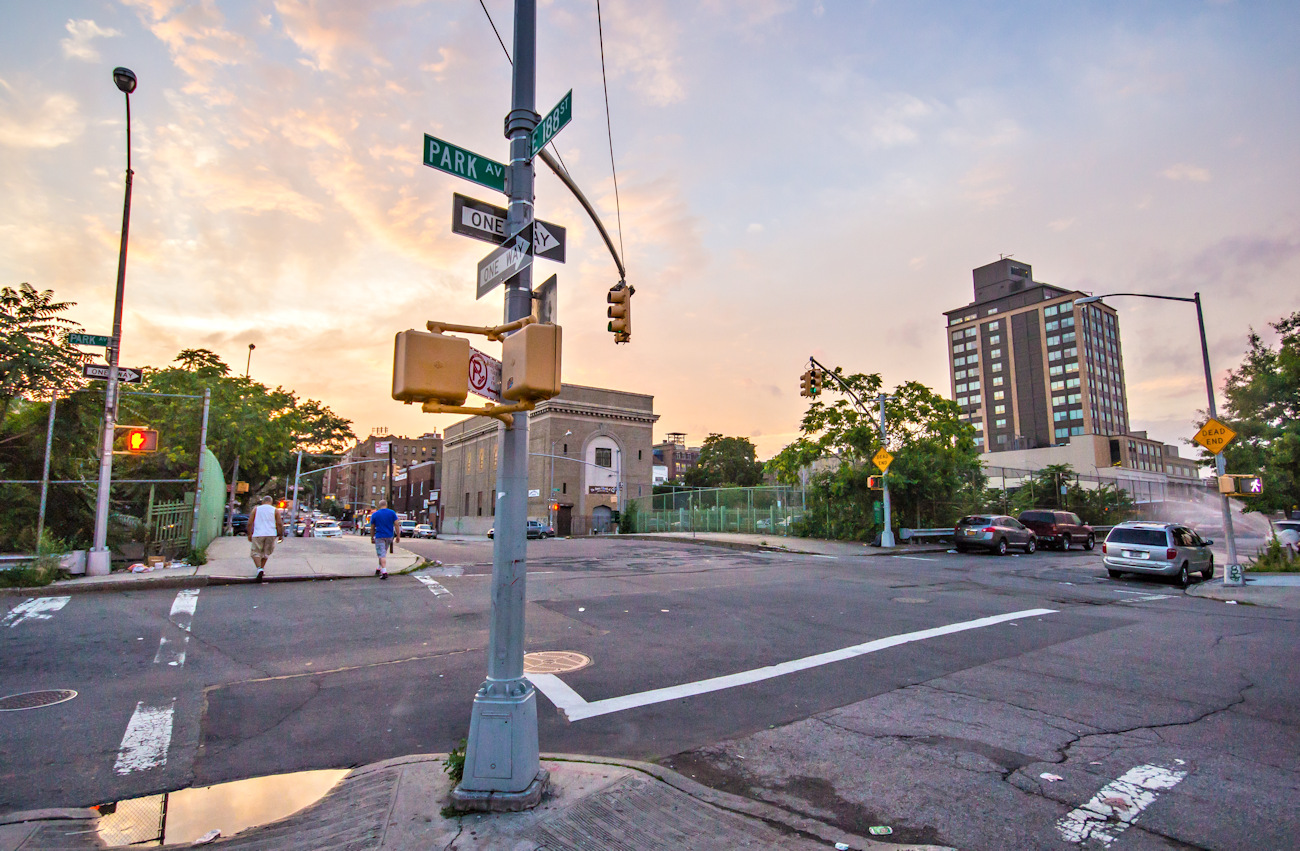
Park Avenue in Belmont, Bronx, near Fordham Plaza

=== Manhattan ===
The road that becomes Park Avenue originates at the Bowery. From Cooper Square at 8th Street to Union Square at 14th Street, it is known as Fourth Avenue, a 70-foot-wide (21 m) road carrying northbound traffic. At 14th Street, it turns slightly northeast to align with other avenues as drawn in the Commissioners' Plan of 1811. From 14th Street to 17th Street, it forms the eastern boundary of Union Square and is known as Union Square East; its southbound lanes merge with Broadway south of 15th Street, and the thoroughfare divides into two distinct portions in the one-block section between 14th and 15th Streets. From 17th Street to 32nd Street, it is known as Park Avenue South. Address numbers on Park Avenue South are a continuation of those on Fourth Avenue; for example, 225 Park Avenue South was originally known as 225 Fourth Avenue.

Above 32nd Street, for the remainder of its distance, it is known as Park Avenue, a 140-foot-wide (43 m) boulevard. The address numbers for Park Avenue are reset above 32nd Street; for example, the address 1 Park Avenue would ordinarily have been numbered 461 Fourth Avenue. Between 33rd Street and 40th Street, the leftmost northbound lane descends into the Murray Hill Tunnel. North of 40th Street, the center lanes of Park Avenue rise onto an elevated structure that goes around Grand Central Terminal and the MetLife Building (formerly the Pan Am Building), carrying each direction of traffic on opposite sides of the buildings. The bridge, one of two structures in Manhattan known as the Park Avenue Viaduct, returns to ground level at 46th Street after going through the Helmsley Building (also referred to as the New York Central Building or 230 Park Avenue). The IRT Lexington Avenue Line runs under this portion of the street. Once the line reaches Grand Central–42nd Street, it shifts east to Lexington Avenue.

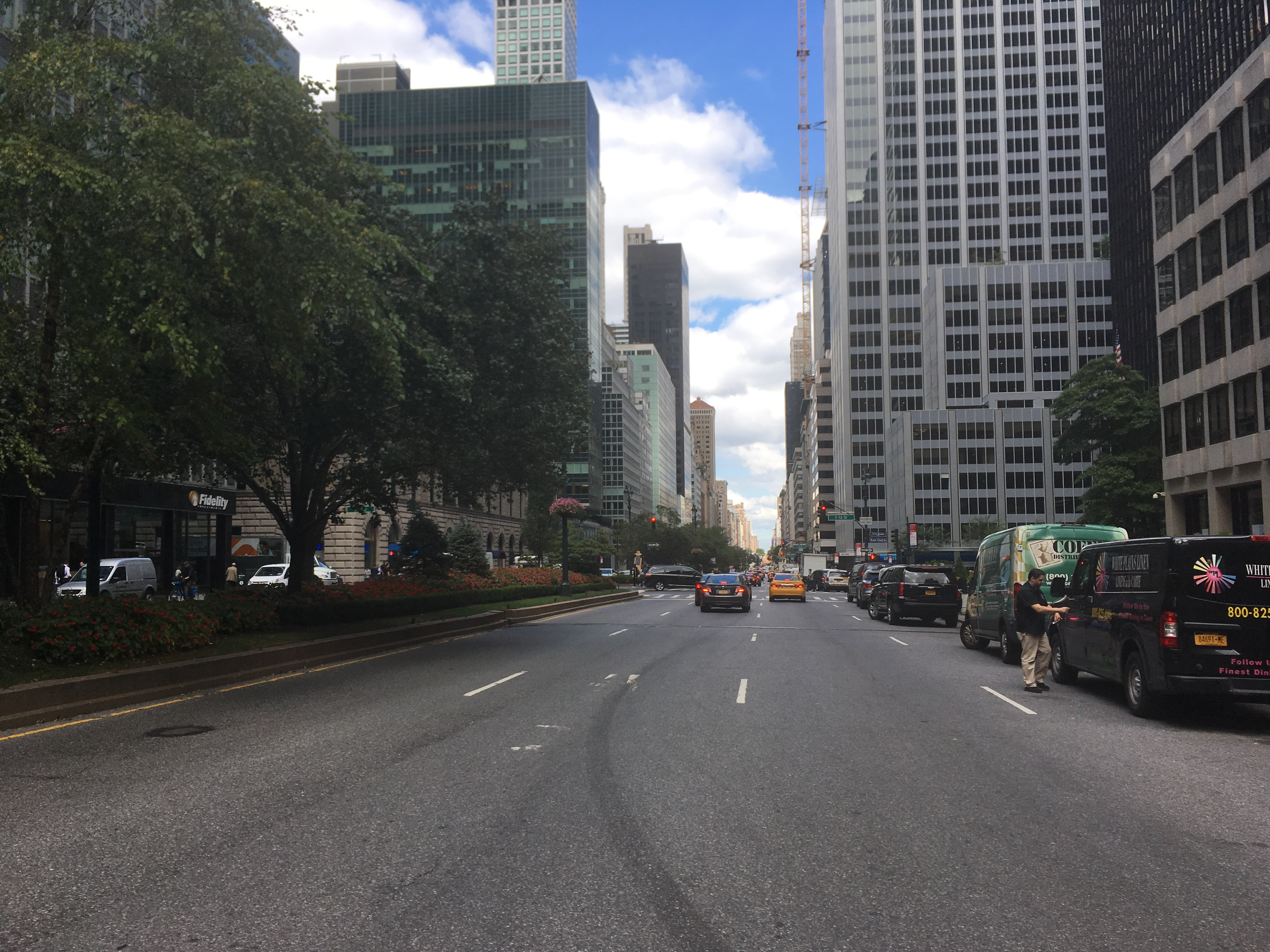
Park Avenue northbound past 51st Street in Midtown Manhattan

As Park Avenue enters Midtown north of Grand Central Terminal, it is distinguished by many glass-box skyscrapers that serve as headquarters for corporations and investment banks such as Société Générale, JPMorgan Chase at 270 Park Avenue and 277 Park Avenue, UBS at 299 Park Avenue, Citigroup at 399 Park Avenue, Colgate-Palmolive, and MetLife at the MetLife Building. From 47th to 97th Streets, the tracks for Metro-North Railroad's Park Avenue main line run in the Park Avenue Tunnel underneath Park Avenue. The section of Park Avenue through the Upper East Side is lined with apartment buildings, some of which are encompassed by the Park Avenue Historic District. At 97th Street, the tracks come above ground, rising onto the other Manhattan structure known as the Park Avenue Viaduct. The first street to pass under the viaduct is 102nd Street; from there to the Harlem River the railroad viaduct runs down the middle of Park Avenue. Park Avenue in Manhattan ends north of 132nd Street, with connections to the Harlem River Drive.

The flowers and greenery in the median of Manhattan's Park Avenue are privately maintained, by the Fund for Park Avenue. The begonia was specifically chosen by the Fund's gardeners because there is no automatic watering system and the floral variety is resilient under hot sun rays.

=== The Bronx ===
The avenue is continued on the other side of the river in the Bronx. In the Bronx, Park Avenue begins at East 135th Street in the Mott Haven neighborhood. The entire avenue is divided by Metro-North's own right of way in the borough. Between East 135th Street to Fordham Plaza where it ends, Park Avenue is one way only in either direction in most sections.

== Businesses ==
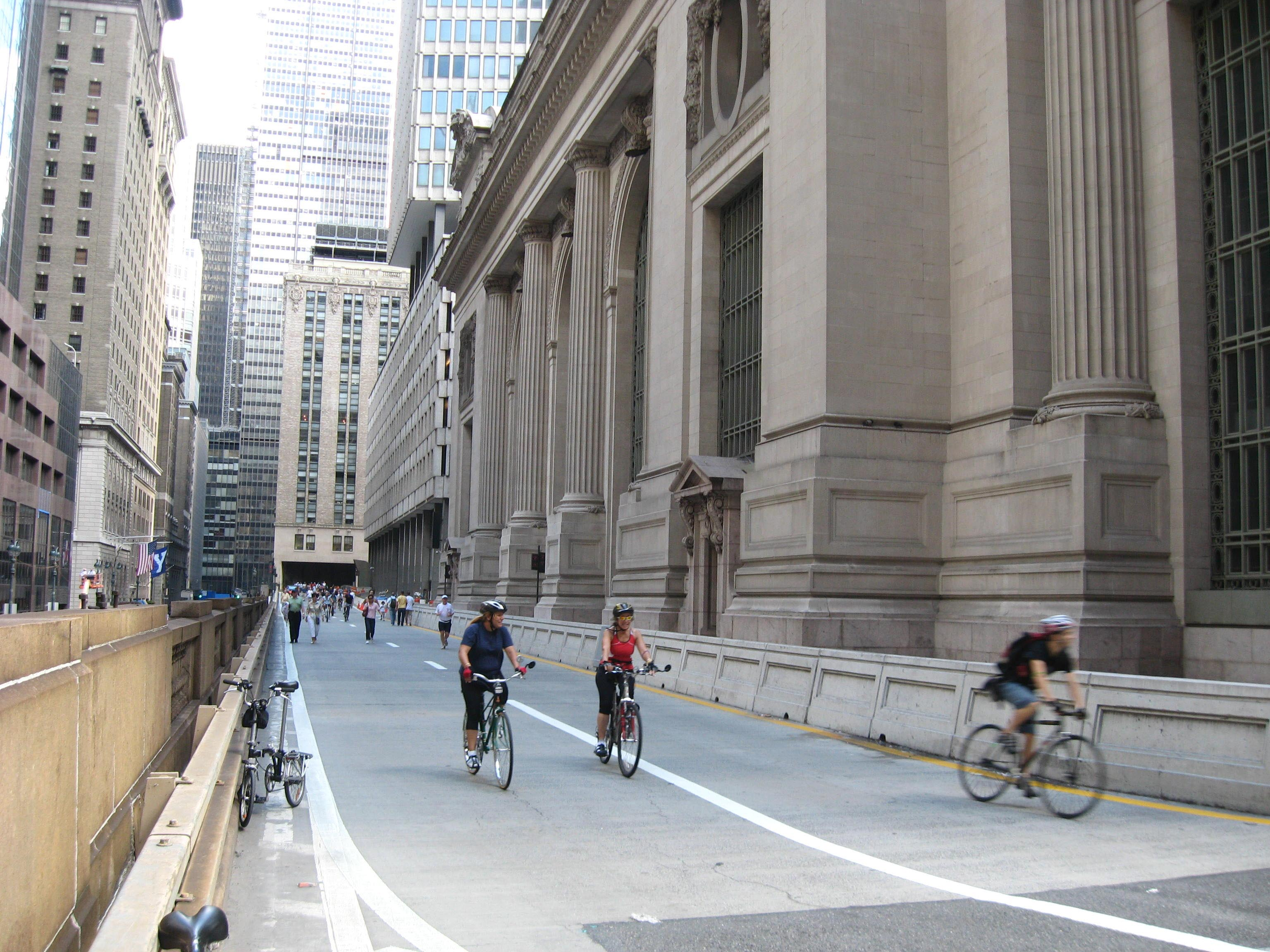
Park Avenue Viaduct, during the 2008 Summer Streets event

The following institutions are either headquartered or have significant business presences on Park Avenue:

- Arconic
- American Airlines at 2 Park Ave.
- Americas Society
- Asia Society
- Bankers Trust
- The Blackstone Group at 345 Park Ave.
- Bristol Myers Squibb
- British Airways at 2 Park Ave.
- Cantor Fitzgerald at 499 Park Ave.
- Citigroup at 399 Park Ave.
- Colgate-Palmolive at 300 Park Ave.
- Council on Foreign Relations
- Credit Suisse at 324 Park Ave.
- C. V. Starr at 90 Park Ave.
- Deutsche Bank
- Digitas
- Environmental Defense Fund
- EXL Service
- FactSet at 90 Park Ave.
- Ferrari
- Heineken International
- Hilb, Rogal & Hobbs Co.
- Hachette Book Group USA at 237 Park Ave.
- Houlihan Lokey at 245 Park Ave.
- Hunter College
- JPMorgan Chase & Co. at 270 Park Ave.
- KPMG
- Leucadia National
- Lenox Hill Hospital
- Major League Baseball
- Maserati
- Mercedes-Benz
- MetLife at 200 Park Ave.
- M&T Bank
- Mutual of America at 320 Park Ave.
- The National Football League
- Needham & Company
- New York Life
- Oneworld at 2 Park Ave.
- Piper Jaffray at 345 Park Ave.
- Raymond James at 320 Park Ave.
- Reed Elsevier
- Sanofi-Aventis
- Seligman
- Sefaria
- Skydance Corporation at 230 Park Ave.
- Société Générale
- Tata Consultancy Services
- Twitch Interactive, Inc.
- Vivendi SA
- UBS at 299 Park Ave.
- The Waldorf-Astoria Hotel at 301 Park Ave.

== Notable structures ==
In south to north order:

- Daryl Roth Theatre
- 44 Union Square
- Everett Building, 200 Park Avenue South
- W New York Union Square, 201 Park Avenue South
- 225 Park Avenue South
- Church Missions House, 281 Park Avenue South
- United Charities Building, 287 Park Avenue South
- 300 Park Avenue South
- Metropolitan Life North Building, 324 Park Avenue South
- New York Life Building, 364–378 Park Avenue South
- 2 Park Avenue –designed by Ely Jacques Kahn
- 3 Park Avenue
- 4 Park Avenue, formerly the Vanderbilt Hotel
- Robb House, 41 Park Avenue
- Adelaide L. T. Douglas House, 57 Park Avenue
- Scandinavia House – The Nordic Center in America, 58 Park Avenue
- Our Saviour Roman Catholic Church, 59 Park Avenue
- Union League Club
- 101 Park Avenue
- Pershing Square Building, 125 Park Avenue
- Grand Central Terminal (actually in Park Avenue, between the Park Avenue Viaduct's two roadways)
- MetLife Building, 200 Park Avenue
- Helmsley Building, 230 Park Avenue
- 245 Park Avenue
- 270 Park Avenue – replaced the Union Carbide Building
- 277 Park Avenue
- 299 Park Avenue
- Waldorf Astoria New York, 301 Park Avenue
- St. Bartholomew's Episcopal Church
- 345 Park Avenue
- Racquet and Tennis Club, 370 Park Avenue
- Park Avenue Plaza
- Seagram Building, 375 Park Avenue –designed by Mies van der Rohe
- Lever House, 390 Park Avenue –designed by Gordon Bunshaft
- 399 Park Avenue
- 425 Park Avenue
- 432 Park Avenue – At completion in 2015, was the tallest residential building in the world
- Ritz Tower, 465 Park Avenue
- Halstead Property, 499 Park Avenue
- 500 Park Avenue
- Trump Park Avenue, 502 Park Avenue
- Central Presbyterian Church, 593 Park Avenue
- 620 Park Avenue
- Seventh Regiment Armory, 643 Park Avenue
- 655 Park Avenue
- Harold Pratt House, 58 East 68th Street (corner of Park Avenue)
- Park Avenue Houses
  - Percy R. Pyne House, 680 Park Avenue (now the Americas Society)
  - Oliver D. Filley House, 684 Park Avenue (now the Queen Sofía Spanish Institute)
  - William Sloane House, 686 Park Avenue (now the Italian Cultural Institute of New York)
  - Henry P. Davison House, 690 Park Avenue (now the Italian Consulate General)
- 720 Park Avenue
- Asia Society, 725 Park Avenue
- 740 Park Avenue
- 778 Park Avenue
- 970 Park Avenue
- Church of St. Ignatius Loyola, 980 Park Avenue
- 1000 Park Avenue
- Park Avenue Christian Church, 1010 Park Avenue
- Brick Presbyterian Church, 1140 Park Avenue

== Transportation ==
=== Rail transit ===
Metro-North Railroad's Grand Central Terminal, serving the Harlem Line, Hudson Line, and New Haven Line, is at 42nd Street and Park Avenue. The MNR's Park Avenue main line runs along Park Avenue in both boroughs between Grand Central and Fordham station, with stations in between at 125th Street, 162nd Street, and Tremont Avenue.

The New York City Subway's adjacent Grand Central–42nd Street station serves the 4, 5, 6, <6>, 7, <7>, and S trains. The IRT Lexington Avenue Line additionally runs under Park Avenue and its extensions from 41st to 8th Streets. The 33rd Street, 28th Street, 23rd Street–Baruch College, and Astor Place stations are served by the 6 and <6> trains, while the 14th Street-Union Square station is served by the 4, 5, 6, <6>, L, N, Q, R, and W trains.

=== Bus service ===
The following bus routes serve Park Avenue:

- The downtown M98 Limited runs southbound on Park Avenue between the Harlem River Drive and 120th Street.
- The uptown M1, M2, and M3 run on the entirety of present-day 4th Avenue and Union Square East, plus Park Avenue South south of 25th Street.
- The southbound SIM1, SIM3, SIM4, SIM33, X27 and X28 express bus routes serve Park Avenue during off-peak hours.

No buses run along Park Avenue in the Bronx, although Fordham Plaza Bus Terminal is located at the northern end of the road.

== In popular culture ==
- The song "Puttin' On the Ritz", from the film Blue Skies (1946), refers to affluent people strutting "up and down Park Avenue".
- The 1961 stage and film musical How to Succeed in Business Without Really Trying takes place in the fictional "Park Avenue office building of World Wide Wicket Company, Inc."
- The 1936 film Theodora Goes Wild, the bachelor apartment of Michael Grant is located on Park Avenue.
- In the intro to the mid 1960s – early 1970s TV show Green Acres, Eva Gabor's character sings "Darling I love you, but give me Park Avenue!", where she lived before moving to rural Hooterville with her husband, the lawyer-turned-farmer.
- In the TV series The Odd Couple, Felix Unger and Oscar Madison live at 1049 Park Avenue.
- In the 1971 film Carnal Knowledge, the characters of Jack Nicholson and Art Garfunkel can be seen walking up Park Avenue, past the crossing with East 52nd Street.
- The 1972 debut solo album from Lou Reed features a cover painting, by artist Tom Adams, looking north along Park Avenue from the crossing with East 53 Street. Visible in the background is the Lever House at 390 Park Avenue.
- In the TV series Diff'rent Strokes, Phillip Drummond, with his daughter, Kimberly and adopted sons, Willis and Arnold Jackson live at 697 Park Avenue.
- In the 1987 novel The Bonfire of the Vanities, WASP bond trader Sherman McCoy lives in an apartment on Park Avenue, signifying his financial success.
- In the multi-platinum 1989 hit single "Youth Gone Wild" by American band Skid Row, Park Avenue is mentioned in the lyrics: "I said 'Hey man, there's something that you oughta know. / I tell ya Park Avenue leads to Skid Row.'"
- In The Simpsons episode "E-I-E-I-D'oh", Homer is ridiculed by two farmers outside Sneed's Feed & Seed (Formerly Chuck's) for having a "Park Avenue manicure". Homer responds by saying "I'm sorry, I believe in good grooming".
- The PBS documentary Park Avenue: Money, Power and the American Dream sheds light on the gap between the impoverished people living on Park Avenue in the South Bronx and the extremely wealthy living at 740 Park Avenue in Manhattan.
- General Motors borrowed the name of the street for the Buick Park Avenue, a large luxury sedan that was produced first as the premium trim line for the Buick Electra from 1977 to 1990, and as a standalone model from 1991 to 2005.
- In the 2017 video game Sonic Forces, one of the main stage takes place on Park Avenue, the stage re-imagined as a war zone.
- In the second season of Riverdale, one of the main characters from the show, Veronica Lodge is said to have lived on Park Avenue when she was back in New York City.
- In an episode in the second season of Seinfeld, "The Chinese Restaurant", one character that cuts in front of the main characters Jerry, Elaine, and George at a restaurant in Manhattan is said to live there, implying that he is incredibly wealthy and deserving of the special treatment.
- In the sixth season of Mad Men, Don Draper's address appears on an envelope as "783 Park Avenue, apt. 17B".
- In the 2012 film The Avengers, the climax takes place on the Park Avenue Viaduct.

== Gallery ==
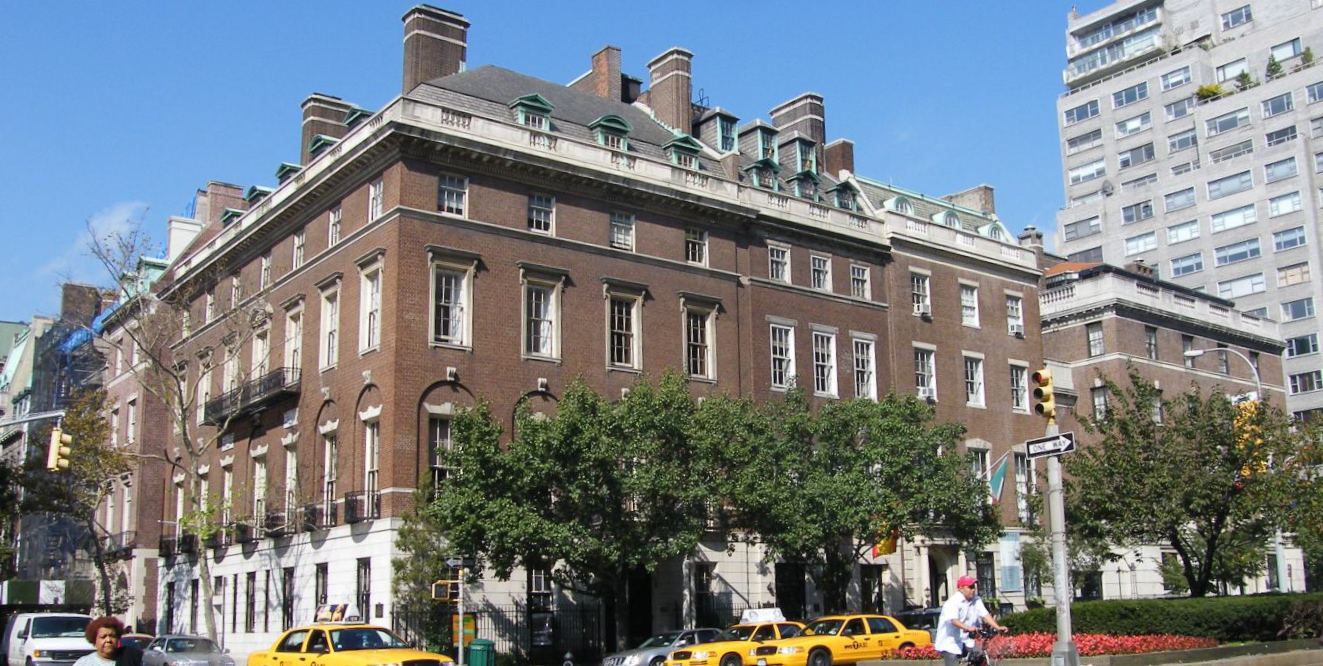
Henry P. Davison House, Percy Rivington Pyne House, Oliver D. Filley House and William Sloane House is one of the original house ensembles left on Park Avenue.

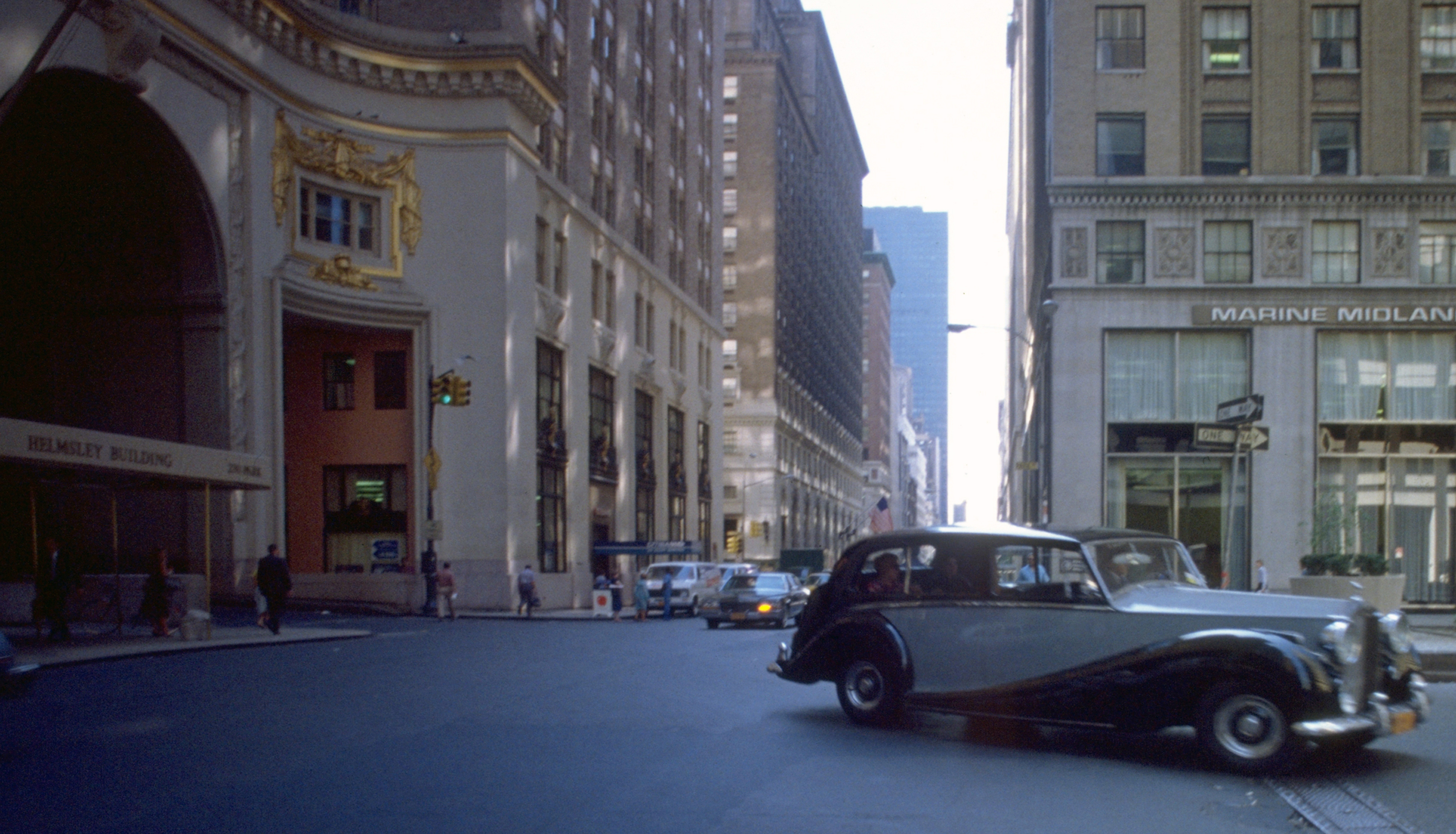
Park Avenue and 47th Street, adjacent to the Helmsley Building
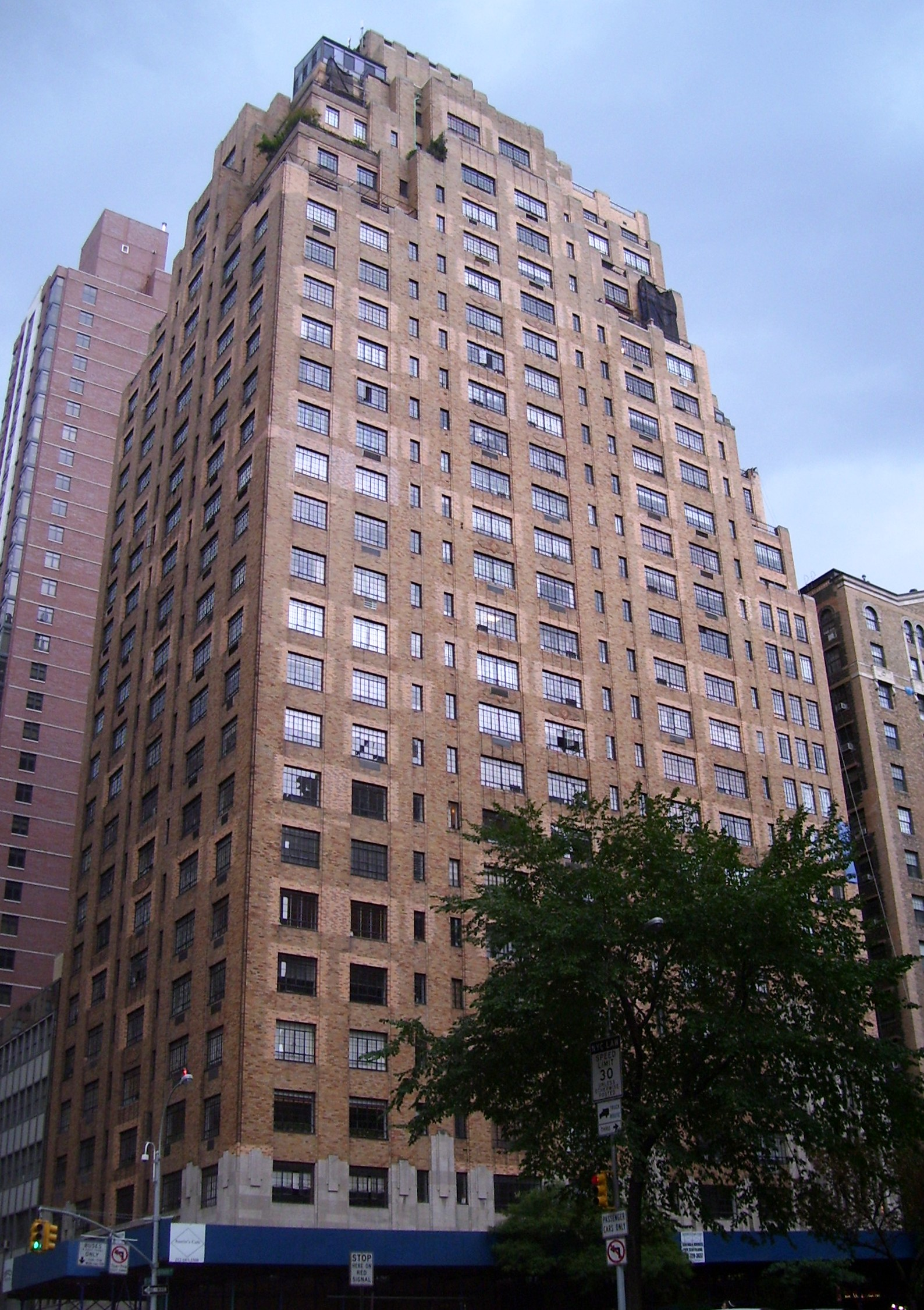
10 Park Avenue, at the corner of East 34th Street

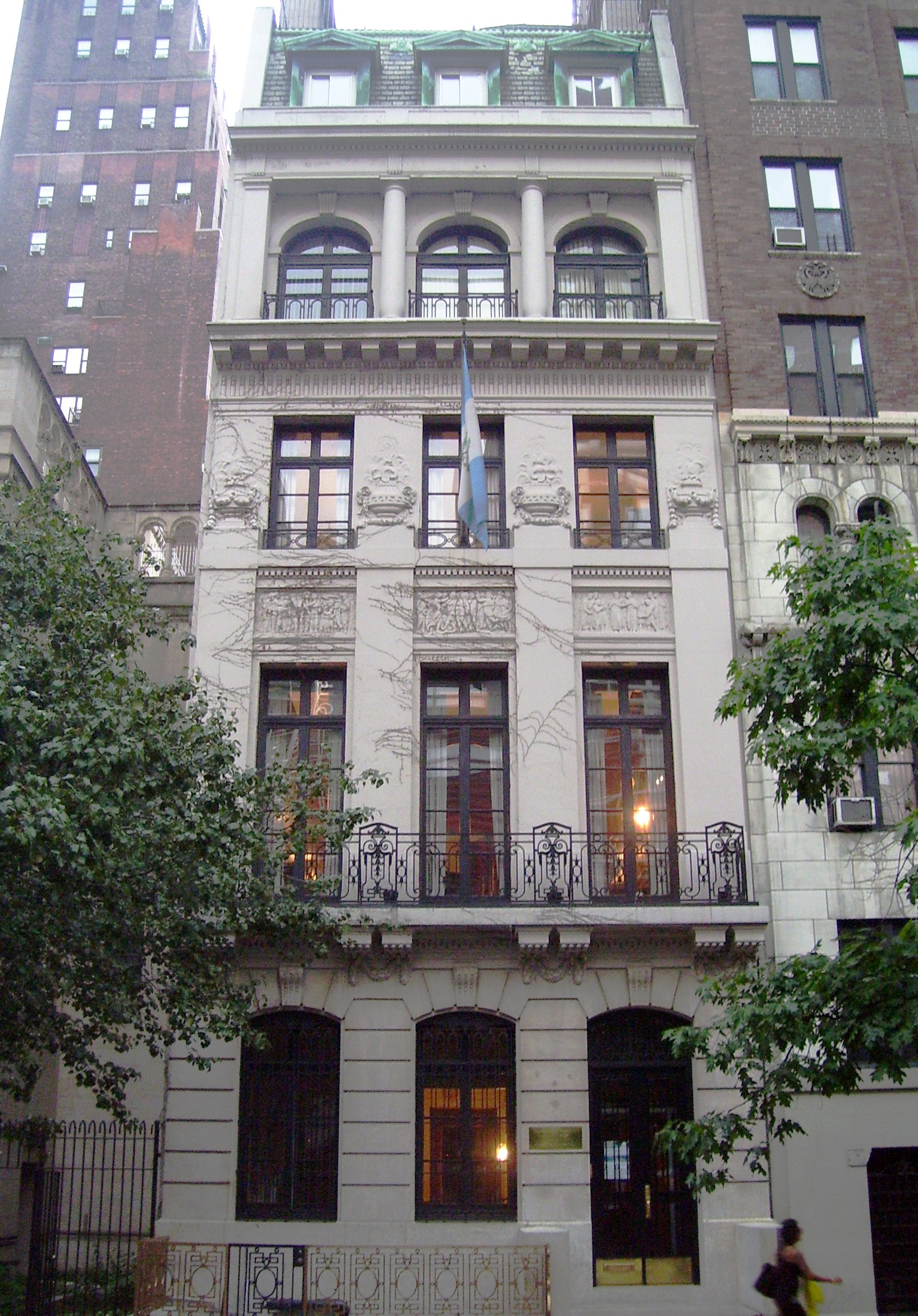
The Adelaide L. Townsend Douglas House, currently the Guatemalan U.N. Mission at 57 Park Avenue, between East 37th and 38th Streets

== See also ==
- List of most expensive streets by city
