= Park Avenue Houses =

Historic houses in Manhattan, New York

- U.S. National Register of Historic Places
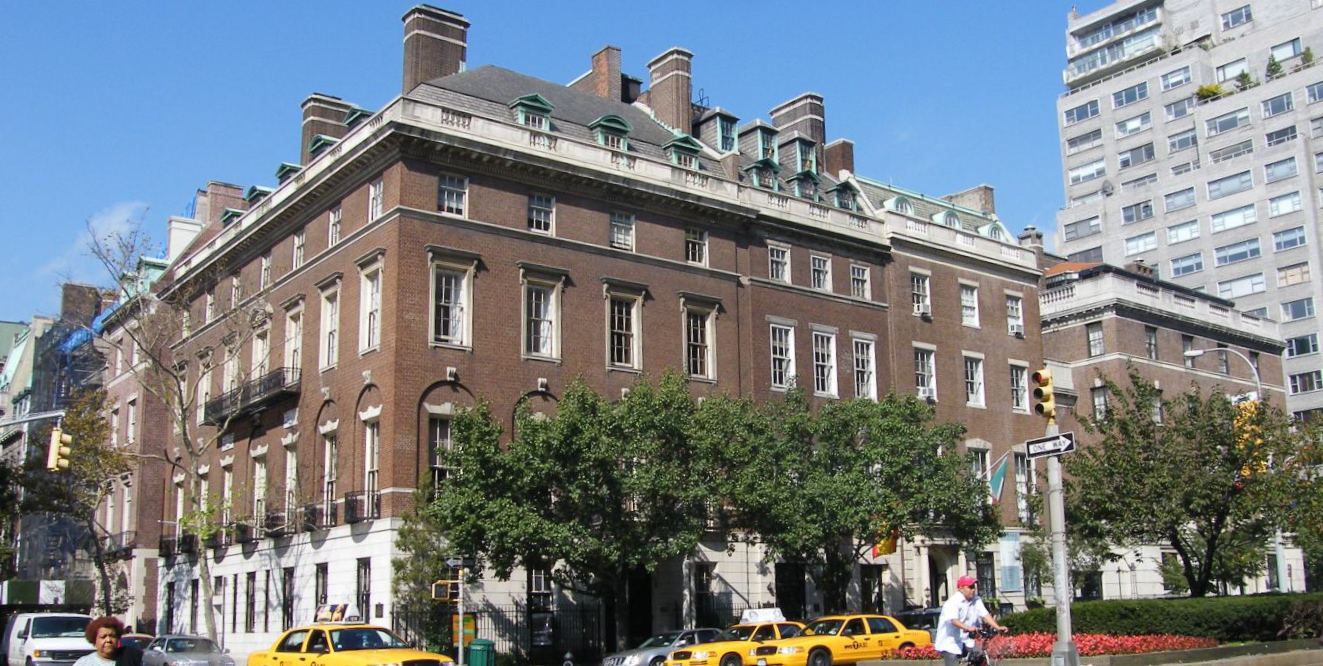
- Park Avenue Houses in 2008

- Location within New York City Location within New York Location within the United States
- Location: 680, 684, 686 and 690 Park Avenue, New York, New York
- Coordinates: 40°46′8″N 73°57′57″W
- Built: 1909
- Architect: McKim, Mead & White
- Architectural style: Late 19th and 20th Century Revivals, Neo-Federal
- NRHP reference No.: 80002708
- Added to NRHP: January 3, 1980

The Park Avenue Houses in New York City were built in 1909. They were added to the National Register of Historic Places in 1980.

The Park Avenue Houses are listed together on the National Register of Historic Places and individually on the New York City Landmark Preservation Commission registry. They are

- 680 Park Avenue - Percy R. Pyne House (now the Americas Society)
- 684 Park Avenue - Oliver D. Filley House (now the Queen Sofía Spanish Institute)
- 686 Park Avenue - William Sloane House (now the Italian Cultural Institute of New York)
- 690 Park Avenue - Henry P. Davison House (now the Italian Consulate General)

== See also ==
- National Register of Historic Places listings in Manhattan from 59th to 110th Streets
- List of New York City Designated Landmarks in Manhattan from 59th to 110th Streets
