= William Sloane House =

- U.S. Historic district – Contributing property
- New York City Landmark
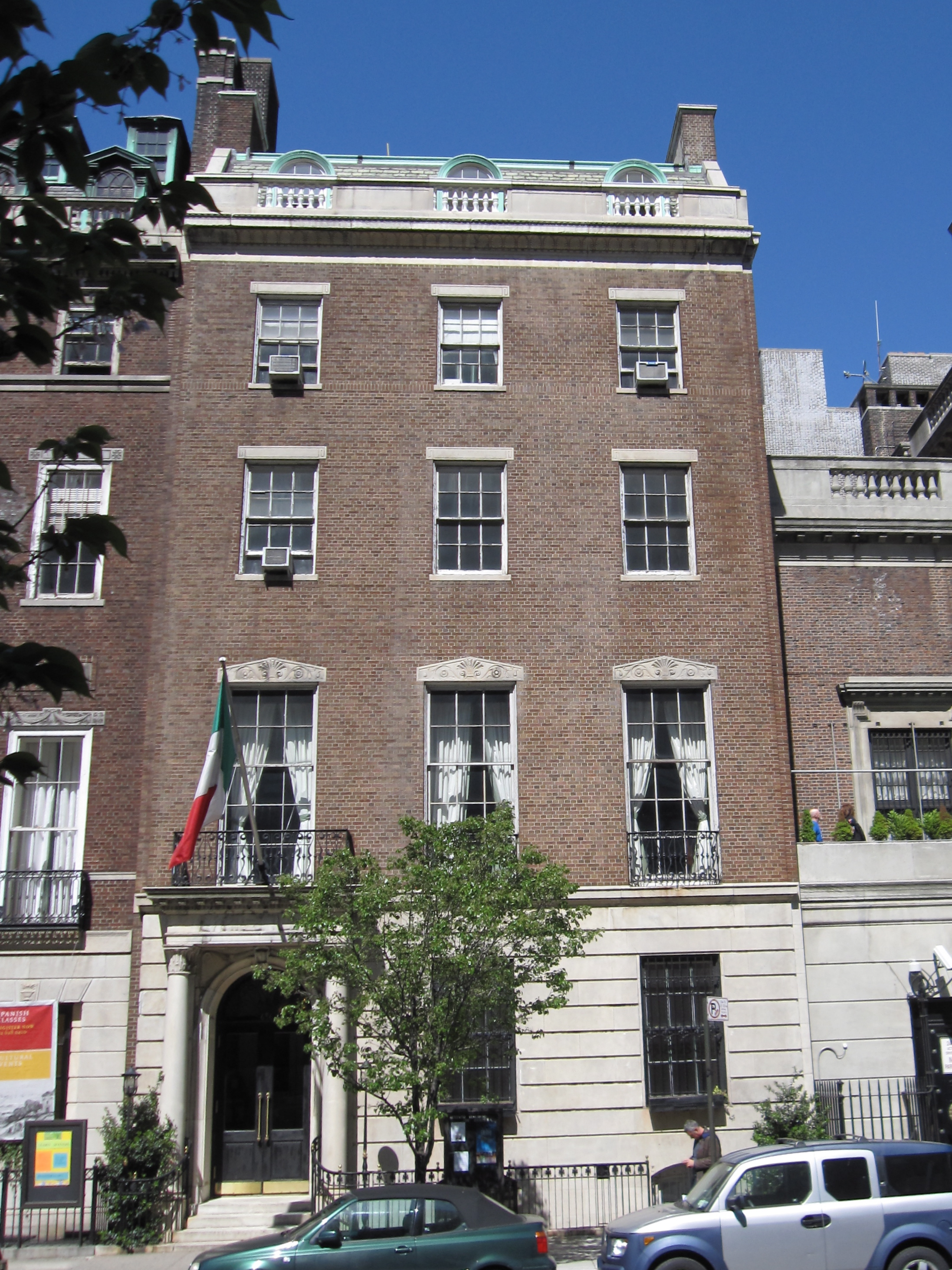
- William Sloane House on Park Avenue

- Location within New York City Location within New York Location within the United States
- Location: 686 Park Ave, New York, New York
- Coordinates: 40°46′8″N 73°57′57″W
- Built: 1916-1919
- Architect: Delano & Aldrich
- Architectural style: Neo-Federal
- Part of: Park Avenue Houses (ID80002708)
- NYCL No.: 706

Significant dates
- Designated CP: January 3, 1980
- Designated NYCL: November 10, 1970

The William Sloane House (also known as the William and Frances Crocker Sloane House) is a mansion located on 686 Park Avenue between 68th and 69th Streets on the Upper East Side of Manhattan in New York City.

It was constructed for the industrialist William Sloane and his wife Frances Crocker Sloane in 1919 by Delano & Aldrich in the Colonial Revival style as one of the Park Avenue Houses.

The building, with the adjacent 690 Park Avenue, is currently owned by the Republic of Italy and home to the Italian Cultural Institute.

The House became a New York City designated landmark in 1970 and is listed on the National Register of Historic Places as part of the Park Avenue Houses.
