= Oliver D. Filley House =

- U.S. Historic district – Contributing property
- New York City Landmark
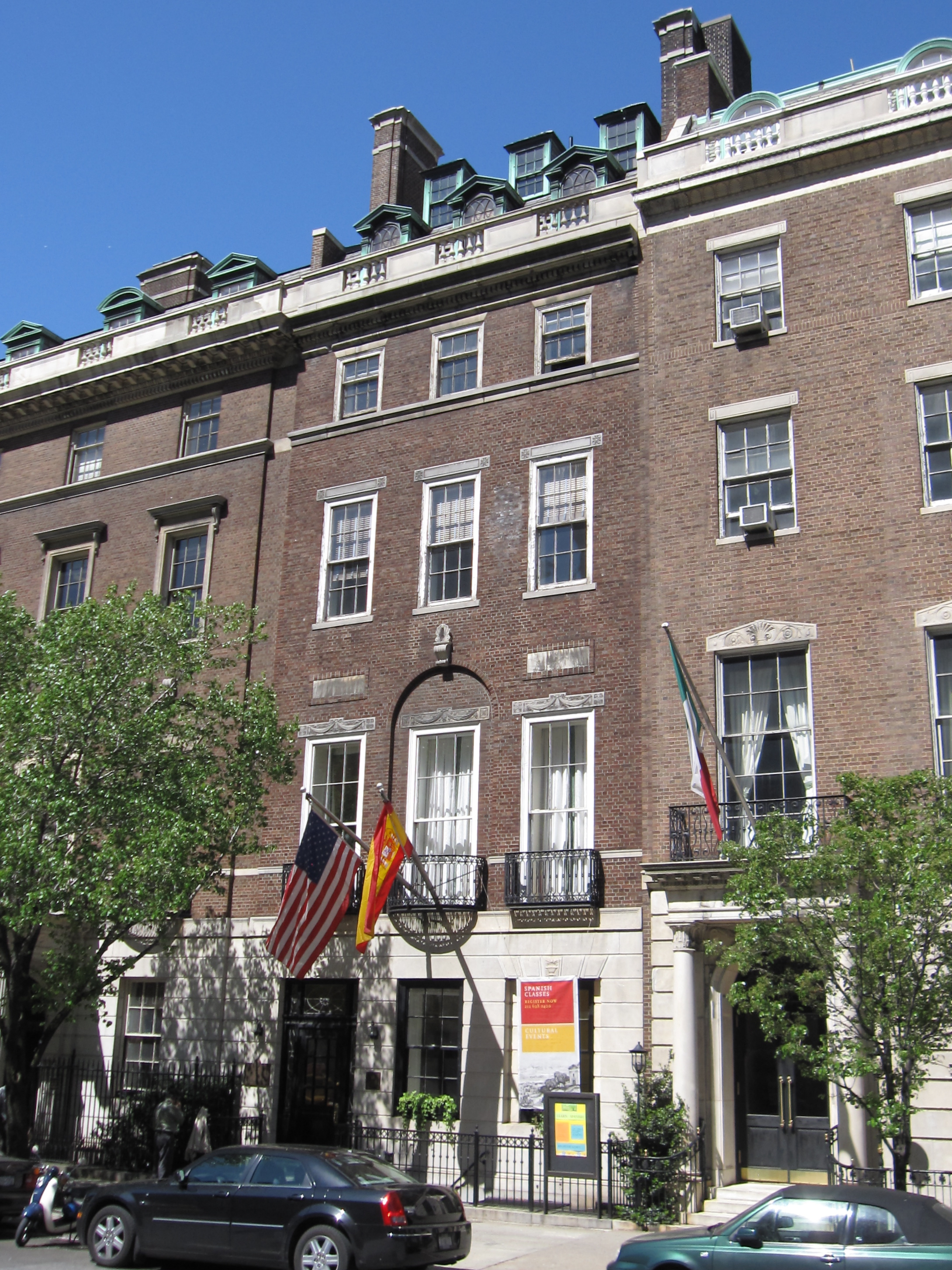
- Oliver D. Filley House on Park Avenue

- Location within New York City Location within New York Location within the United States
- Location: 684 Park Ave, New York, New York
- Coordinates: 40°46′8″N 73°57′57″W
- Built: 1925-1926
- Architect: McKim, Mead & White
- Architectural style: Neo-Federal
- Part of: Park Avenue Houses (ID80002708)
- NYCL No.: 705

Significant dates
- Designated CP: January 3, 1980
- Designated NYCL: November 10, 1970

The Oliver D. Filley House is a mansion located on 684 Park Avenue between East 68th and 69th Streets on the Upper East Side of Manhattan, New York City.

== History ==
It was constructed for Mary Pyne Filley and her husband Oliver D. Filley in 1926, financed by her parents. The architects were McKim, Mead & White, who used the same neo-Federal style that was shown in the firm's adjoining Percy Rivington Pyne House on the corner of 68th Street. The generous action of the Margaret Rockefeller Strong de Larraín, Marquesa de Cuevas in acquiring the property in 1965 and presenting it to the Queen Sofía Spanish Institute, saved the building and assured its architectural integrity.

The Designated Landmark of New York City plaque was provided by The New York Community Trust in 1972.
