= European Assisted Conception Consortium =

European scientific organization

The European Assisted Conception Consortium (EACC) is an organization whose aim is to bring together national ART regulators and practitioners within the European Union for professional cooperation and joint action.

Its inaugural meeting was in Copenhagen in 2005, under the chairmanship of Angela McNab.

== See also ==
- European Society of Human Reproduction and Embryology
