= Council of the Americas =

American free trade promotion organization

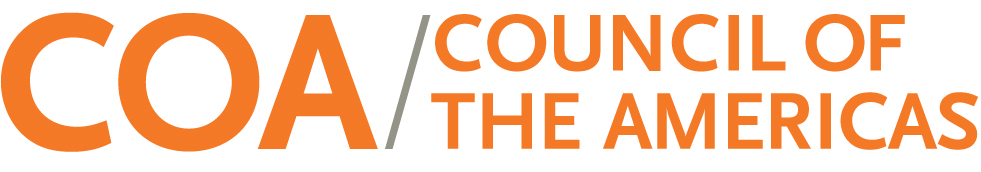
- Formation: 1963
- Headquarters: 680 Park Avenue; New York, NY 10021 United States
- Location: New York City
- Coordinates: 40.768830°N 73.965975°W
- CEO: Susan L. Segal
- Website: www.as-coa.org

Council of the Americas is an American organization whose stated goal is promoting free trade and open markets throughout the Americas.

== History ==
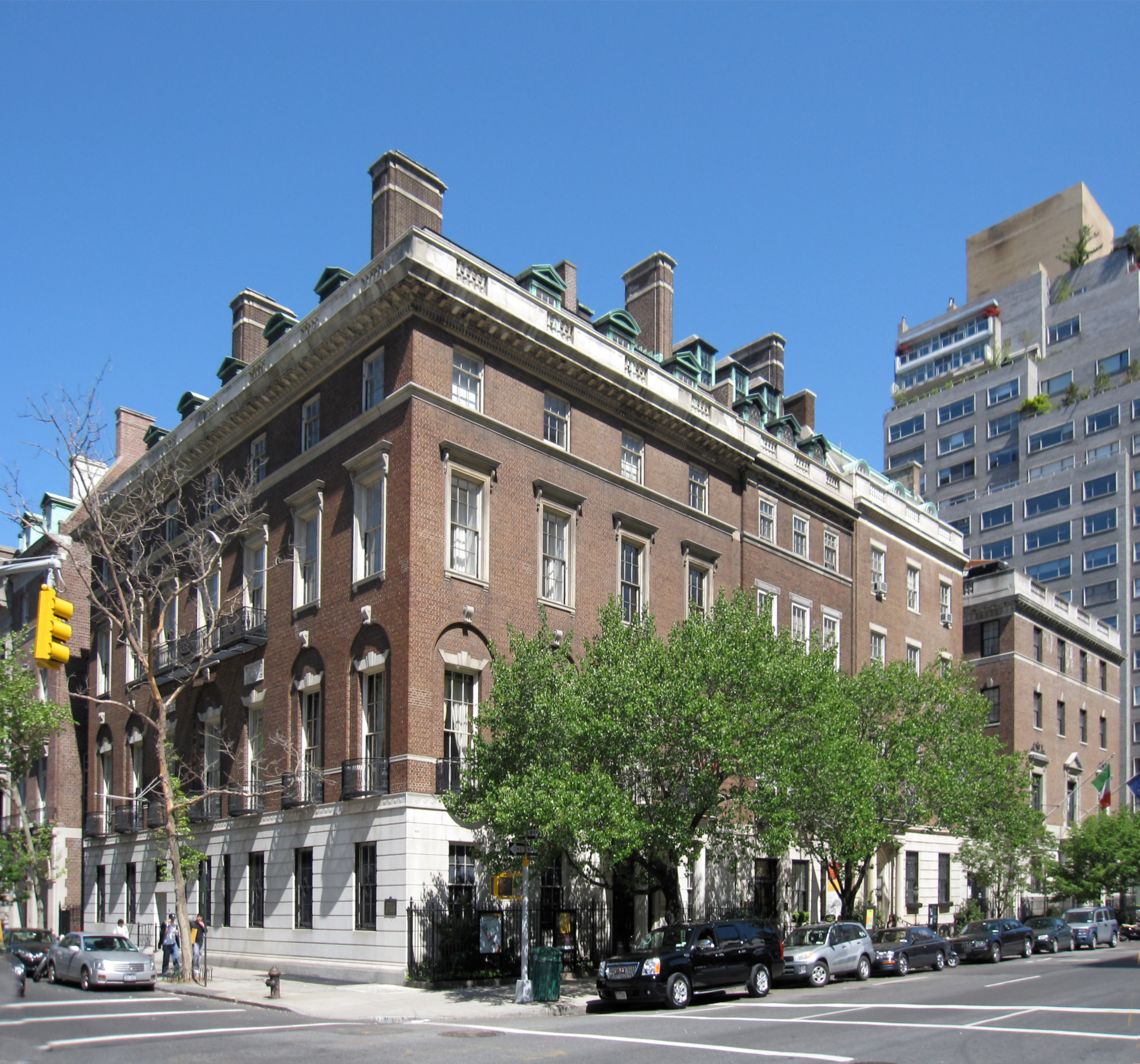
Headquarters at the Percy R. Pyne House.

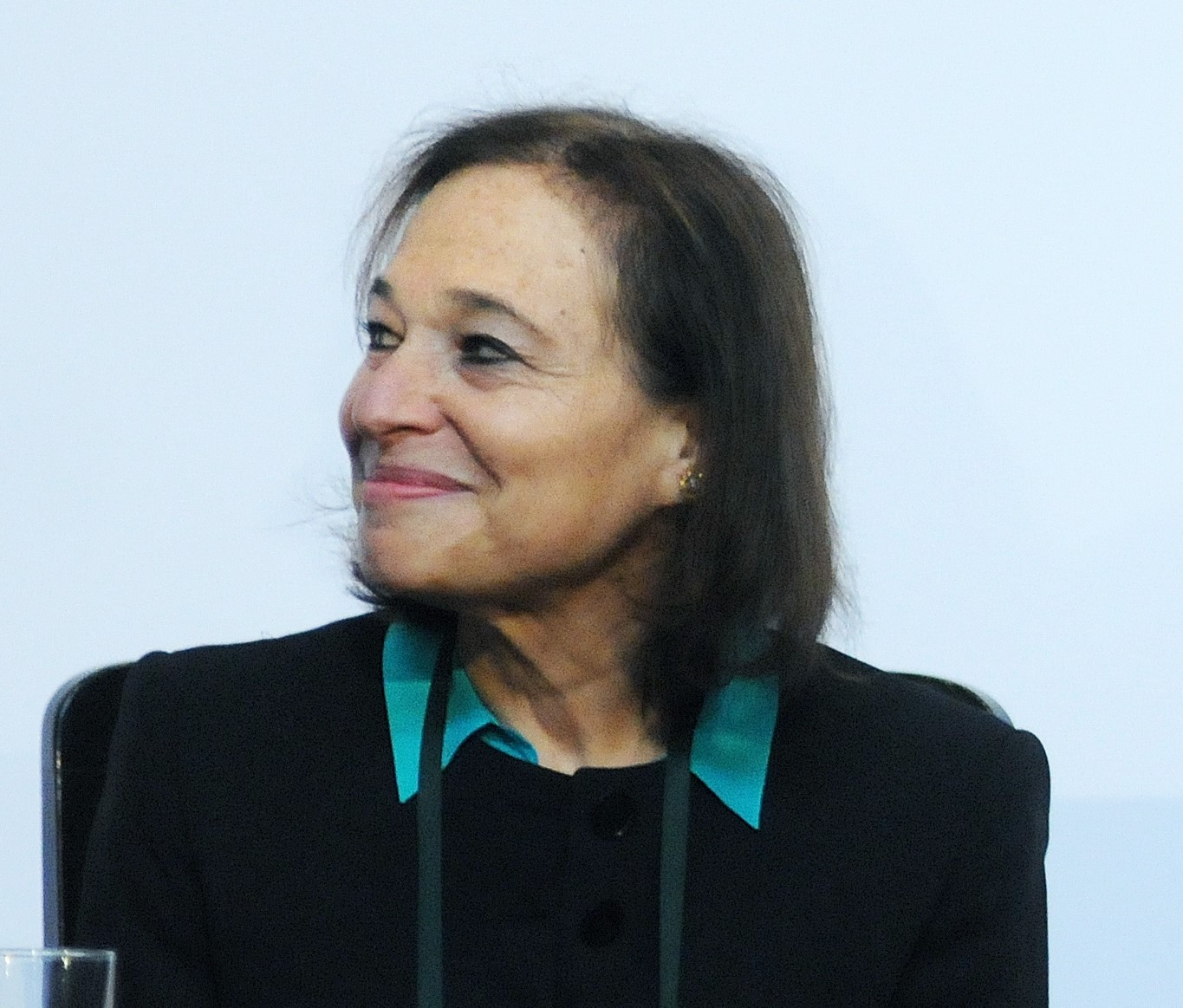
Susan Louise Segal - CEO

The group was founded in 1963 as the Business Group for Latin America by David Rockefeller, at the request of President John F. Kennedy as a means for business to fight the influence of Fidel Castro in Latin America. The Kennedy administration conceded investment guarantees, which by 1967 would cost the government $600 million in the case of Chile alone. Almost 30 corporations participated by 1965, when the Business Group was reorganized as the Council for Latin America.

== See also ==
- North American Free Trade Agreement (NAFTA)
- Free Trade Area of the Americas
