= Percy R. Pyne House =

- U.S. Historic district – Contributing property
- New York City Landmark
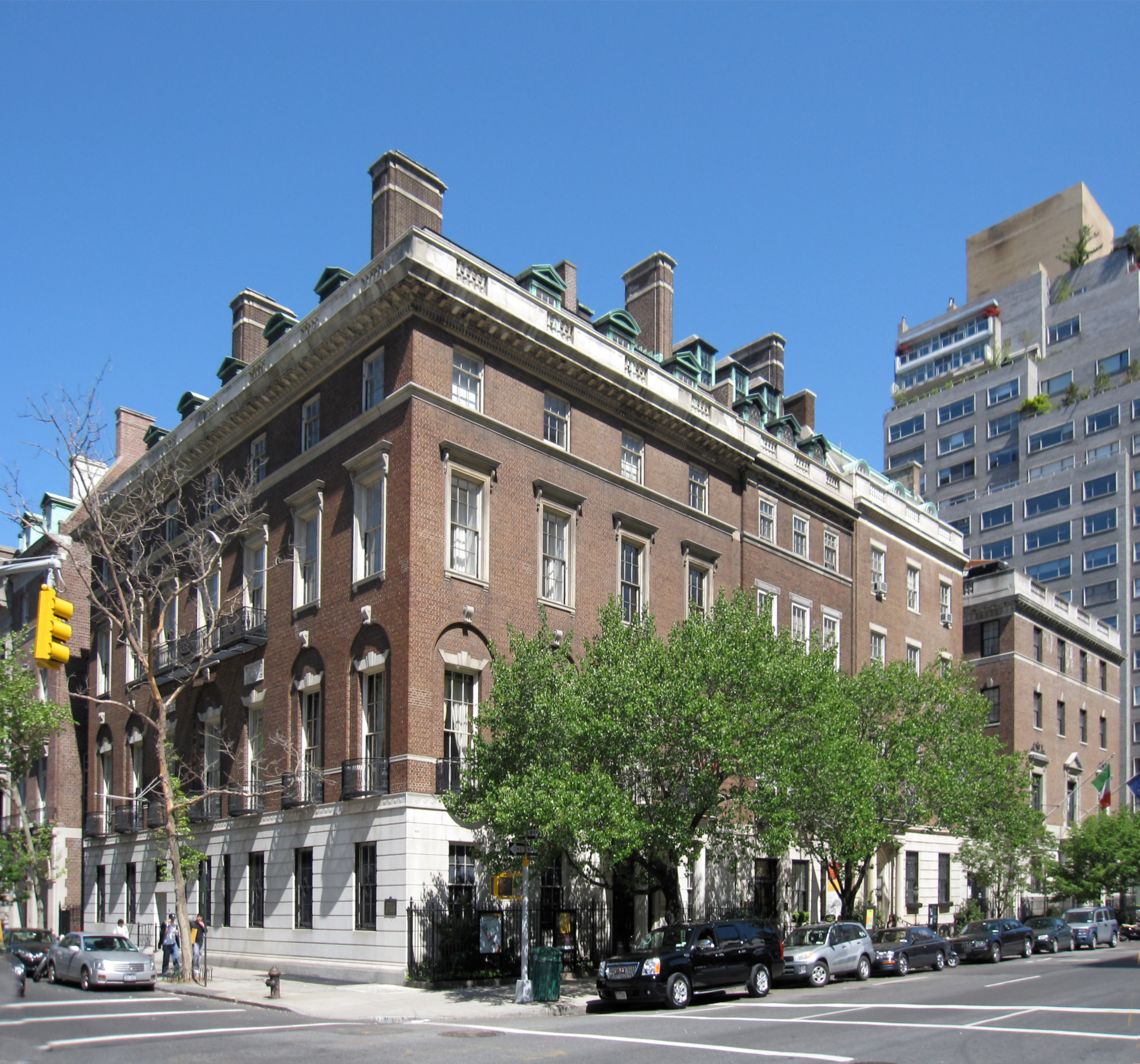
- Percy R. Pyne House on Park Avenue

- Location within New York City Location within New York Location within the United States
- Location: 680 Park Ave, New York, New York
- Coordinates: 40°46′5″N 73°57′54″W
- Area: 21,869 sq ft (2,031.7 m^{2})
- Built: 1909-1911
- Architect: McKim, Mead & White
- Architectural style: Neo-Federal
- Part of: Park Avenue Houses (ID80002708)
- NYCL No.: 704

Significant dates
- Designated CP: January 3, 1980
- Designated NYCL: November 10, 1970

The Percy R. Pyne House (also known as the Percy Rivington Pyne House and Percy & Maud H. Pyne House) is a neo-Federal townhouse at 680 Park Avenue, located at the northwest corner of Park Avenue and 68th Street in Manhattan.

Currently, the Americas Society uses the building as its New York City headquarters.

== History ==
Designed by McKim, Mead & White for Percy Rivington Pyne II, grandson of the noted financier Moses Taylor, it was built from 1909 to 1911.

Its materials and scale established a character that was followed by the architects of all the subsequent houses on this Park Avenue blockfront. The building was occupied by the Soviet Mission to the United Nations from 1948 to 1964. The generous actions of the Margaret Rockefeller Strong de Larraín, Marquesa de Cuevas, in acquiring the property in 1965 and presenting it to the Americas Society, saved the building from destruction.

Together with the buildings of the neighboring Oliver D. Filley House (now the Queen Sofía Spanish Institute) at 684 Park Avenue and the Henry P. Davison House (now the Italian Consulate General) at 690 Park Avenue, it forms one of the last intact architectural ensembles on Park Avenue.

The building was designated as a New York City landmark by the New York City Landmark Preservation Commission on November 10, 1970. A landmark plaque was provided by The New York Community Trust in 1971.
