= LatinFinance =

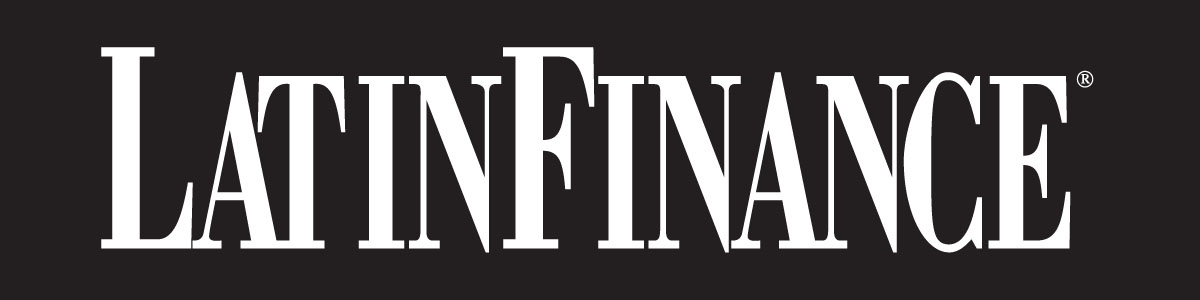
- Type: Private
- Industry: Financial Media/Information
- Founded: 1988
- Headquarters: New York & Miami with correspondents in São Paulo, Mexico City, Bogotá, Lima, Buenos Aires, Beijing
- Key people: Taimur Ahmad (CEO); Giuliana Moreyra (COO); John Meehan (Managing Editor)
- Website: www.latinfinance.com

LatinFinance (written as single word, with an upper-case L and F) is a source of intelligence on the financial markets and economies of Latin America and the Caribbean.

Launched in 1988 and published from New York and Miami, with a network of correspondents across Latin America and the Caribbean, LatinFinance also serves the capital markets of the region through its daily subscription service, the Daily Brief, which provides proprietary news and data on deals, from rumor to close.

LatinFinance also runs a high-level series of networking events designed to bring companies and governments from Latin America and the Caribbean together with international investors both at forums across the Americas and also at capital introduction events in Europe (London, Madrid, Zurich), Asia (Beijing, Shanghai, Hong Kong, Mumbai, Seoul) and the Middle East (Abu Dhabi, Dubai).

== History ==
The magazine LatinFinance was first published in October 1988. Its initial editorial objective was, in large part, to explore and document the changes and opportunities in Latin America brought about as a result of the Latin American debt crisis, sovereign defaults and subsequent Brady Plan of the late 1980s. During this period LatinFinance was primarily focused on debt, covering banks' attempts to reduce their exposure to LDC debt, sovereigns' efforts to restructure their debt and raise fresh capital through amongst other things privatization, and the secondary markets activity that grew from this.

LatinFinance's September 2008 cover by Oliver Weiss

The editorial focus, and readership, of the magazine expanded rapidly to encompass debt, equity, forex and emerging financial products including derivatives and structured finance products and to examine the practical application of these products by sovereign, sub-sovereign, financial and corporate issuers as well as their role in areas such as infrastructure and project finance, M&A, and financial risk management. Over time travel, wine and art were added to the magazine's coverage and by the mid-1990s it was being described by The New York Times as the "glossy magazine that fills the coffee-table niche" among titles covering business in Latin America. For a while LatinFinance even carried a regular, if short-lived, Japanese-language section.

Though the company organized several events, and published some books, through the end of the 1990s LatinFinance's business was predominantly magazine publishing with both revenues and profits derived primarily from advertising sales and magazine subscriptions. The period following the 1998–2002 Argentine great depression and default in early 2002 proved especially challenging for Latin American financial markets and those active in them. LatinFinance's performance in its 2002 financial year slumped to the worst in its then 15-year history though it remained profitable and was even able to consider, though ultimately to reject, suggestions that it absorb the two other pan-regional business-to-business titles.

From 2003 LatinFinance embarked on a new strategy to diversify from its core magazine by accelerating the expansion of its events and seminars and to deepen and broaden its coverage through investment in and a realignment of editorial – notably replacing its entire editorial staff and moving editorial from Miami to either New York or into Latin America – thus enabling the launch of electronic news and data products. During this period LatinFinance refocused on its core finance and investment subjects ceasing, for example, publication of its longstanding, annual Corporate Travel Guide. Concurrently LatinFinance's editorial broadened into an explicit aim to "examine the drivers and direction of movements of capital into, out of and around Latin America and the Caribbean, as they happen, wherever those flows come from or from where-ever they are directed". Therefore, in addition to Latin America and the Caribbean, LatinFinance is now active in the major financial centers of North America and Europe as well as in newer centers for capital provision including China, Japan, Korea, the GCC and India.

LatinFinance 20th anniversary celebrations, Times Square, New York

LatinFinance has won numerous editorial awards and on its 20th anniversary in 2008 was honored by Nasdaq for its contribution to the evolution of the capital markets of Latin America and the Caribbean.

In September 2011 LatinFinance launched an equity index in association with Management & Excellence, the Madrid- and São Paulo-based consultancy.

In April 2017, LatinFinance's CEO, backed by a small group of investors, completed a management buyout of the business.

== Ownership and management ==
LatinFinance is the trade name of Latin American Financial Publications Inc., a wholly owned subsidiary of Latin American Financial Media LLC. LatinFinance management acquired the business in 2017 from Euromoney Institutional Investor, a UK-based FTSE-250 media company, and full owner of LatinFinance since 1998. The company was founded in 1987 by entrepreneur Peter Conway.

== Products ==
LatinFinance publishes the magazine LatinFinance and an early morning daily news alert, the LatinFinance Daily Brief. It runs a data intensive web-site, www.latinfinance.com – home to its League Tables and Deal Pipeline – and a series of networking events comprising discursive conferences and educational seminars.

- LatinFinance, the magazine, is issued six times each year. In addition to analytical features it runs a series of respected and widely reported polls and awards – including its annual Deals of the Year, Man of the Year, and The LatinFinance Banks of the Year – and several surveys most notably a respected series ranking the sustainability of the region's banks and companies in association with M&E, a Madrid and São Paulo based consultancy.
- LatinFinance Events include a number of geographically defined conferences and product- or market-defined educational seminars that take place in Latin America and the Caribbean, in the major financial centers of North America and Europe as well as in newer centers for capital provision including the GCC, India, China and the Asia-Pacific.
  President Uribe of Colombia at the LatinFinance Andean Investment Forum
- The LatinFinance Daily Brief was launched in 2007, initially as a free, round-up of macro and markets news, much from secondary sources. It rapidly evolved to favor primary reporting and to deliver short, distilled news items before the financial markets open in the Americas. It is primarily deal-focused and seeks to follow the narrative of a debt, equity, structured or M&A deal from substantiated rumor, through negotiation, structuring, pricing, close and into its secondary market performance. It also covers movements in ratings, capital in- and out-flows, and movements of senior and/or influential people. The Daily Brief has broken many news stories, some of major significance, and often leads with the details of evolving deals.
- League Tables comprise a series of regularly updated underwriting and advisory league tables for debt, equity and M&A, by size, number of deals and fees, tracking the performance of investment banks active in the region.
- The LatinFinance Deal Pipeline is a database of upcoming and recently closed Latin American and Caribbean debt, equity and M&A deals including size, date, pricing, tenor.

== Readership and circulation ==
LatinFinance readers include heads of state, finance ministers and heads of public credit, central bankers, regulators, heads of investment banks, CEOs and CFOs, leading portfolio managers, private equity and hedge fund investors, traders, analysts and lawyers.

Within Latin America and the Caribbean, LatinFinance magazine is circulated to sovereign, corporate and financial issuers, as well as to local institutional investors. In North America, Europe, the Middle East and Asia, the magazine is distributed primarily to investors including sovereign wealth funds, hedge funds and private equity funds.

The magazine has a BPA audited circulation and a readership of some 55,000. Several thousand additional copies are distributed at events including the World Bank and International Monetary Fund Annual Meetings, the Inter American Development Bank or IDB Annual Meeting and at the annual Felaban Assembly.

== External corporate relationships ==
=== The World Economic Forum ===
LatinFinance has advised the World Economic Forum on the Latin American capital markets and finance content of its meetings and chaired panels at the World Economic Forum on Latin America.
