= Americas Society =

Nonprofit organization in New York City

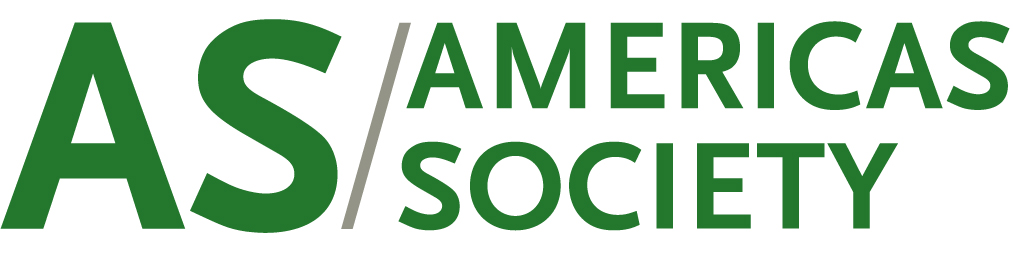
- Formation: 1965
- Headquarters: 680 Park Avenue; New York, NY 10021 United States
- Location: New York City
- Coordinates: 40.768830°N 73.965975°W
- Website: www.as-coa.org

The Americas Society is an organization dedicated to education, debate, and dialogue on the Americas. It is located at 680 Park Avenue on the Upper East Side of Manhattan, and was established by David Rockefeller in 1965.

The Americas Society promotes the understanding of the economic, political, and social issues confronting Latin America, the Caribbean, and Canada; its mission is "to increase public awareness and appreciation of the diverse cultural heritage of the Americas and the importance of the inter-American relationship."

== Building ==
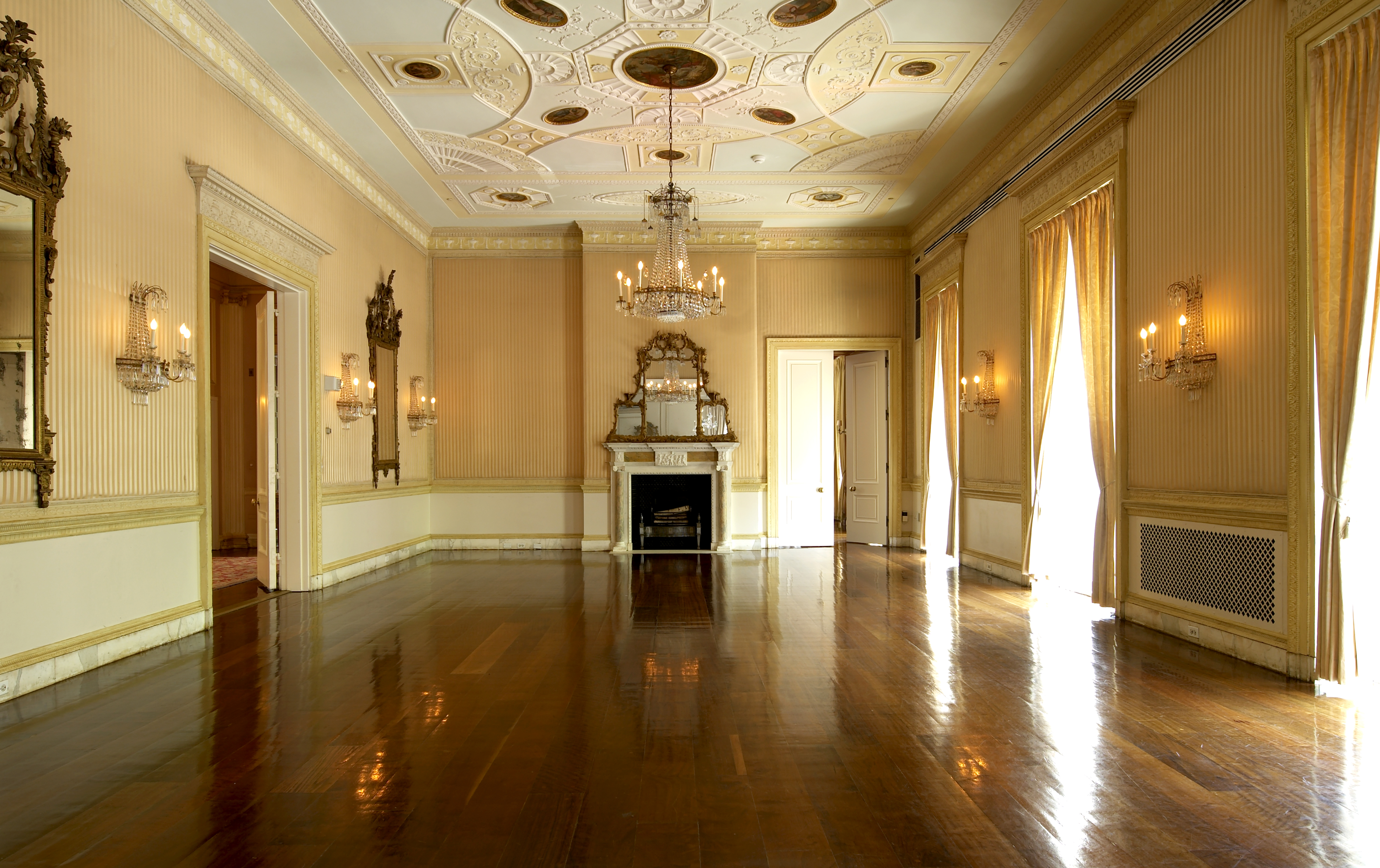
Salon Simón Bolivar

The Americas Society Building is listed in the National Register of Historic Places. The building was previously the Percy Rivington Pyne House before serving as the Soviet Mission to the United Nations until its current usage.

Along with the neighboring buildings of the Queen Sofía Spanish Institute and the Italian Consulate General, the house constitutes one of the few remaining unified architectural ensembles on Park Avenue. The Center for Inter-American Relations was later to be absorbed into Americas Society in 1985.

== Activities ==
The Americas Society organizes interviews, speeches, podcasts, exhibitions, readings, and musical performances at its headquarters and reports on Congressional updates, and local events. The Americas Society produces the MetLife Music of the Americas (concert series) to showcase the diversity of styles and genres of music in the Americas. The concert series is held at the Society's headquarters.

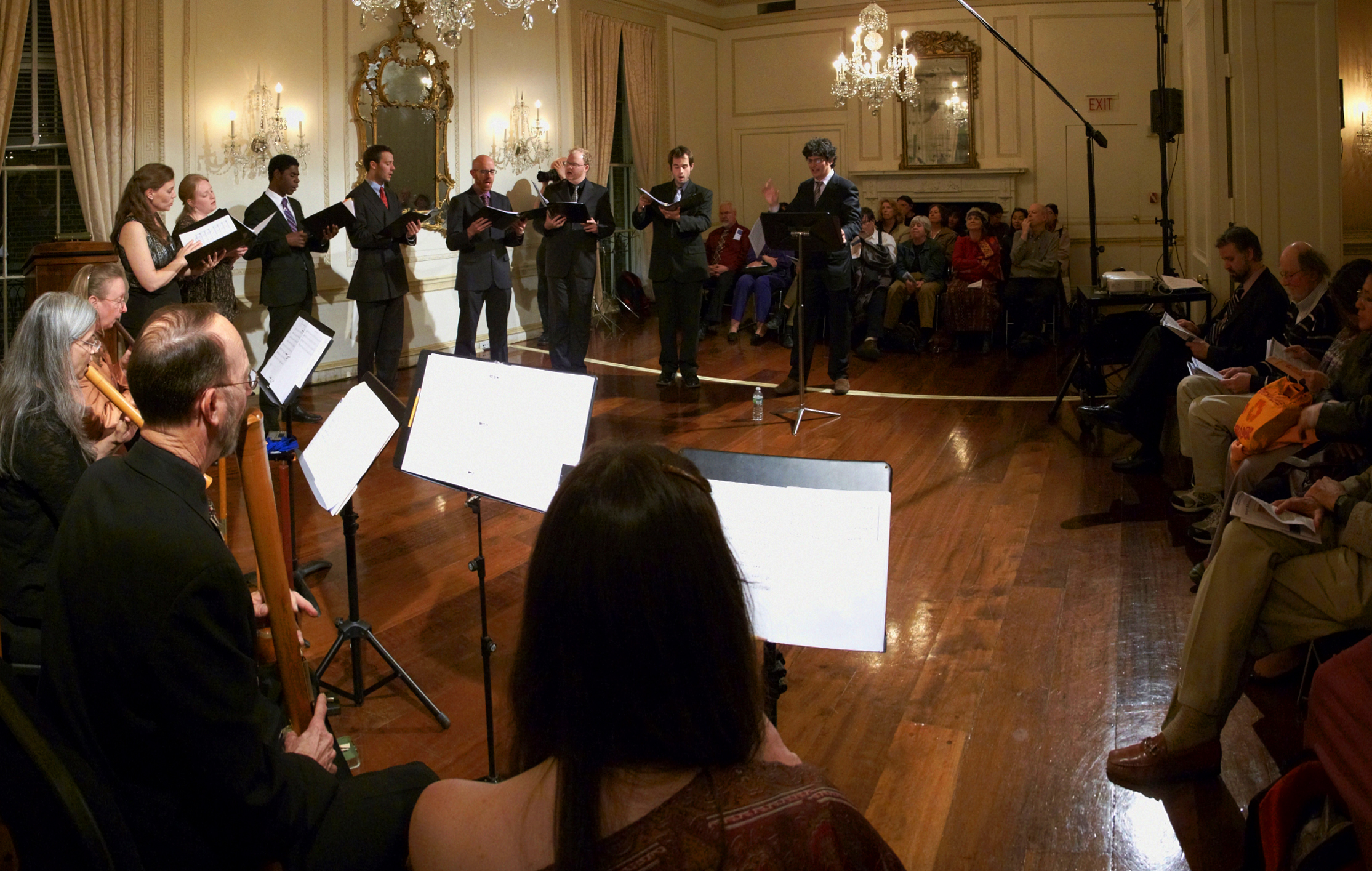
Meridionalis at Americas Society

The Americas Society, together with Council of the Americas, produces the publication Americas Quarterly, a policy journal for the Western Hemisphere. The Americas Society also published Review: Literature and Arts of the Americas founded in 1968. Review is an English-language journal for literature from Latin America, the Caribbean, and Canada. Review also helped support the first English translation of One Hundred Years of Solitude by Gabriel García Márquez as well as other translations.
