= European American Chamber of Commerce =

Non Profit Organisation

- Abbreviation: EACC
- Formation: 1926
- Type: 501(c)(6) nonprofit
- Purpose: To promote and stimulate transatlantic business development between Europe and the United States
- Members: 750

The European American Chamber of Commerce (EACC) is a private, independent, non-political, 501(c)(6) nonprofit organization whose objective is to promote and stimulate transatlantic business development between Europe and the United States. The EACC fosters economic development by providing its members with information, resources, and support on matters relating to business activities between Europe and the United States. There are currently eight chapters located in Europe and the United States.

== History ==
The European American Chamber of Commerce is a network of transatlantic business executives that began in 1926 with the formation of the Paris chapter. Initially as the French-American Chamber of Commerce, it became the European-American Chamber of Commerce in 2003. The first chapter in the United States was formed in Cincinnati, Ohio, in 2007 followed by the New York City chapter in 2008, the Princeton, New Jersey chapter in 2009 and the Lyon, France chapter in 2013, the Carolinas and Southwest France in 2016.The EACCNL, based in Amsterdam, in the Netherlands was founded in June 2019, EACC Florida, headquartered in Miami Florida, was founded in February 2020. The EACC Texas was founded in May 2021.

Select Milestones:
October 16, 2015: The New York Chapter of the European American Chamber of Commerce rings the EACC Closing Bell at the New York Stock Exchange.
October 28, 2024: The European American Chamber of Commerce New York (EACCNY) together with the European Investment Bank’s global financing arm, EIB Global, launched the Transatlantic Resilient Infrastructure Alliance TRIA, a joint initiative to support investments for resilient infrastructure in low- and middle-income countries in Africa, Latin America and Eastern Europe.

== Members ==
Members of the European American Chamber of Commerce include multinational organizations, small and medium enterprises and smaller organizations that are engaged in transatlantic trade and investment activities. The membership conditions and regulations vary according to regional chapters. The EACC global network represents over 650 members, more than 350 of which are in the US. Member companies vary in size and sector including industries such as financial services, legal services, media, real estate, consulting, luxury retail, tourism, advanced manufacturing in aerospace, automotive, packaging, life sciences, IT, consumer goods and more. In addition, consulates and trade and investment agencies of select European countries are also active members of the EACC network. Membership levels and benefits support the variety of EACC members' needs and organization sizes.

== Role and Purpose ==
The purpose of the European American Chamber of Commerce is to stimulate transatlantic trade and investments, to facilitate transatlantic business development, and to enhance relationships between European and American companies and professional organizations. The EACC is a business network that offers educational programs, networking opportunities and business connections leveraging the expertise and experience of its members. These are used to support market entry, trade development and investment in both Europe and the United States.

== European-American Press Club ==
The European American Press Club was created on April 11, 2002 as part of an initiative by members of the French American Chamber of Commerce in Paris. Formerly called the “French American Press Club," it was later renamed the “European American Press Club” in January 2004. The Press Club's primary goal is to connect journalists from Europe and the US with leading figures in politics and economics. This goal extends to include journalists from other parts of the world as well.
