= Queen Sofía Spanish Institute =

American nonprofit organization

Coordinates: 40°46′7.96″N 73°57′56.88″W

Queen Sofia Spanish Institute
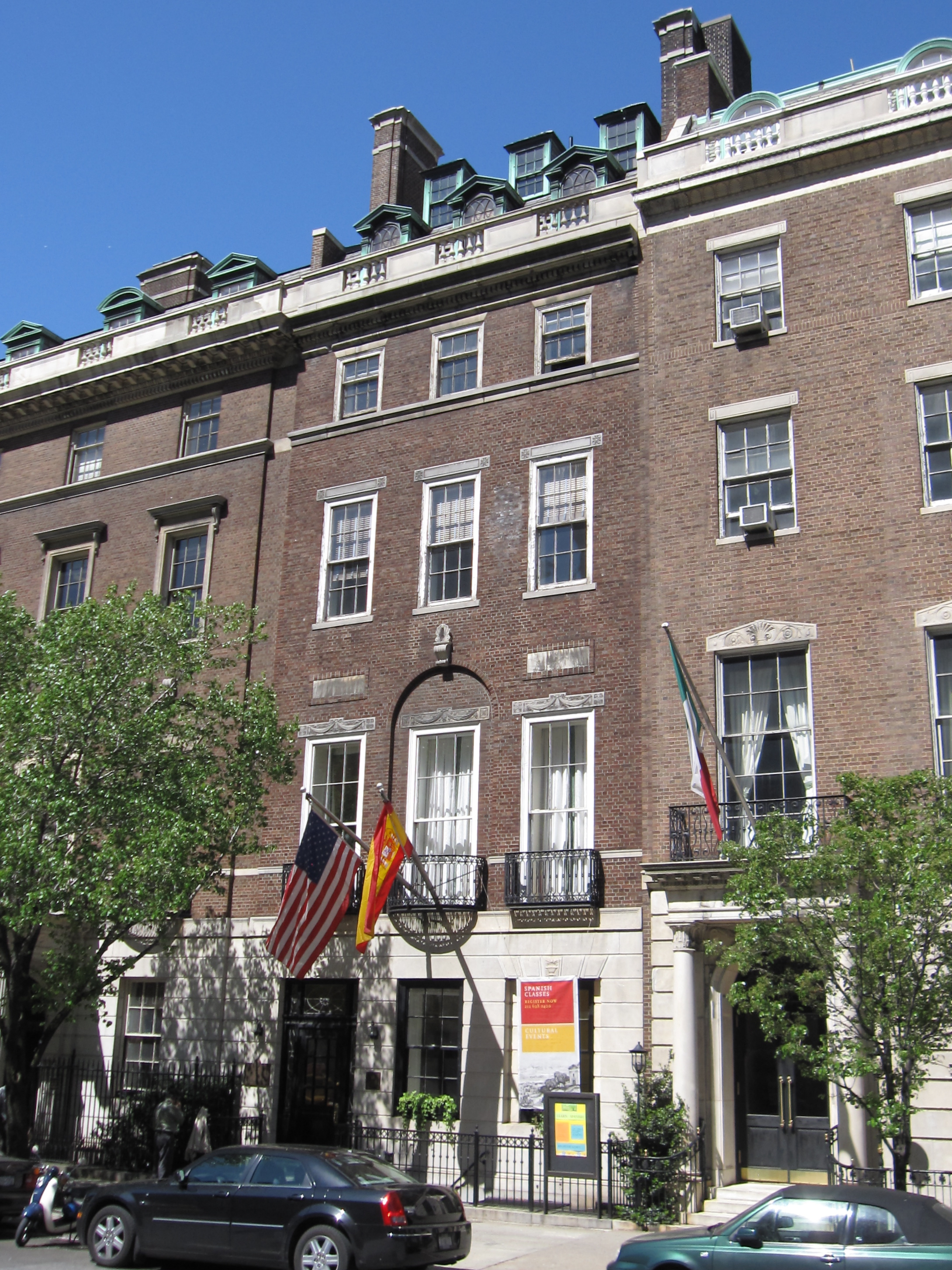
- Founded: 9 June 1954
- Type: Cultural institution
- Location: Offices at 575 Madison Avenue New York, NY 10022
- Product: Spanish cultural
- Endowment: Yes
- Employees: 3
- Website: queensofiaspanishinstitute.org

The Queen Sofía Spanish Institute is an organization in New York City, founded with the aim of promoting the culture of Spanish speaking countries and to foster their relations with the United States. It is located at the Oliver D. Filley House on the Upper East Side of Manhattan.

== History ==
On 18 May 1954, the institute was incorporated as a non-political, non-profit organization under the laws of the State of New York.

In 1965, the philanthropist Margaret Rockefeller Strong, saved the landmark building 684 Park Avenue from destruction. With her support and funding from McMicking Foundation, the institute made this building its headquarters.

The institute was renamed in 2003, to recognize Queen Sofía of Spain as its patroness.

In 2014, the building was sold. The institute cosponsors lectures, educational programs and other culturally relevant activities.

In 2018, the Institute formed a partnership with the Hispanic Society to provide a Maps and Globes educational program in New York City Public Schools of District 6. Other partners of the Institute include the Instituto Cervantes, Hunter College, Juilliard, the Spanish Consulate and the Americas Society.

In June 2025, the institute was awarded the President General's Medallion by the Daughters of the American Revolution. The medallion was presented to the institute's president and CEO, Begonia Santos, by President General Pamela Rouse Wright during the opening night ceremony of the 134th DAR Continental Congress at DAR Constitution Hall in Washington, D.C.

== Background ==
Queen Sofía Spanish Institute, Inc. (the "Institute") is a non-profit corporation founded in 1954 to stimulate American's interest in the Art, Culture, Customs, language, literature and history of the Spanish speaking world and to promote, among the Spanish-speaking peoples of the world; knowledge and understanding of ideals, culture and customs of the people of the United States, to the end that ties of friendship may be formed, mutual understanding promoted, and bonds of peace strengthened.

== Cultural events ==
The Institute holds a wide variety of artistic endeavors, including the co-sponsoring of exhibitions and lectures on important artistic movements, artistes and their works. Along with visual arts; the institute strives to support performance art as well, including concerts, performances, and lectures on the relevance of this art in today's society. The institute also holds gastronomy events in order to enrich American's knowledge of foods of the Spanish-speaking world and to bring people together.

The Institute holds a bi-annual translation prize to recognize translators who have successfully translated a work from Spanish to English and helped to make knowledge accessible including historical and educational lectures in order to enrich American's understanding and knowledge of the Spanish-Speaking World.

In September 2025, the Institute partnered with the Daughters of the American Revolution to host "Spain and the Birth of American Democracy: A History Symposium" at DAR Constitution Hall in Washington, D.C. The symposium was attended by Queen Sofía.

== Awards organized ==
=== Gala Gold Medalists ===
Beginning in 1978, The Queen Sofía Spanish Institute's Gold Medal was annually awarded to Americans and Hispanic people in recognition of their contributions to the betterment of relations between the United States and the Spanish Speaking World. This event brought together an array of international and American leaders and benefactors for a festive night of celebration. The Gala was a major source of funds for the activities of the institute.

In 2003, to mark the 50th Anniversary of the institute, the 50th Anniversary Commemorative Medal was awarded to His Majesty King Juan Carlos I and Her Majesty Queen Sofía of Spain.

The Institute no longer holds a Gold Medal Gala.

The recipients of the Gold Medal were:

- 1978 - Henry Ford II, Andrés Segovia
- 1979 - George S. Moore, Carlos Romero Barceló
- 1980 - Alicia de Larrocha, James A. Michener
- 1981 - Plácido Domingo, Margaret Rockefeller de Larraín
- 1982 - Ramón Castroviejo, John Davis Lodge, Severo Ochoa
- 1983 - Juan Antonio Samaranch, Roger B. Smith
- 1984 - Infante Juan, Count of Barcelona
- 1985 - Victoria de los Ángeles, John Brademas
- 1986 - Jaime de Piniés, Robert Goizueta
- 1987 - Infanta Pilar, Duchess of Badajoz and Luis Gómez-Acebo, Duke of Badajoz, Carroll and Milton Petrie
- 1988 - Angier Biddle Duke, Juan Luis Cebrián
- 1989 - María Amalia Lacroze de Fortabat, José Carreras
- 1990 - Javier Pérez de Cuéllar
- 1991 - D. Wayne Calloway, Javier Godó
- 1992 - Paloma O'Shea, Philippe de Montebello
- 1993 - Pasqual Maragall, Oscar de la Renta
- 1994 - Montserrat Caballé, Antonio Garrigues Diáz-Cañabate, Eric M. Javits
- 1995 - John McGillicuddy, Ignacio Gómez-Acebo
- 1996 - Martha T. Muse, John Richardson, Emilio de Ybarra y Churruca
- 1997 - John Elliott, Carolina Herrera
- 1998 - Valentín Fuster, Javier Solana, William C. Steere, Jr.
- 1999 - Charles A. Heimbold Jr., Robert Mosbacher, Mariano Puig
- 2000 - Felipe de Borbón Prince of Asturias
- 2001 - Plácido Arango, Rudy Giuliani, Dave H. and Reba White Williams
- 2002 - Evelyn Lauder, Jesús de Polanco, Leopoldo Rodés
- 2003 - Fernando Aleu
- 2004 - Richard Meier, Santiago Calatrava
- 2005 - Julio Iglesias, Henry Kissinger, Beatrice Santo Domingo
- 2006 - Michael Bloomberg, Mercedes Junco Calderón and (son) Eduardo Sánchez Junco, Mario Vargas Llosa
- 2007 - President Bill Clinton, Penélope Cruz
- 2008 - Cayetana Fitz-James Stuart, 18th Duchess of Alba, Mercedes T. Bass, José Esteve, José Fanjul
- 2009 - no medals awarded
- 2010 - Isak Andic, José Baselga, Diane von Fürstenberg, Joan Massagué, 2010 National Soccer Team of Spain
- 2011 - Ferran Adrià, Javier Bardem, Kenneth Chenault, Mario Testino
- 2012 - Norman Foster, Baron Foster of Thames Bank and Elena Ochoa, Lady Foster, Luis A. Ubiñas, Gonzalo Ulloa
- 2013 - Hillary Rodham Clinton, Antonio Banderas

=== Sophia Award for Excellence ===
The institute holds an annual ceremony to present the "Sophia Award for Excellence". This award pays tribute to a person or an organization that has actively contributed to the international appreciation of Spain and the Americas through a donation of time, expertise and wisdom in the areas of science, arts or the humanities.

The president and CEO is David Askren and the executive director, since September 2017 is Patrice Degnan Erquicia.

=== Translation Prize ===
With the aim of elevating awareness of Spanish literature in the United States, a triennial $10,000 prize was created by the Queen Sofía Spanish Institute to honor the best English-language translation of a work by a Spanish author. The inaugural award, celebrating the best translation published between 2006 and 2008, was given in 2010 to Edith Grossman for her 2008 translation of Antonio Muñoz Molina's A Manuscript of Ashes.

== See also ==
- Instituto Cervantes
