= Rowhouses at 322–344 East 69th Street =

- U.S. National Register of Historic Places
- U.S. Historic district
- New York State Register of Historic Places
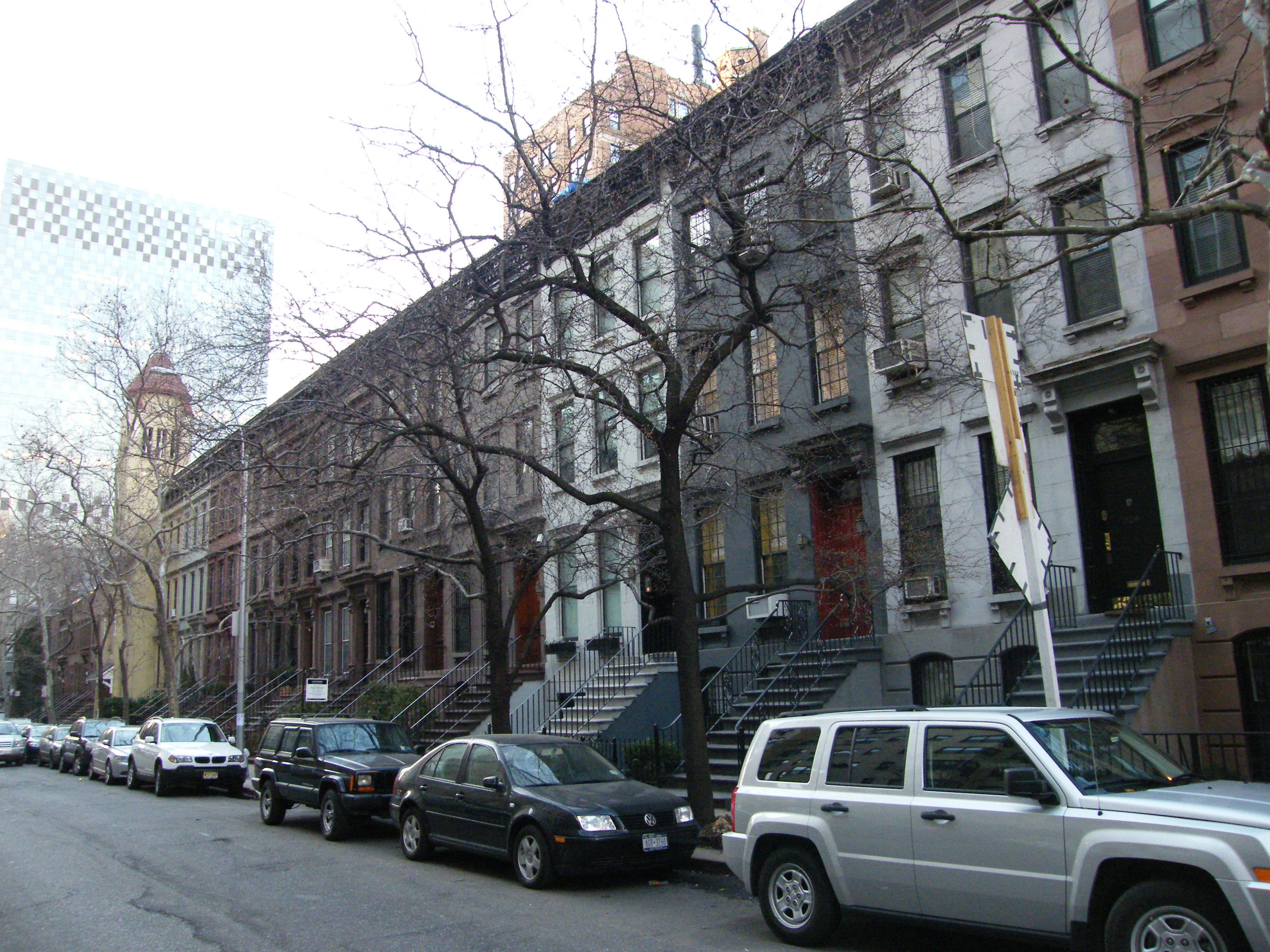
- North elevation of rowhouses, 2009

- Location within Manhattan Location within New York City Location within New York Location within the United States
- Location: Upper East Side, Manhattan, NY
- Coordinates: 40°45′58″N 73°57′31″W
- Built: 1879–80
- Architect: Jacob Valentine, William Smith
- Architectural style: Neo-Grec, Italianate
- NRHP reference No.: 84002793

Significant dates
- Added to NRHP: September 7, 1984
- Designated NYSRHP: July 25, 1984

The 12 rowhouses at 322–344 East 69th Street are located on the south side of that street between First and Second avenues on the Upper East Side of the New York City borough of Manhattan. They are Neo-Grec brownstone structures built around 1879, in two sets designed by different architects.

Together they constitute one of the few remaining areas of low-rise rowhouse development in a neighborhood where many such houses have been demolished in favor of high-rises. In 1984, they were recognized as a historic district and listed on the National Register of Historic Places.

== Buildings ==
The houses are three-story brownstones, some of which have been painted. Their raised rusticated basements all have segmental-arched windows and stoops leading to the main entrance. The stoops lead to double-doored main entrances flanked by narrow parlor windows. At the flat rooflines are galvanized iron cornices with dentils and angular brackets.

There are distinctions between the western six houses (Nos. 322–332) and the eastern six (334–344), built after the first two, primarily in the door and window enframements. The main entrances of the former group have slab lintels on stylized brackets with the flanking windows having simple lip lintels and sills on corbels similar to the entrance brackets. The upper windows have sills on simpler corbels.

The eastern houses have more elaborate enframements. Their main entrances are enframed with deep lintels on angular brackets. The windows are fully enframed and have more complex lintels. There have been no major changes to any of these houses. Some of the dwellings have fireplaces.

At 328 East 69th, in the western row, there was the only significant addition or structural alteration to any of the houses when a garage was cut into the basement. Other houses have had doors or windows replaced. All the original cast iron railings have been removed and replaced.

The row is in the central portion of the block, with more extensively modified rowhouses on either side leading to high-rises that anchor the block at the intersections. At the east end is the First Hungarian Reformed Church of New York, designed by Emery Roth and also listed on the Register. The adjacent house is owned by the church and serves as its parsonage.

On the north side of the street are higher, more modern apartment buildings. The area as a whole is high-density urban mixed use development typical of Manhattan. Talent Unlimited High School is to the south on East 68th Street. Memorial Sloan-Kettering Cancer Center and Weill Cornell Medical School two blocks to the southeast.

== History ==
The Upper East Side had been gradually developing as the economy recovered from the Panic of 1873. In 1878, a housing boom began with the completion of the Third Avenue El, putting the neighborhood within easy commuting distance of Midtown and Lower Manhattan where most businesses were. The blocks to the east of Third were very quickly developed with speculative rows, which sold quickly.

At that time most were built in the Neo-Grec architectural style. Using forms and scale similar to the Italianate styles popular before and during the Civil War two decades earlier, the Neo-Grec differs in its detailing. Buildings in that style used angular, more geometric forms for their ornamentation, as opposed to the curvilinear forms preferred on Italianate buildings. These reflect the use of early stonecutting machines, which could not yet duplicate the latter.

The buildings in the western half, Nos. 322–332, were built first. Architect Jacob Valentine designed them for builder James E. Ray in 1879. Among the many Neo-Grec rowhouses Valentine built in the area at the time, there are few survivors other than these. Ray hired William J. Smith for the eastern buildings, begun later in 1879 and completed the following year.

There have been few changes to the exteriors of the buildings. The original cast iron railings on the stoops were replaced some time after 1945, when a photograph shows them all in place. In 1966, the basement of 328 East 69th was converted into a garage. The houses themselves have remained as newer high-rises have displaced most of the other rowhouses built in the early years of the Upper East Side, a rare surviving group of buildings from that era. But there has been substantial renovation of building interiors; for example, 342 East 69th Street has had new windows, plumbing, electricity, roof, floor boards, and cooling systems.

The buildings have had huge price appreciation in the last few decades. For example, building 342 was valued at $1.1 million in 1990; in 2004 it was valued at $2.9 million; by December 2010, it was valued at $4.7 million.

== See also ==
- National Register of Historic Places listings in Manhattan from 59th to 110th Streets

Other groups of historic houses on the Upper East Side:

- East 73rd Street Historic District
- East 78th Street Houses
- East 80th Street Houses
- Houses at 208-218 East 78th Street
