= Queens Community House =

- Founded: 1975; 51 years ago
- Tax ID no.: 11-2375583
- Legal status: 501(c)(3) nonprofit organization
- Purpose: Queens Community House provides individuals and families with the tools to enrich their lives and build healthy, inclusive communities.
- Headquarters: 108-69 62nd Drive; Forest Hills, Queens 11375, U.S.
- Coordinates: 40.7362377°N 73.850097°W
- Region served: Queens, New York
- Executive Director: Ben Thomases
- Revenue: $43,370,189 (2023)
- Employees: 400 (2023)
- Website: www.qchnyc.org
- Formerly called: Forest Hills Community House

Queens Community House (QCH) is a non-profit human services agency in Queens, New York that operates programs for children, young adults, families, and older adults. Like other settlement houses, QCH combines many community services under one roof. It is one of the largest human services organizations based in Queens, serving 25,000 individuals across 40 sites in 15 neighborhoods.

The flagship site is the Forest Hills Community Center, a 26,000 square foot facility at 108-25 62nd Drive in Forest Hills, Queens. It was renovated 2022–2024 for $16 million.

== History ==
In 1972, residents protested against Forest Hills Houses, a proposed public housing development with three 24-story buildings at 62nd Drive and 108th Street. It was part of Mayor John Lindsay's "scatter-site" plan to construct public housing in neighborhoods that had none (as opposed to concentrating public housing in poor neighborhoods). White middle-class residents believed that the public housing would depreciate the community's quality of life because poor residents would move into the housing. Advocates for the project accused residents of racism, since the proposed development's residents would be mostly people of minority races. Mario Cuomo, a Queens lawyer and the future Governor of New York, was assigned to mediate the dispute and succeeded in halving the size of the project. His compromise proposal also included the creation of a community center on the campus. The Forest Hills Community House was incorporated, with initial board members from both sides of the controversy, to operate the center.

In 2007, the organization changed its name to Queens Community House (QCH), to reflect its growth into numerous sites outside of Forest Hills. As of 2024, QCH operates 40 sites in 15 neighborhoods of Queens, including Long Island City, Jackson Heights, Elmhurst, Corona, Rego Park, Forest Hills, Kew Gardens, Briarwood, Jamaica, Springfield Gardens, Ozone Park, South Ozone Park, Flushing, Bayside, and Queens Village.

== Services ==
QCH's programs serve children, young adults, adults and families, and older adults.

=== Children and Youth Services ===
QCH has programs in 19 NYC public schools, including after-school and summer programs for elementary school and middle school students.

=== Young Adult Services ===
For young adults transitioning to adulthood, QCH's programs include teen/young adult centers, youth workforce initiatives, programs for struggling high school students, college counseling, summer employment programs, and tech training.

=== Adult and Family Services ===
For adults and families, QCH operates food pantries, a childcare network, housing assistance, family support services, and community organizing.

=== Older Adult Services ===
For older adults, QCH has 6 older adult centers, a social adult day program, home-delivered meals, a friendly visiting program, transportation services, and sponsors the Naturally Occurring Retirement Community in Forest Hills.

=== Other demographics ===
For immigrants, QCH provides immigration services and free English and citizenship classes. For women, QCH has young women's leadership programming. For the LGBT community, QCH has an LGBT teen center and an LGBT senior center.

== Advocacy and Organizing ==
In addition to providing direct services, QCH is engaged in advocacy and organizing efforts to address social issues affecting their participants, including affordable housing, public green space, and noncitizen voting rights.

== Financial ==
QCH's Fiscal Year 2025 budget is $39.2 million. Its funding comes from city, state and federal governments, foundations such as the Harry and Jeanette Weinberg Foundation and The Clark Foundation, and private donors. It has had 501(c)(3) tax-exempt status since its 1975 founding; its EIN is 11-2375583.

In late 2020, QCH purchased the Forest Hills Community Center, its original and largest program site, and from 2023-2024 undertook a $12-million renovation of the space. The administrative headquarters is located nearby at 108-69 62nd Drive.

QCH's annual gala raises about half a million dollars each year. Gala honorees have included Jack Lew, the 76th Secretary of the Treasury and later US Ambassador to Israel.

== Employees and Leadership ==
Queens Community House employs 500 staff. The executive director of QCH is Ben Thomases and the president of the board is Michael Stellman.

== See also ==
- Union Settlement, Lenox Hill Neighborhood House, similar organizations in Manhattan
