= Gaylord Starin White =

American social worker

- Born: March 3, 1864; New Rochelle, New York, US
- Died: November 25, 1931 (aged 67); New York City, US
- Education: University of the City of New York; Princeton University, B.A. 1886; Union Theological Seminary; University of Berlin
- Occupations: social worker, clergyman
- Known for: headworker, Union Settlement
- Spouse: Sophie Douglass Young
- Children: 4

Gaylord Starin White (March 3, 1864 – November 25, 1931) was an American social reformer and activist who was prominent in the settlement movement. He was the second and long-serving director (known as the "headworker") of New York City's Union Settlement and, at his death, the dean of students at Union Theological Seminary. A New York City Housing Authority center for the elderly bears his name, as did a summer camp in Arden, New York for inner-city children.

== Early life and education ==
White was born in New Rochelle, New York to Charles Trumbull White and Georgiana Starin. He attended the University of the City of New York (later known as New York University) for two years before transferring to Princeton University, from which he earned AB (1886) and AM (1899) degrees. He then attended Union Seminary and, after earning a Bachelor of Divinity in 1890, studied at the University of Berlin for two years. While returning to the US in 1892, he visited the original university settlement, Toynbee Hall, for two months.

== Social reform work ==
White was ordained to the Presbyterian ministry in 1892 and afterward was briefly the first assistant pastor at Rutgers Presbyterian Church. His first post as pastor was at City Park Chapel, 209 Concord Street, in the working-class Navy Yard section of Brooklyn, New York—starting in 1893. The Chapel was associated with the First Presbyterian Church (Brooklyn), under the leadership of Charles Cuthbert Hall (later the president of Union Theological Seminary). It was razed in 1896 and replaced with a building thereafter designated the "City Park Branch" of First Presbyterian.

City Park Branch was designed on the "institutional" church model, which had been pioneered by William S. Rainsford at St. George's Episcopal Church. Providing "opportunities for physical, intellectual and moral culture", its mission bore clear similarities to the burgeoning Settlement approach. White explained, "We aim to have an open church, an everyday church, on Institutional lines: in other words, a people's church working on the principle of self support." Although not referred to at the time as a Settlement house, it would come to be so categorized and is included in the Handbook of Settlements, published in 1911.

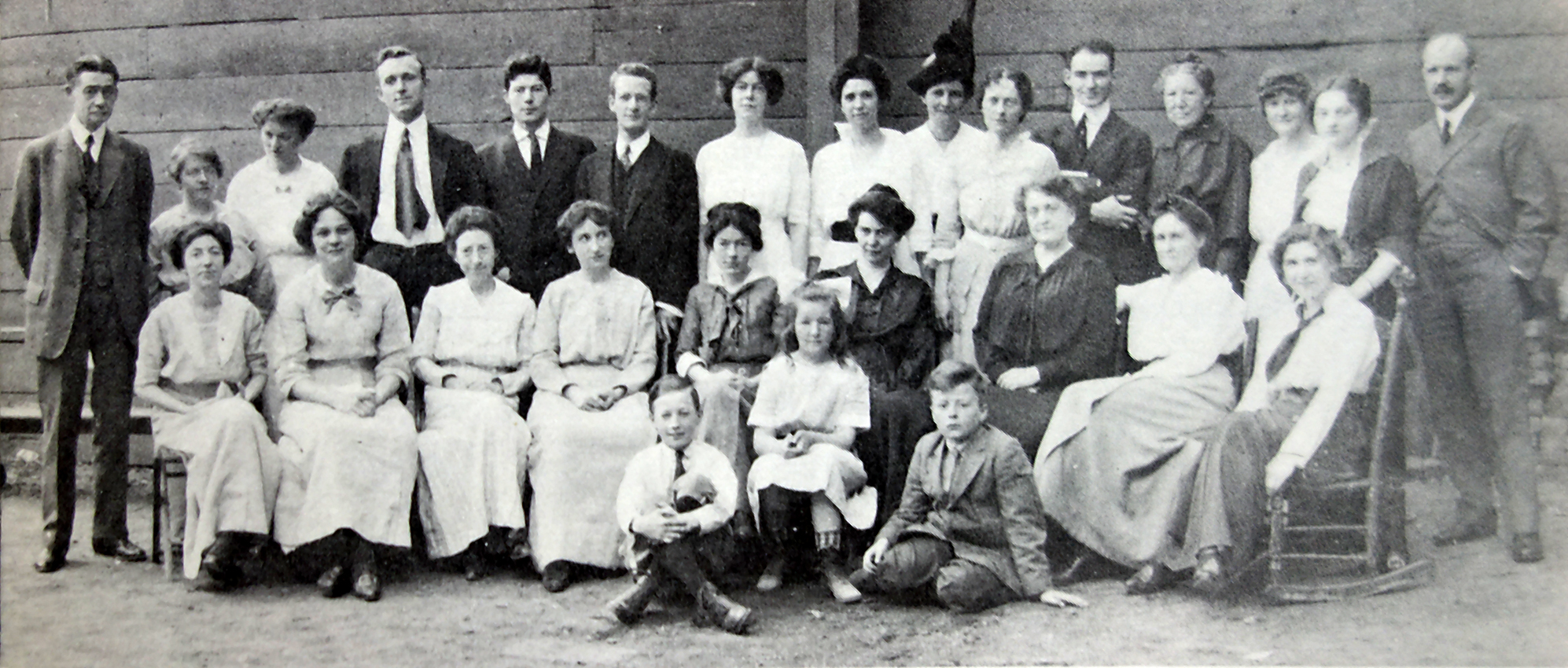
Headworker Gaylord Starin White (far left) and the staff of Union Settlement in 1912.

After eight years at the City Park branch, White followed Hall back to Union Theological Seminary (UTS) and became its director of field work in 1901. In this capacity he oversaw the development of Union Settlement and became its second "headworker"—residing there with his wife and four children until 1923. During this time, he also became professor of applied Christianity at UTS in 1914 and a lecturer at the New York School of Social Work from 1912 to 1915. In 1923, he took a position as UTS's director of the department of church and community and moved to a UTS apartment on the west side of Manhattan. In 1929 he was appointed dean of students at UTS. He worked in these capacities until his death in 1931.

== Personal life ==
On June 6, 1892, he married Sophie Douglass Young, with whom he had four children: Sophie Douglass, Charles Trumbull, Cleveland Stuart, and Katharine Gaylord. He died in his residence at Union Theological Seminary on November 25, 1931, of heart disease.

== Written work by White ==
- Gaylord S. White, "The Social Settlement after Twenty-Five Years," The Harvard Theological Review, vol. 4, no. 1 (Jan. 1911), 47–70.
- Gaylord S. White, "Social Training of Lay Workers", Religious Education, vol. 8 (1913), 83–87. PDF
- Gaylord S. White, "Reflections of a Settlement Worker," Scribner's Magazine LXXVI (July–December 1924), 633–638. PDF

== See also ==
- Frank Gardner Moore, White's brother-in-law by his sister, Anna Barnard White
- John H. Starin, White's first cousin, two times removed
- Starin's Glen Island
