= First Hungarian Reformed Church of New York =

Church in Manhattan, New York

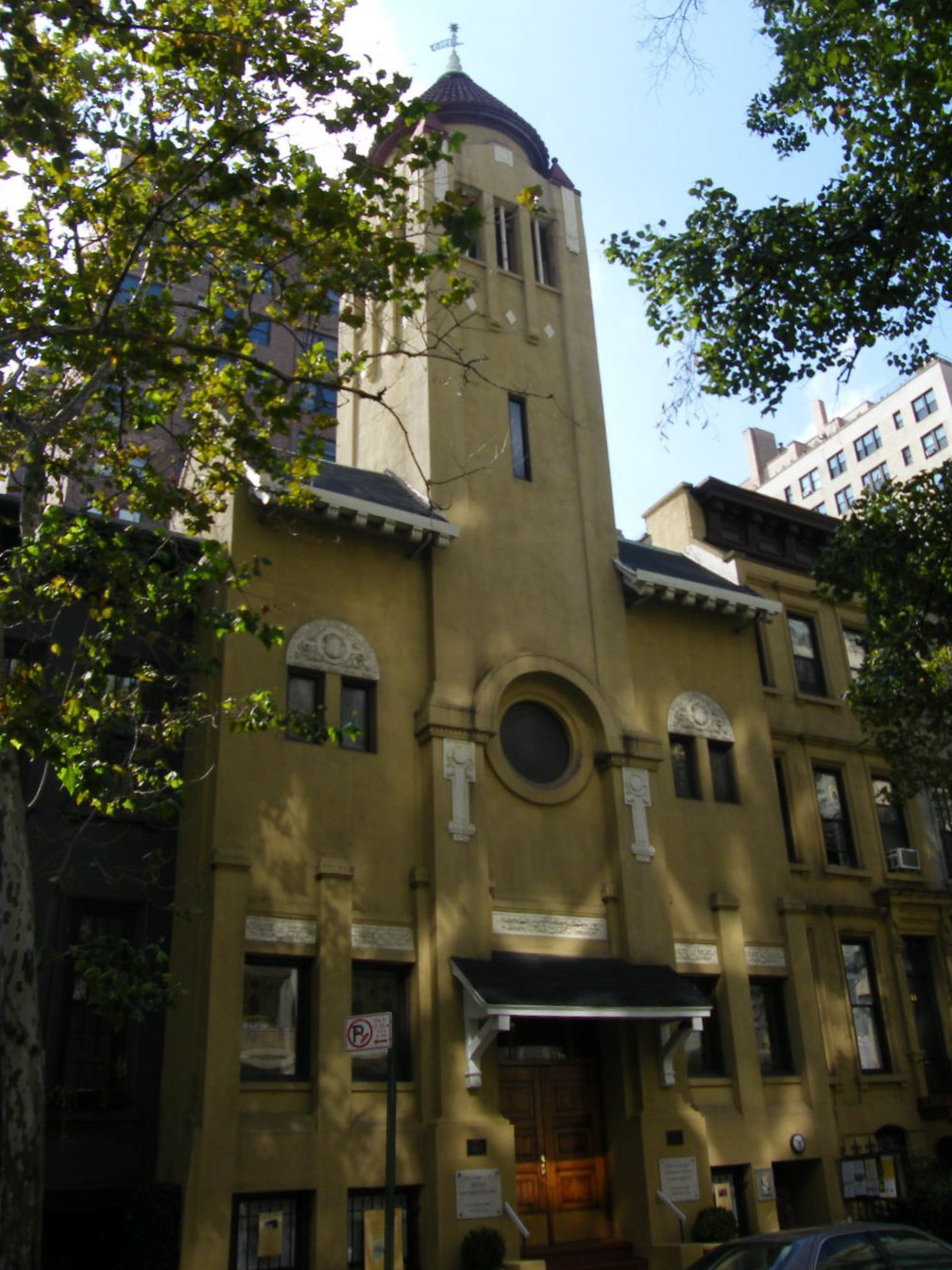
- North elevation, 2008

Religion
- Affiliation: United Church of Christ
- Leadership: Current Rev. Nt.Fogarasi Anita and Deák Lehel; Chief Elder: Balla István

Location
- Location: 346 East 69th Street, Upper East Side, New York, NY, USA
- Interactive map of First Hungarian Reformed Church of New York
- Coordinates: 40°45′58″N 73°57′30″W

Architecture
- Architect: Emery Roth
- Style: Hungarian vernacular
- General contractor: McDermott & Henigan
- Completed: 1916

Specifications
- Direction of façade: North
- Width: 35 feet (11 m)
- Spire: 1
- Spire height: 80 feet (24 m)
- Materials: Stucco, brick

Website
- Official website
- First Hungarian Reformed Church
- U.S. National Register of Historic Places
- New York State Register of Historic Places
- New York City Landmark
- Location within Manhattan Location within New York City Location within New York Location within the United States
- Location: 344-346 East 69th St., New York, New York
- Coordinates: 40°45′57″N 73°57′32″W
- Area: less than one acre
- Built: 1916
- Architect: Emery Roth; McDermott & Henigan
- NRHP reference No.: 00001012
- NYSRHP No.: 06101.011081
- NYCL No.: 2601

Significant dates
- Added to NRHP: 2000-08-31
- Designated NYSRHP: 2000-07-11
- Designated NYCL: 2019-06-11

The First Hungarian Reformed Church of New York (Hungarian: New York-i Első Magyar Református Egyház) is located on 346 East 69th Street on the Upper East Side of the New York City borough of Manhattan. It is a stucco-faced brick building, completed in 1916 in a Hungarian vernacular architectural style, housing a congregation established in 1895.

It is the only Christian religious building designed by Hungarian-born architect Emery Roth, later known for his apartment buildings on Central Park West. As one of two Hungarian Reformed Churches in Manhattan, it has been a focal point for the city's Hungarian-American community since its construction.

In 1983, its parsonage was listed on the National Register of Historic Places as a contributing property to the Rowhouses at 322–344 East 69th Street historic district to its immediate west. The parsonage was listed in its own right along with the church in 2000. Following the demolition of the German Evangelical Reformed Church a block to the south, it became the oldest church in the neighborhood. The building is also a New York City designated landmark since 2019.

== Buildings ==
The church is located at 346 East 69th Street, on the south side of the street midway between First and Second avenues. It is in the middle of a group of old rowhouses. Those on the west are among the few remaining from the early development of this part of the Upper East Side around 1880. The rowhouse on the church's west serves as its parsonage. Across the street are larger, taller apartment buildings dating to the first half of the 20th century. Similar high-rises are to the south. Leadership

The building itself is a two-story, three-bay structure with raised basement in brick faced with yellow stucco. A square bell tower rises from the center of a side-gabled roof; behind it the roof is flat. There is a slightly projecting main entrance at the center and a basement entrance on the west.

On the north-facing street facade's first floor are two windows on either side of the main entrance with piers on either side. They are topped with decorative ceramic rectangular panels. Above them, on the second story, are double windows topped with similarly decorated semicircular panels. In the middle, on the projecting section, is a large oculus with plaster surround.

The roofline is marked by a bracketed overhanging eave with exposed rafter tails. Above it, the bell tower rises, with a single narrow window on the north above the roof topped by three similar windows on each face at the top. Each corner is topped with pyramid-shaped pinnacles; the tower itself has a conical roof in red tile with a weathervane on top.

A pent roof with wooden knee braces, below another rectangular ceramic panel, shelters the main entrance. Below it are double wooden doors beneath a stained glass tripartite transom with an eagle in the center. It opens into a vestibule with steps leading into the nave.

The nave has a mosaic tile floor with Greek key border and marble wainscoting. A central aisle runs between two rows of original wooden pews. Full-height pilasters divide the walls into four bays. At the south end the walls are angled and filled with stained glass windows topped with a semicircular arch. A columbarium with bronze font is in the northeast corner.

Heating ducts are visible along the top of the west wall. The coffered ceiling is elliptical-arched with lateral beams springing from the pilaster capitals. The coffers themselves are intricately painted and gilded. In the center of the ceiling are stained glass skylights. The light they let in is supplemented by artificial light from hanging fixtures.

A stairwell in the northwest corner of the vestibule leads to the choir loft. It has marquetry panels with Hungarian folk art motifs below the balustrade. The church's basement has been remodeled into an auditorium with paneled walls and a dropped acoustic-tile ceiling. A door near the rear of the nave opens into the parsonage.

The parsonage is a three-story Neo-Grec brownstone rowhouse with raised basement and stoop. Like the others in the row, it has decorated door and window enframements, rusticated stones and a segmental arch window on the basement and a galvanized iron cornice with decorative brackets at the flat roof. Inside many original finishes remain, such as paneled doors, stair balustrade and high ceilings. The first floor is the church office, with the upper stories the living space.

== History ==
After the failure of the 1848 revolt against Habsburg rule, Hungarian refugees began settling in New York. They started Magyar Szamuzottek ("Hungarian Exiles' News"), the first Hungarian American newspaper. The community grew again in the 1880s when immigrants began coming to America for better economic opportunities. Most settled along Second Avenue, either between 1st and 10th streets or 55th and 72nd.

In 1895, The Rev. Bertalan Demeter established the First Hungarian Congregation, holding services in the Hope Chapel on 4th Street. Three years afterwards, in 1889, a new pastor, Zoltan Kuthy, led the congregation into joining the Hungarian Reformed churches that had already been established elsewhere in the U.S. The church grew, and bought a house on East 7th Street for services.

The 1910 census indicated that over 75,000 New Yorkers identified as having Hungarian origins. Most were from the regions of the Austro-Hungarian Empire that, in addition to modern Hungary, include portions of the Czech Republic, Austria, Slovakia, and Slovenia. Ethnically, some were Romanian, Slovak and Croatian. They were of diverse religious backgrounds, mostly Catholic or Eastern Orthodox, but with significant Protestants and Jewish populations.

In 1914, the church sold its house and bought the three lots on East 69th Street. Two of the existing houses were demolished to clear a site for the church; the one that remained was renovated for use as a parsonage. Emery Roth, a Hungarian immigrant from Gálszécs, was retained to design the new building. It was only his second religious building, and the only Christian building ever for Roth, who designed several synagogues in the city. Since he was Jewish, it is likely that he was chosen for his familiarity with Hungarian vernacular architecture and close ties with the Hungarian community.

Roth's design reflects many Hungarian church building traditions, in keeping with the practice of many immigrant communities of the time. The stucco exterior is accented with inlaid faience tile, overhanging roof with rafter tails, and clay-tiled conical tower. Inside, the coffered ceiling is a common element in churches in eastern Hungary and Transylvania. Its 322 individual coffers are handpainted with Hungarian folk motifs. It has been called "a charmingly exotic adaptation of Hungarian vernacular architecture".

The new building was consecrated in early 1916, using the bell from the old church. Since then there have been few changes other than the remodeling of the parsonage. The columbarium was added to the nave in the 1950s and the basement was remodeled at some point. Old photographs also show all roofs having the same clay tiles as the tower.

New York's Hungarian community reached its zenith of almost 125,000 in the middle of the 20th century, the largest of any city in the nation. The area around the church had a strong Hungarian presence, with many bookstores and restaurants catering to its tastes. It declined over the rest of the century as the descendants of the original immigrants gradually assimilated and moved to Queens or the suburbs. New immigrants attended the church but often settled outside Manhattan as the area had begun to gentrify. The church continues to serve them, holding services in Hungarian every Sunday.

== See also ==
- National Register of Historic Places listings in Manhattan from 59th to 110th Streets
