= National Register of Historic Places listings in Manhattan from 59th to 110th Streets =

The following properties and districts on Manhattan Island from 59th to 110th Streets, a significant portion of the New York City borough of Manhattan, are listed on the National Register of Historic Places. For properties and districts in other parts of Manhattan and the other islands of New York County, see National Register of Historic Places listings in Manhattan. The locations of National Register properties and districts (at least for all showing latitude and longitude coordinates below) may be seen in an online map by clicking on "Map of all coordinates".

This National Park Service list is complete through NPS recent listings posted August 21, 2026.

Contents: Counties in New York
Albany (Albany) – Allegany – Bronx – Broome – Cattaraugus – Cayuga – Chautauqua – Chemung – Chenango – Clinton – Columbia – Cortland – Delaware – Dutchess (Poughkeepsie, Rhinebeck) – Erie (Buffalo) – Essex – Franklin – Fulton – Genesee – Greene – Hamilton – Herkimer – Jefferson – Kings – Lewis – Livingston – Madison – Monroe (Rochester) – Montgomery – Nassau – New York (Below 14th Street, 14th to 59th Streets, 59th to 110th Streets, Above 110th Street, Islands) – Niagara (Niagara Falls) – Oneida – Onondaga (Syracuse) – Ontario – Orange – Orleans – Oswego – Otsego – Putnam – Queens – Rensselaer – Richmond – Rockland – St. Lawrence – Saratoga – Schenectady – Schoharie – Schuyler – Seneca – Steuben – Suffolk – Sullivan – Tioga – Tompkins – Ulster – Warren – Washington – Wayne – Westchester (Northern, Southern, New Rochelle, Peekskill, Yonkers) – Wyoming – Yates

== Listings from 59th to 110th Streets ==
	Name on the Register	Image	Date listed	Location	City or town	Description
1	110th Street–Cathedral Parkway Subway Station (IRT)	110th Street–Cathedral Parkway Subway Station (IRT)	September 17, 2004 (#04001019)	Junction of Broadway, W. 110th St., and Cathedral Pkwy. 40°48′14″N 73°58′01″W	Morningside Heights	Subway station (1 train)
2	28th Police Precinct Station House	28th Police Precinct Station House	November 18, 2024 (#100010988)	177 East 104th Street; 40°47′26″N 73°56′46″W	East Harlem	
3	69th Street Transfer Bridge	69th Street Transfer Bridge	June 26, 2003 (#03000577)	Hudson River W of the West Side Highway bet. W 66th and 70th Sts. 40°46′44″N 73°59′26″W	Riverside Park	
4	72nd Street Subway Station (IRT)	72nd Street Subway Station (IRT)	September 17, 2004 (#04001017)	jct. of Broadway and W. 72nd St. 40°46′42″N 73°58′57″W	Upper West Side	Subway station (1, 2, and 3 trains)
5	79th Street Subway Station (IRT)	79th Street Subway Station (IRT)	September 17, 2004 (#04001018)	Jxt. of W. 79th St. and Broadway; 40°47′01″N 73°58′50″W	Upper West Side	Subway station (1 and 2 trains)
6	86th Street Subway Station (Dual System IRT)	86th Street Subway Station (Dual System IRT)	March 30, 2005 (#05000236)	Under Lexington Ave., bet E. 85th and E. 87th Sts. 40°46′46″N 73°57′22″W	Upper East Side	Subway station (4, 5, 6, and <6> trains)
7	American Museum of Natural History	American Museum of Natural History	June 24, 1976 (#76001235)	Central Park West and 77th St. 40°46′53″N 73°58′28″W	Upper West Side	
8	Ansonia Hotel	Ansonia Hotel	January 10, 1980 (#80002665)	2101–2119 Broadway; 40°46′48″N 73°58′57″W	Upper West Side	
9	Apartment at 1261 Madison Avenue	Apartment at 1261 Madison Avenue	October 29, 1982 (#82001185)	1261 Madison Ave. 40°47′00″N 73°57′25″W	Upper East Side	Designed by Buchman & Fox
10	Apthorp Apartments	Apthorp Apartments	January 30, 1978 (#78001868)	2201-2219 Broadway; 40°47′02″N 73°58′53″W	Upper West Side	
11	Association Residence Nursing Home	Association Residence Nursing Home	February 20, 1975 (#75001201)	891 Amsterdam Ave. (@ 104); 40°47′55″N 73°58′01″W	Upper West Side	
12	George F. Baker Jr. and Sr. Houses	George F. Baker Jr. and Sr. Houses	June 3, 1982 (#82003367)	67, 69, and 75 East 93rd Street; 40°47′06″N 73°57′15″W	Upper East Side	
13	James Baldwin House	James Baldwin House	September 3, 2019 (#100004332)	137 West 71st Street; 40°46′39″N 73°58′49″W	Upper West Side	Apartment within was home to African-American writer James Baldwin from 1965 until his death in 1987
14	Barbizon Hotel for Women	Barbizon Hotel for Women	October 29, 1982 (#82001186)	140 E. 63rd St. 40°45′53″N 73°57′58″W	Lenox Hill	
15	Beacon Theater and Hotel	Beacon Theater and Hotel	November 4, 1982 (#82001187)	2124 Broadway; 40°46′50″N 73°58′52″W	Upper West Side	Composed of the Beacon Theatre and the Hotel Beacon
16	Belnord Apartments	Belnord Apartments	April 23, 1980 (#80002670)	225 W. 86th St. 40°47′18″N 73°58′34″W	Upper West Side	
17	Building at 133 East 80th Street	Building at 133 East 80th Street	August 16, 2010 (#10000553)	133 E. 80th St. 40°46′33″N 73°57′31″W	Upper East Side	Architecturally distinctive building home to McGeorge Bundy and other notable public figures
18	Building at 210 East 68th Street	Building at 210 East 68th Street	June 16, 2005 (#05000619)	210 E. 68th St. 40°46′01″N 73°57′46″W	Lenox Hill	
19	Building at 45 East 66th Street	Building at 45 East 66th Street	May 6, 1980 (#80002674)	45 E. 66th St. 40°46′05″N 73°58′05″W	Lenox Hill	
20	James A. Burden House and Otto H. Kahn House	James A. Burden House and Otto H. Kahn House	September 12, 2006 (#06000821)	7 and 1 E. 91st St. (@ 5th Avenue); 40°47′05″N 73°57′29″W	Carnegie Hill	Composed of the James A. Burden House and Otto H. Kahn House; now the Convent of the Sacred Heart
21	Andrew Carnegie Mansion	Andrew Carnegie Mansion	November 13, 1966 (#66000536)	2 E. 91st St. (@ 5th Avenue); 40°47′04″N 73°57′29″W	Carnegie Hill	Now the Cooper-Hewitt, National Design Museum
22	Central Park	Central Park	October 15, 1966 (#66000538)	Bounded by Central Park S., 5th Ave., Central Park W., 110th St. 40°46′57″N 73°57′57″W	Manhattan	Park designed by Frederick Law Olmsted and Calvert Vaux is their best-known work. One of the world's most famous parks.
23	Central Park West Historic District	Central Park West Historic District	November 9, 1982 (#82001189)	Central Park West between 61st and 97th Sts. 40°46′44″N 73°58′32″W	Upper West Side	Unique and distinctive skyline over park
24	Central Savings Bank	Central Savings Bank	September 8, 1983 (#83001720)	2100–2108 Broadway; 40°46′47″N 73°58′52″W	Upper West Side	aka Apple Bank for Savings
25	The Church of the Heavenly Rest and the Chapel of the Beloved Disciple	The Church of the Heavenly Rest and the Chapel of the Beloved Disciple	March 3, 2021 (#100006215)	1085 5th Ave. 40°46′44″N 73°57′34″W	Carnegie Hill	
26	Church of St. Edward the Martyr	Church of St. Edward the Martyr	April 29, 2025 (#100011763)	8-14 East 109th Street; 40°47′45″N 73°56′56″W	East Harlem	
27	Church of St. Ignatius Loyola Complex	Church of St. Ignatius Loyola Complex	July 24, 1980 (#80002679)	Park Ave., 83rd and 84th Sts. 40°46′44″N 73°57′34″W	Yorkville	
28	Church of St. Paul the Apostle	Church of St. Paul the Apostle	December 5, 1991 (#91001723)	415 W. 59th St. 40°46′11″N 73°59′07″W	Lincoln Square	
29	City and Suburban Homes Company's First Avenue Estate Historic District	City and Suburban Homes Company's First Avenue Estate Historic District	August 1, 1986 (#86002622)	1168–1200 First Ave., 401–429 E. Sixty-fourth, and 402–430 E. Sixty-fifth Sts. 40°45′45″N 73°57′32″W	Lenox Hill	
30	City and Suburban Homes Company's York Avenue Estate and Shively Sanitary Tenements Historic District	City and Suburban Homes Company's York Avenue Estate and Shively Sanitary Tenements Historic District	September 15, 1994 (#86003823)	Roughly bounded by York Ave., E. 77th St., Franklin D. Roosevelt Dr., and E. 79th St. 40°46′13″N 73°56′59″W	Lenox Hill and Yorkville	Consists of the City and Suburban Homes Company's York Avenue Estate and the Cherokee Apartments
31	Claremont Stables	Claremont Stables	April 16, 1980 (#80002683)	173–177 W. 89th St. 40°47′22″N 73°58′24″W	Upper West Side	
32	Congregation B'nai Jeshurun Synagogue and Community House	Congregation B'nai Jeshurun Synagogue and Community House	June 2, 1989 (#89000474)	257 W. 88th St. and 270 W. 89th St. 40°47′24″N 73°58′35″W	Upper West Side	
33	Congregation Ohab Zedek	Congregation Ohab Zedek	August 18, 2017 (#100001487)	118–120 & 122–124 W. 95th St. 40°47′33″N 73°58′08″W	Upper West Side	
34	Control House on 72nd Street	Control House on 72nd Street	May 6, 1980 (#80002684)	W. 72nd St. and Broadway; 40°46′42″N 73°58′57″W	Upper West Side	Subway control house for the 1, 2, and 3 trains.
35	Lucy Drexel Dahlgren House	Lucy Drexel Dahlgren House	July 20, 1989 (#89000946)	15 E. 96th St. 40°47′13″N 73°57′15″W	Carnegie Hill and East Harlem	
36	Dakota Apartments	Dakota Apartments	April 26, 1972 (#72000869)	1 W. 72nd St. (@ CPW); 40°46′36″N 73°58′35″W	Upper West Side	Architecturally distinctive late 19th-century apartment complex on Central Park; used for exteriors in Rosemary's Baby and site of John Lennon's murder.
37	The Dorilton	The Dorilton	September 8, 1983 (#83001723)	171 W. 71st St. 40°46′41″N 73°58′55″W	Upper West Side	
38	Duke Residence	Duke Residence	December 7, 1989 (#89002090)	1009 Fifth Ave. (@ 82nd); 40°46′43″N 73°57′45″W	Museum Mile	
39	James B. Duke House	James B. Duke House	November 10, 1977 (#77000956)	1 E. 78th St. 40°46′35″N 73°57′51″W	Museum Mile	Associated with James Buchanan Duke
40	East 73rd Street Historic District	East 73rd Street Historic District	July 22, 1982 (#82003374)	161-182 E. 73rd St. 40°46′14″N 73°57′41″W	Lenox Hill	Small enclave of intact former carriage houses of area's wealthy residents
41	East 78th Street Houses	East 78th Street Houses	March 25, 1980 (#80002685)	157, 159, 161, and 163–165 E. 78th St. 40°46′26″N 73°57′32″W	Upper East Side	Oldest townhouses on the Upper East Side
42	East 80th Street Houses	East 80th Street Houses	March 26, 1980 (#80002686)	116–130 E. 80th St. 40°46′00″N 73°57′36″W	Upper East Side	Intact high-end 1920s townhouses; homes of Vincent Astor and George Whitney
43	First Battery Armory	First Battery Armory	February 20, 2013 (#13000028)	56 W. 66th St. 40°46′23″N 73°58′51″W	Upper West Side	Intact, exemplary 1903 armory now converted into TV studio
44	First Hungarian Reformed Church	First Hungarian Reformed Church	August 31, 2000 (#00001012)	344–346 East 69th St. 40°45′57″N 73°57′32″W	Lenox Hill	1916 Emery Roth church in Hungarian vernacular style is his only Christian religious building
45	Founder's Hall, The Rockefeller University	Founder's Hall, The Rockefeller University	September 13, 1974 (#74001269)	66th St. and York Ave. 40°45′47″N 73°57′18″W	Lenox Hill	
46	The Frick Collection and Frick Art Reference Library Building	The Frick Collection and Frick Art Reference Library Building	October 6, 2008 (#08001091)	1 E. 70th St. and 12 E. 71st St. 40°46′22″N 73°58′02″W	Upper East Side	Former mansion containing the Frick Collection museum and the Frick Art Reference Library
47	Archibald Gracie Mansion	Archibald Gracie Mansion	May 12, 1975 (#75001205)	East End Ave. at 88th St. 40°46′34″N 73°56′36″W	Yorkville	New York City mayor's residence (HHT)
48	Solomon R. Guggenheim Museum	Solomon R. Guggenheim Museum	May 19, 2005 (#05000443)	1071 Fifth Ave. (@ 88th); 40°46′58″N 73°57′34″W	Museum Mile	Frank Lloyd Wright's best-known late work
49	Barbara Rutherford Hatch House	Barbara Rutherford Hatch House	June 9, 1983 (#83001728)	153 E. 63rd St. 40°45′52″N 73°57′57″W	Lenox Hill	
50	Henderson Place Historic District	Henderson Place Historic District	June 20, 1974 (#74001271)	Henderson Pl. (E86th nr East End Ave); 40°46′31″N 73°56′42″W	Yorkville	
51	Holy Trinity Church, St. Christopher House and Parsonage	Holy Trinity Church, St. Christopher House and Parsonage	May 30, 1980 (#80002694)	312–316 and 332 E. 88th St. 40°46′41″N 73°56′59″W	Upper East Side	
52	House at 49 East 80th Street	House at 49 East 80th Street	November 15, 2007 (#07001193)	49 E 80th St. 40°46′44″N 73°57′40″W	Upper East Side	
53	Houses at 1026–1028 Fifth Ave.	Houses at 1026–1028 Fifth Ave.	February 12, 1999 (#99000197)	1026–1028 Fifth Ave. 40°46′47″N 73°57′42″W	Museum Mile	
54	Houses at 120 and 122 East 92nd Street	Houses at 120 and 122 East 92nd Street	October 29, 1982 (#82001195)	120–122 East 92nd St. 40°47′00″N 73°57′15″W	Upper East Side	
55	Houses at 146–156 East 89th Street	Houses at 146–156 East 89th Street	June 3, 1982 (#82003378)	146–156 E. 89th St. 40°46′52″N 73°57′15″W	Upper East Side	
56	Houses at 208–218 East 78th Street	Houses at 208–218 East 78th Street	June 30, 1983 (#83001732)	208–218 E. 78th St. 40°46′23″N 73°57′28″W	Upper East Side	Five remaining Civil War-era townhouses of an original row of 16; rounded window lintels unusual in Italianate buildings
57	LANAI (yacht)	LANAI (yacht)	February 2, 2018 (#100002077)	79th Street Boat Basin; 40°47′09″N 73°59′11″W	Upper West Side	Earliest extant residential yacht by John Trumpy & Sons, built 1911. Sank in Long Island Sound November 1, 2021
58	Level Club	Level Club	April 9, 1984 (#84002784)	253 W. 73rd St. 40°46′49″N 73°59′00″W	Upper West Side	
59	William Goadby Loew House	William Goadby Loew House	July 15, 1982 (#82003384)	56 E. 93rd St. 40°47′06″N 73°57′20″W	Upper East Side	
60	Madison Avenue Facade of the Squadron A Armory	Madison Avenue Facade of the Squadron A Armory	March 24, 1972 (#72000877)	Madison Ave. between 94th and 95th Sts. 40°47′10″N 73°57′18″W	Carnegie Hill	
61	Master Building	Master Building	February 23, 2016 (#16000036)	310 Riverside Drive; 40°48′02″N 73°58′16″W	Upper West Side	Pioneering Art Deco apartment building dating to 1929
62	Metro North Plaza	Metro North Plaza	June 10, 2024 (#100010393)	307 East 101st Street, 345 East 101st Street, 310 East 102nd Street; 40°47′15″N 73°56′36″W	East Harlem	
63	Metropolitan Museum of Art	Metropolitan Museum of Art	June 24, 1986 (#86003556)	Fifth Ave. at East 82nd St. 40°46′44″N 73°57′47″W	Museum Mile	Designed by Richard Morris Hunt as the main structure of the Metropolitan Museum of Art
64	Lewis G. Morris House	Lewis G. Morris House	February 12, 1977 (#77000960)	100 E. 85th St. 40°46′46″N 73°57′28″W	Upper East Side	
65	Municipal Asphalt Plant	Municipal Asphalt Plant	May 23, 1980 (#80002702)	East End Ave. between 90th and 91st Sts. 40°46′42″N 73°56′39″W	Yorkville	
66	New York Cancer Hospital	New York Cancer Hospital	April 29, 1977 (#77000961)	2 W. 106th St. 40°47′52″N 73°57′39″W	Manhattan Valley	Converted to condominiums; also known as Towers Nursing Home
67	New York Public Library, Yorkville Branch	New York Public Library, Yorkville Branch	July 15, 1982 (#82003386)	222 E. 79th St. 40°46′25″N 73°57′25″W	Yorkville	
68	Park Avenue Historic District	Park Avenue Historic District	August 29, 2010 (#10000588)	900–1240 Park Ave. 40°46′53″N 73°57′23″W	Upper East Side	Many architecturally distinguished apartment houses from late 19th and early 20th centuries
69	Park Avenue Houses	Park Avenue Houses	January 3, 1980 (#80002708)	680, 684, 686 and 690 Park Ave. (@ 68th); 40°46′03″N 73°57′59″W	Lenox Hill	
70	Park East Synagogue, Congregation Zichron Ephraim	Park East Synagogue, Congregation Zichron Ephraim	August 18, 1983 (#83001738)	163 E. 67th St. 40°46′01″N 73°57′50″W	Lenox Hill	
71	Pomander Walk District	Pomander Walk District	September 8, 1983 (#83001739)	261–267 W. 94th St., 260–274 W. 95th St. and Pomander Walk; 40°47′38″N 73°58′25″W	Upper West Side	
72	Public School 109	Public School 109	September 22, 2000 (#00001159)	215 East 99th St. 40°47′13″N 73°56′51″W	East Harlem	
73	Public School 9	Public School 9	August 3, 1987 (#87001258)	466 W. End Ave. 40°47′11″N 73°58′46″W	Upper West Side	
74	Red House	Red House	September 8, 1983 (#83001742)	350 W. 85th St. 40°47′20″N 73°58′51″W	Upper West Side	
75	Isaac L. Rice Mansion	Isaac L. Rice Mansion	June 25, 1980 (#80002711)	346 W. 89th St. 40°47′29″N 73°58′45″W	Upper West Side	also known as Isaac L. and Julia B. Rice House: "Villa Julia"; now Yeshiva Ketana of Manhattan
76	Riverside Drive–West 80th–81st Streets Historic District	Riverside Drive–West 80th–81st Streets Historic District	May 10, 1984 (#84002790)	Riverside Dr., W. 80th and W. 81st Sts. 40°47′28″N 73°58′56″W	Upper West Side	
77	Riverside Park and Drive	Riverside Park and Drive	September 2, 1983 (#83001743)	From 72nd St. to 129th St. 40°47′53″N 73°58′31″W	Upper West Side to Inwood	First major Robert Moses project in Manhattan; speeded up travel time to Bronx and Westchester and made river accessible via park
78	Riverside–West 105th Street Historic District	Riverside–West 105th Street Historic District	August 19, 1980 (#80002712)	Roughly bounded by W. End Ave., Riverside Dr., W. 104th and W. 106th Sts. 40°48′05″N 73°58′14″W	Upper West Side	
79	John S. Rogers House	John S. Rogers House	June 30, 1983 (#83001744)	53 E. 79th St. 40°46′34″N 73°57′43″W	Upper East Side	1917 Renaissance Revival mansion has been home to city's oldest cultural institution, New York Society Library, since 1937
80	Sara Delano Roosevelt Memorial House	Sara Delano Roosevelt Memorial House	March 28, 1980 (#80002713)	47 and 49 E. 65th St. 40°46′00″N 73°58′05″W	Lenox Hill	
81	Rowhouses at 322–344 East 69th Street	Rowhouses at 322–344 East 69th Street	September 7, 1984 (#84002793)	322–344 E. 69th St. 40°45′58″N 73°57′31″W	Upper East Side	Group of remaining low-rise townhouses from late 19th century
82	Row Houses at 854-858 West End Avenue and 254 West 102nd Street	Row Houses at 854-858 West End Avenue and 254 West 102nd Street	March 3, 2021 (#100006218)	854-858 West End Ave. and 254 West 102nd St. Wikidata Q112628238; 40°47′56″N 73°58′13″W	Upper West Side	
83	St. Cecilia's Church and Convent	St. Cecilia's Church and Convent	February 2, 1984 (#84002796)	112–120 E. 106th St. 40°47′32″N 73°56′52″W	East Harlem	
84	St. Ignatius of Antioch Episcopal Church	St. Ignatius of Antioch Episcopal Church	November 30, 1999 (#99001442)	552 W. End Ave. 40°47′21″N 73°58′40″W	Upper West Side	
85	St. Jean Baptiste Church and Rectory	St. Jean Baptiste Church and Rectory	April 23, 1980 (#80002720)	1067–1071 Lexington Ave. 40°46′21″N 73°57′38″W	Lenox Hill	1910 church is one of few Catholic churches in city with dome and only one besides St. Patrick's Cathedral to have stained glass made in Chartres. Architect Nicholas Serracino's only work in New York City won a prize in an international competition.
86	St. Michael's Church	St. Michael's Church	November 15, 1996 (#96001354)	225 W. 99th St. 40°47′46″N 73°58′10″W	Upper West Side	
87	St. Vincent Ferrer Church and Priory	St. Vincent Ferrer Church and Priory	June 14, 1984 (#84002800)	869 and 871 Lexington Ave. 40°45′58″N 73°57′55″W	Upper East Side	1916 Bertram Goodhue Gothic church has unusual touches like Crucifixion carving on front entrance and paintings at Stations of the Cross inside. Complemented by 1880 William Schickel priory.
88	William Schickel House	William Schickel House	December 6, 2004 (#04001326)	52 E. 83rd St. 40°46′43″N 73°57′37″W	Upper East Side	
89	Schinasi House	Schinasi House	April 23, 1980 (#80002714)	351 Riverside Dr. 40°48′11″N 73°58′09″W	Manhattan Valley	
90	Seventh Regiment Armory	Seventh Regiment Armory	April 14, 1975 (#75001208)	643 Park Ave. 40°46′01″N 73°57′58″W	Upper East Side	
91	Sidewalk Clock at 1501 3rd Avenue, Manhattan	Sidewalk Clock at 1501 3rd Avenue, Manhattan	April 18, 1985 (#85000926)	1501 3rd Ave. (@ 85th); 40°46′40″N 73°57′16″W	Upper East Side	
92	Sidewalk Clock, 783 Fifth Avenue	Sidewalk Clock, 783 Fifth Avenue	April 18, 1985 (#85000930)	783 5th Ave. 40°45′52″N 73°58′24″W	Lenox Hill	Historic sidewalk clock in front of The Sherry-Netherland
93	Harry F. Sinclair House	Harry F. Sinclair House	June 2, 1978 (#78001882)	2 E. 79th St. 40°46′36″N 73°57′50″W	Upper East Side	
94	Abigail Adams Smith Museum	Abigail Adams Smith Museum	January 12, 1973 (#73001223)	421 E. 61st St. 40°45′37″N 73°57′37″W	Lenox Hill	Also known as Mount Vernon Hotel Museum
95	Sofia Warehouse	Sofia Warehouse	September 27, 1984 (#84002801)	43 W. 61st St. 40°46′13″N 73°59′01″W	Upper West Side	Also known as "Kent Automatic Garages"
96	Stables at 167, 169 and 171 West 89th Street	Stables at 167, 169 and 171 West 89th Street	August 25, 1983 (#83001747)	167–171 W. 89th St. 40°47′21″N 73°58′23″W	Upper West Side	
97	Studio Apartments	Studio Apartments	May 19, 1983 (#83001748)	44 W. 77th St. 40°46′48″N 73°58′34″W	Upper West Side	
98	Substation 7	Substation 7	February 9, 2006 (#06000027)	1782 Third Avenue (@ 99th); 40°47′13″N 73°56′55″W	Upper East Side	
99	Temple Israel of the City of New York	Temple Israel of the City of New York	August 4, 2023 (#100009191)	210 West 91st St. 40°47′28″N 73°58′23″W	Upper West Side	Listing is for the congregation's 1920 building.
100	Three Arts Club	Three Arts Club	May 23, 2024 (#100010346)	340 West 85th Street; 40°47′20″N 73°58′47″W	Upper West Side	
101	Townhouses at 352 and 353 Riverside Dr.	Townhouses at 352 and 353 Riverside Dr.	September 1, 2005 (#05000944)	352 and 353 Riverside Dr. 40°48′11″N 73°58′10″W	Upper West Side	
102	Treadwell Farm Historic District	Treadwell Farm Historic District	May 27, 2004 (#04000541)	E. 61st and 62nd Sts. bet. Second and Third Aves. 40°45′45″N 73°57′53″W	Lenox Hill	
103	Trinity Lutheran Church of Manhattan	Trinity Lutheran Church of Manhattan	September 16, 2009 (#09000722)	164 W. 100th St. 40°47′46″N 73°58′05″W	Upper West Side	
104	Upper East Side Historic District	Upper East Side Historic District	September 7, 1984 (#84002803)	Roughly bounded by 3rd and 5th Aves., 59th and 79th Sts. 40°46′11″N 73°57′59″W	Upper East Side	There was a boundary increase on September 12, 2006 (refnum 06000822)
105	US Post Office-Lenox Hill Station	US Post Office-Lenox Hill Station	May 11, 1989 (#88002363)	221 E. 70th St. 40°46′05″N 73°57′38″W	Lenox Hill	
106	Mrs. Graham Fair Vanderbilt House	Mrs. Graham Fair Vanderbilt House	October 29, 1982 (#82001206)	60 E. 93rd St. 40°47′05″N 73°57′19″W	Upper East Side	Also known as Lycee Francais de New York
107	Giuseppe Verdi Monument	Giuseppe Verdi Monument	October 4, 1990 (#90002223)	Verdi Square Park (72nd at Broadway); 40°46′45″N 73°58′55″W	Upper West Side	
108	Gertrude Rhinelander Waldo Mansion	Gertrude Rhinelander Waldo Mansion	May 6, 1980 (#80002727)	867 Madison Ave. 40°46′17″N 73°57′57″W	Lenox Hill	(also known as Rhinelander Mansion)
109	Felix M. Warburg House	Felix M. Warburg House	October 29, 1982 (#82001207)	1109 5th Ave., at 92nd 40°47′07″N 73°57′27″W	Upper East Side	
110	West 67th Street Artists' Colony Historic District	West 67th Street Artists' Colony Historic District	July 11, 1985 (#85001522)	1–50 W. 67th St. 40°45′58″N 73°58′13″W	Upper West Side	
111	West 73rd–74th Street Historic District	West 73rd–74th Street Historic District	September 8, 1983 (#83001752)	73rd, 74th Sts. and Columbus Ave. 40°46′40″N 73°58′38″W	Upper West Side	
112	West 76th Street Historic District	West 76th Street Historic District	July 24, 1980 (#80002728)	W. 76th St. 40°46′45″N 73°58′34″W	Upper West Side	
113	West End Collegiate Church and Collegiate School	West End Collegiate Church and Collegiate School	May 6, 1980 (#80002729)	W. End Ave. and W. 77th St. 40°46′58″N 73°58′55″W	Upper West Side	
114	West End Presbyterian Church and Parish House	West End Presbyterian Church and Parish House	December 30, 2011 (#11000969)	165 W. 105th St. 40°47′59″N 73°57′57″W	Upper West Side	Located on 105th St. per NRHP nomination form and church website; incorrectly listed as on 165th St. in the January 6, 2012 NPS "Weekly List of Actions Taken"
115	West Side Unitarian Church–Congregation Ramath Orah	West Side Unitarian Church–Congregation Ramath Orah	September 17, 2015 (#15000608)	550 W. 110th St. 40°48′13″N 73°57′58″W	Upper West Side	Orthodox Jewish congregation that fled Luxembourg during World War II moved into unfinished 1921 church
116	Gaylord White Houses	Gaylord White Houses	November 27, 2024 (#100011075)	2029 Second Avenue; 40°47′23″N 73°56′36″W		
117	Zion-St. Mark's Evangelical Lutheran Church	Zion-St. Mark's Evangelical Lutheran Church	March 23, 1995 (#95000335)	339–341 E. 84th St. 40°46′34″N 73°57′05″W	Yorkville	

== See also ==
- List of New York City Designated Landmarks in Manhattan from 59th to 110th Streets
- County: National Register of Historic Places listings in New York County, New York
- State: National Register of Historic Places listings in New York
