= 133 East 80th Street =

Apartment building in Manhattan, New York

- Building at 133 East 80th Street
- U.S. National Register of Historic Places
- New York State Register of Historic Places
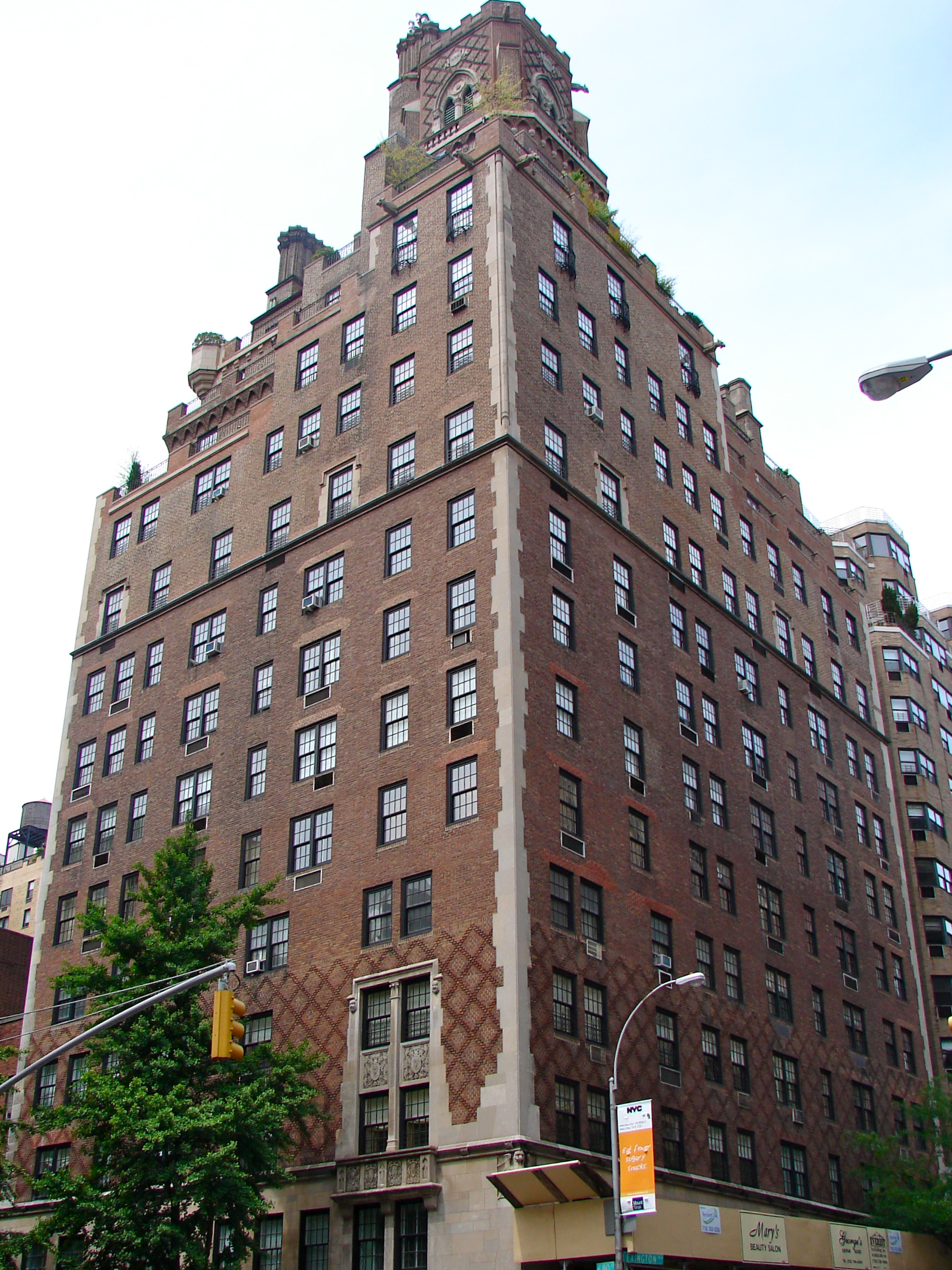

- Location within Manhattan Location within New York City Location within New York Location within the United States
- Location: 133 E 80th St, Manhattan, New York, US
- Coordinates: 40°46′33″N 73°57′31″W
- Area: less than one acre
- Architectural style: Late Gothic Revival
- NRHP reference No.: 10000553
- NYSRHP No.: 06101.017261

Significant dates
- Added to NRHP: 2010-08-16
- Designated NYSRHP: 2010-06-25

133 East 80th Street is a cooperative apartment building on the Upper East Side of Manhattan, New York City, United States. Designed by Rosario Candela, the 15-story building contains elements of the Tudor Revival and Gothic Revival styles. The exterior is made of limestone and brick, and the interior consists of three ground-level stores, a doctor's office, and 20 residential units. The site was acquired in 1929 and the building opened in October 1930. It was added to the National Register of Historic Places in 2010.

== Description ==
133 East 80th Street is located on the Upper East Side of Manhattan. The site is at 80th Street's northwestern corner with Lexington Avenue, measuring 70 feet (21 m) wide on 80th Street to the south and 100 feet (30 m) wide on Lexington Avenue to the east. The adjacent buildings on Lexington Avenue are mixed-use 12- to 17-story buildings, along with a church immediately to the southeast. Along 80th Street are 5-story residences, including the East 80th Street Houses immediately across the street, along with 49 East 80th Street and other townhouses one block west.

The building was designed by Rosario Candela, a prolific luxury apartment designer in New York City during the mid-1920s, who continued to design buildings after the Wall Street crash of 1929. When 133 East 80th Street was completed, Marcia Davenport of The New Yorker magazine wrote in November 1930 that the building "has a peculiarly simple sort of charm, and therefore has appealed to some delightful people". Davenport conversely wrote that the structure was not architecturally outstanding. Over the years, the building has been overlooked because its address did not readily indicate its location in the Manhattan street grid. This contrasted with other addresses such as 200 West 57th Street or 1 East 72nd Street, whose locations could be easily calculated by the Manhattan address algorithm. The architectural historian Christopher Gray retrospectively wrote that the building was among Candela's "most successful works".

=== Exterior ===
The exterior rises 15 stories and has elements of the Tudor Revival and Gothic Revival styles. It generally has sash windows, and the upper stories contain setbacks. The two-story base is clad in limestone and brick, and is divided into five bays on the 80th Street elevation and six bays on the Lexington Avenue elevation. On 80th Street, there is a Tudor entrance arch made of terracotta, with wood-and-glass doors and metal sconces. The Lexington Avenue facade has three storefronts, each containing windows with anthemion cresting, topped by metal marquees. There are rolldown gates in front of the storefronts, and the northernmost bay has a service entrance with a decorative wrought iron door. A cornice runs above the base.

The rest of the facade has Gothic Revival decorations including gargoyles, masks, crests, a balcony, and an embrasure. The 3rd to 13th stories form the midsection, which have weathered brick laid in common bond. The corners have limestone quoins which reach down to the 2nd floor, and the windows have moldings similar to those above the 80th Street entrance. On the 3rd and 4th stories, the facade is designed like a piano nobile and has brickwork laid in a diaper pattern. The 4th floor has motifs of jester heads, and there is another terracotta cornice running above the 9th floor.

The 12th to 15th stories contain terraces, as well as Gothic arches made of corbel bricks (the arches are absent from the 13th floor). The roof has a water tower enclosure surrounded by a balustrade, along with brick crenellations. The enclosure's decorations include Gothic arches with terracotta medallions, in addition to diaper-patterned walls and brick buttresses. Gray wrote that the pinnacle was "a craggy, romantic top that could double as a mountain castle redoubt in a Harry Potter movie".

=== Interior ===
The interior consists of three ground-level stores, a doctor's office, and 20 residential units (including a penthouse apartment at the top). The ground level has several entry spaces decorated with marble floors and wood moldings, illuminated by sconces. Just inside the entrance is a wainscoted foyer leading to a lobby. In turn, wood-paneled doors lead from the lobby to an elevator hall, as well as to other spaces including a service elevator, mailroom, staircase, and rear areaway.

The 2nd floor is the only story with three apartments. The 3rd to 5th floors have two units each, while the other floors have one apartment each. As originally envisaged, the 6th to 11th floors contained several two-floor duplex apartments. These apartments originally included 6 to 13 rooms each. By the 2000s, the building contained only one duplex: the penthouse on the 14th and 15th floors.

On floors with two apartments, these units' communal rooms (i.e. libraries and living and dining rooms) are at the northeastern and southeastern corners, while residents' bedrooms are at the center of the Lexington Avenue elevation. On floors with one apartment, the communal rooms are on 80th Street and the bedrooms are on Lexington Avenue. The servant spaces on each floor face the western elevation, and there are additional servant spaces on the northern edges of floors with one apartments. The communal rooms and bedrooms have symmetrical openings, plaster walls, wood-paneled doors, and ceilings with coves or cornices. Many kitchens, bathrooms, and servant rooms have been modernized or repurposed over time.

== History ==
=== Development ===
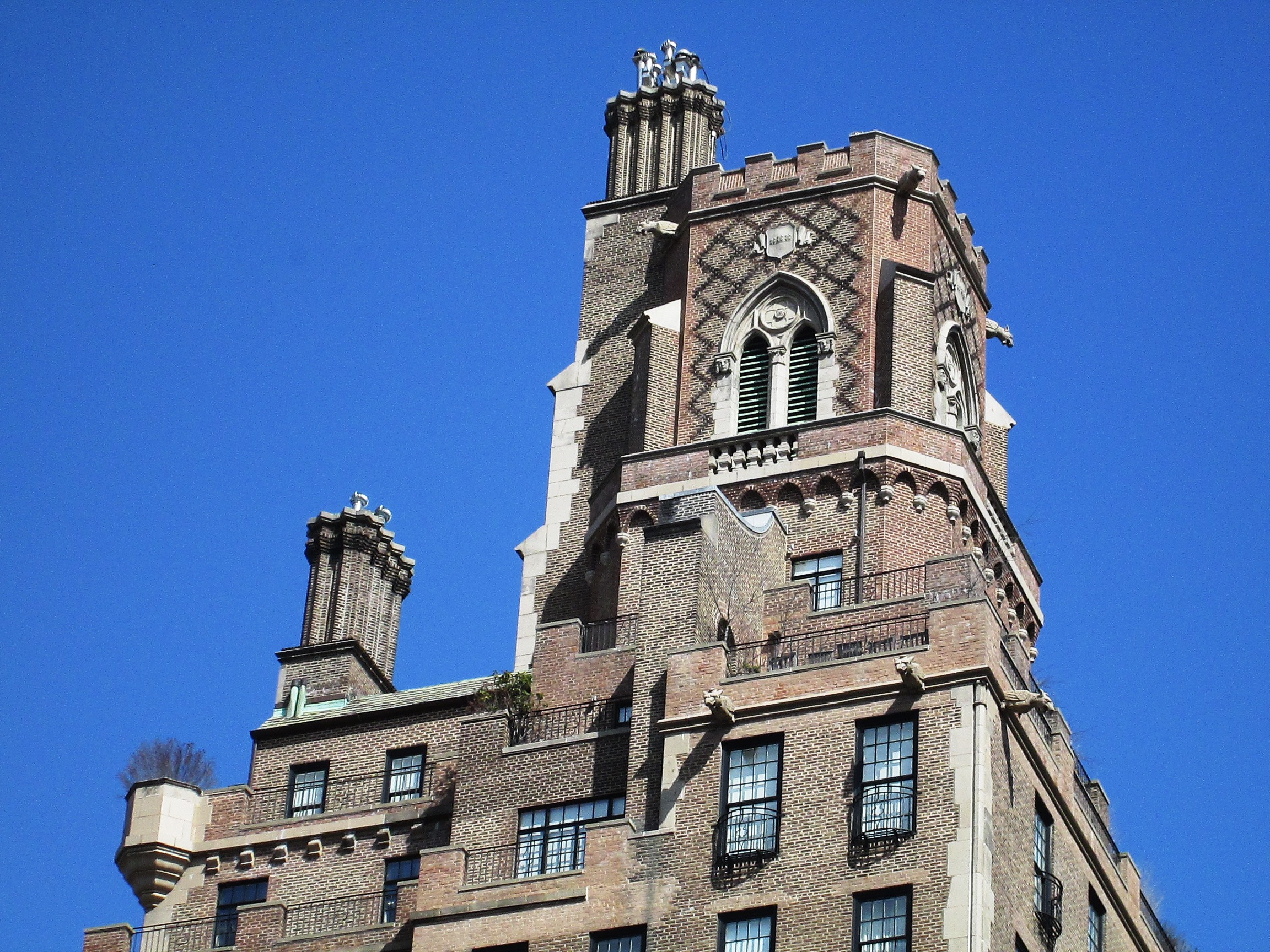
Detail of the top stories

During the early and mid-1920s, Fifth Avenue, on the western edge of the Upper East Side, was developed with luxury cooperative apartment buildings. Similar structures were developed on Madison and Park avenues immediately east of Fifth Avenue, as well as along Central Park West on the Upper West Side. Luxury apartment development was slow to come to Lexington Avenue until the late 1920s, when a lack of available space on Park Avenue led developers to construct buildings on Madison and Lexington avenues. In May 1929, the Calvin Morris Corporation, operated by Moses Ginsberg (who was also developing the nearby Carlyle Hotel), bought three land lots at 131–135 East 80th Street. Ginsberg immediately announced plans to construct a 13-story luxury cooperative for $1.75 million, to be developed by Rosario Candela.

Candela's plans originally called for 14 one-story apartments and 5 two-story apartments, each with 6 to 11 rooms. Excavation for the site began in November 1929, and Brown, Wheelock: Harris, Vought & Company were hired that month to sell the apartments. Within a month, they had reported that the building had attracted "an unusual amount of interest". Construction of the above-ground superstructure took place rapidly, starting on January 4, 1930; by that February, half the apartments had been sold. Residents formed a cooperative called the 133 East 80th Street Corporation, which bought the building from the Calvin Morris Corporation in September 1930, taking a $50,000 mortgage loan from Calvin Morris. The cooperative also assumed responsibility for an existing $800,000 mortgage, the maturity (due) date of which was postponed to 1935.

=== Operation ===
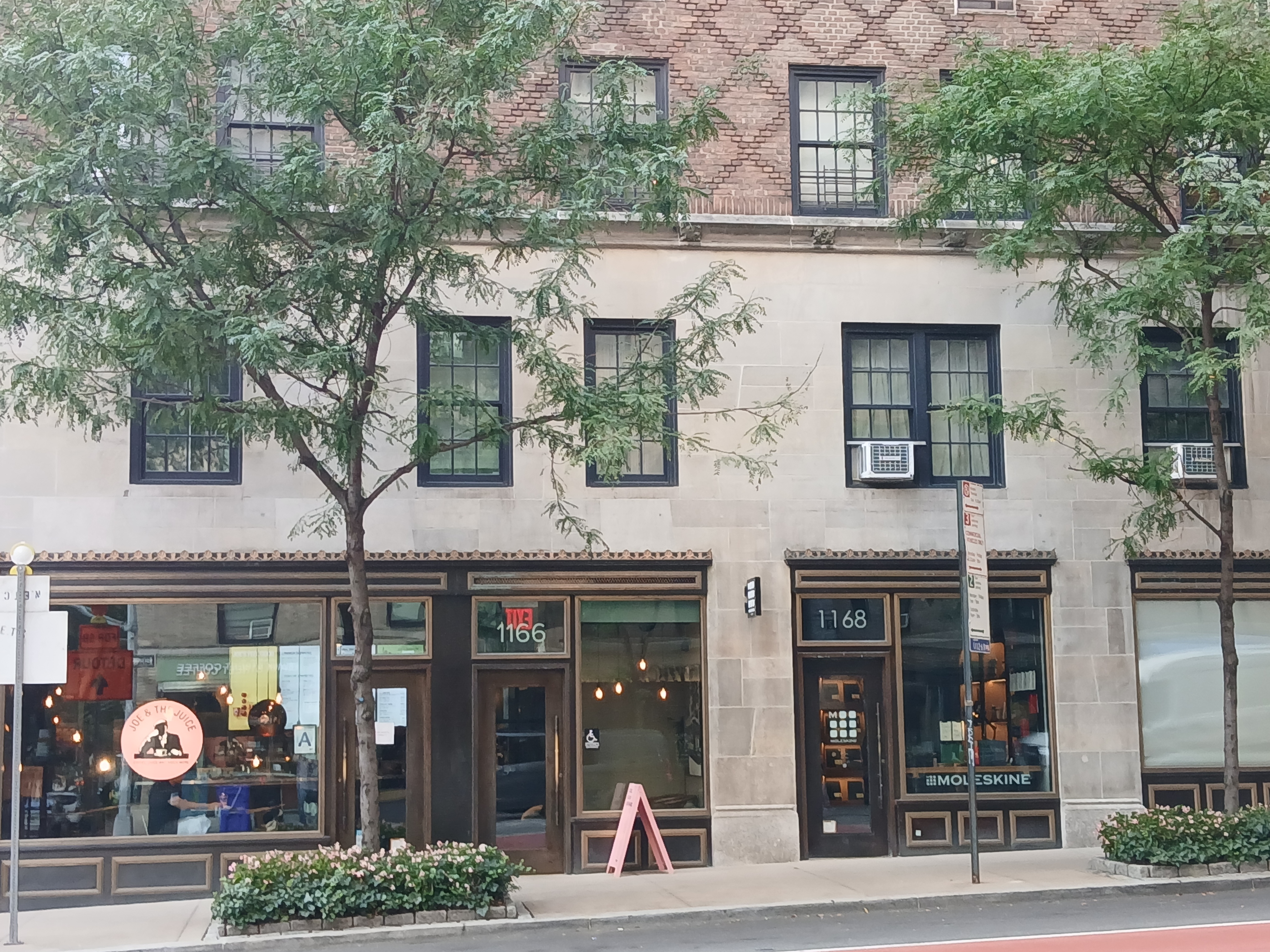
The building as seen from across Lexington Avenue, with stone storefronts on the ground level and a brick facade above

The building was completed on August 19, 1930, and formally opened to residents on October 10 that year. At the time, 60% of the units had been sold. Among the first buyers were the painter Allen Tucker, the neurologist Irving H. Pardee, and the composer Walter Damrosch (who bought two apartments there). Early advertisements for 133 East 80th Street referred to the apartment block and the adjacent buildings as creating "a little corner of New England on East Eightieth Street".

Because of the ongoing Great Depression, there was initially reduced demand for ownership of apartments within the building, leading Brown, Wheelock to rent out some apartments. In the mid-20th century, the building continued to attract many well-off residents who worked in the literary, artistic, business, and legal fields. These residents included the broadcaster Jack R. Howard, the writer Edward Streeter, and the diplomat McGeorge Bundy. The building was still not fully occupied in 1945 when one of the 133 East 70th Street Corporation's shareholders, Henry L. O'Brien, took over the mortgage, thereby becoming the building's landlord. After the city government temporarily banned evictions and rent increases under the Housing Act of 1949, O'Brien sued to invalidate the bans; a judge initially ruled against him, but this was overturned on appeal.

O'Brien held the mortgage until 1966, when the 133 East 70th Street Corporation took over ownership again. The cooperative's shareholders own their apartments and, for the most part, occupy them; some apartment owners rent out their units. In 1969, the cooperative was found guilty of discriminating against a Jewish prospective resident. A fire in 1975 killed three residents and destroyed the duplex spanning the 10th and 11th floors, after that apartment's owners left their fireplace unattended. The building's facade underwent renovation in the mid-2000s. This work involved facade cleaning, reproduction of damaged architectural details, and window replacements. In 2010, the building was added to the National Register of Historic Places.

== See also ==
- National Register of Historic Places listings in Manhattan from 59th to 110th Streets

== Sources ==
- National Register of Historic Places Inventory/Nomination: Building at 133 East 80th Street (PDF) (Report). National Park Service. 2010.
