= Gaylord White Houses =

Public housing development in Manhattan, New York

White Houses
- NYCHA Property
- Gaylord White Houses
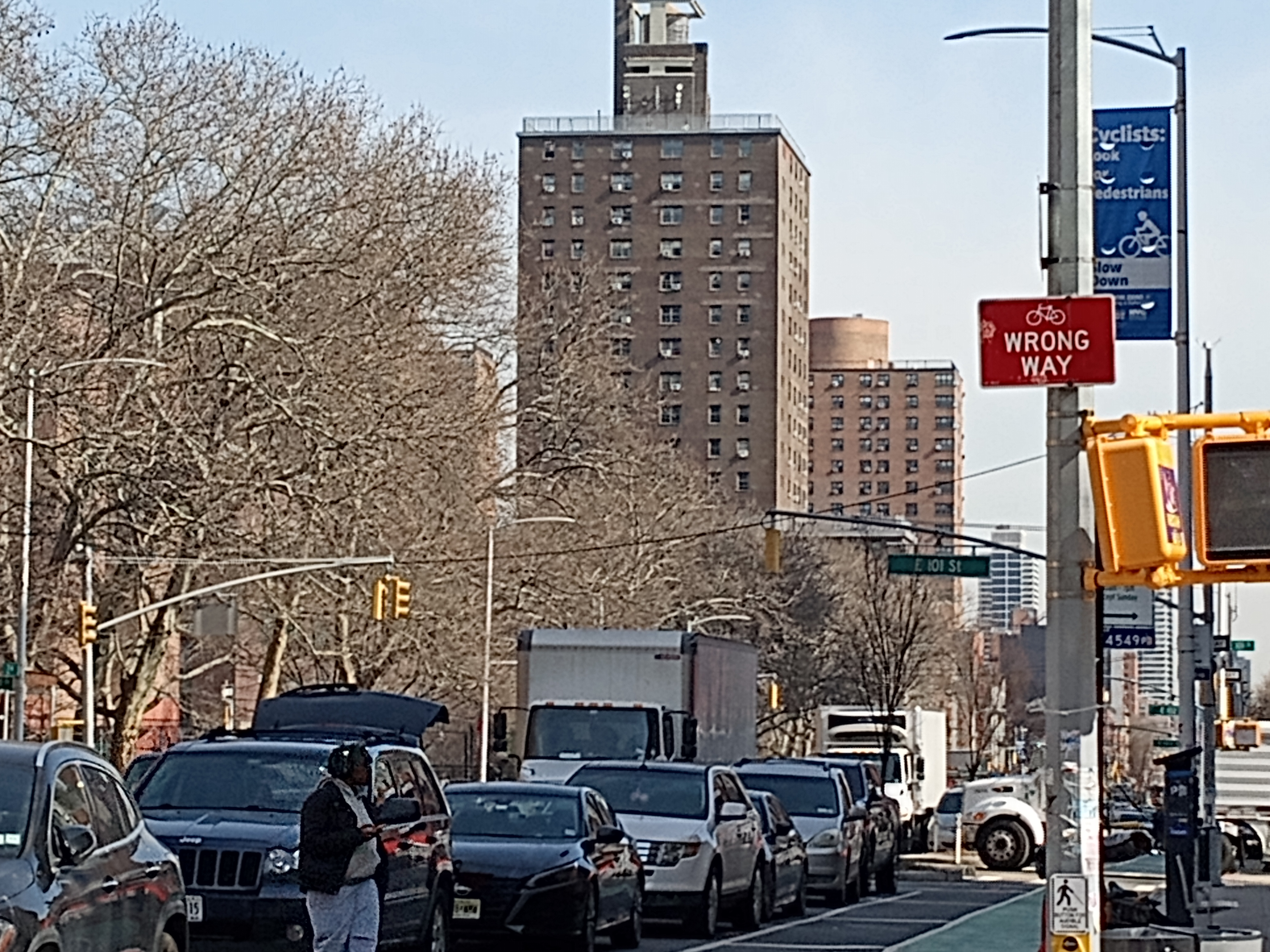
- Interactive map of White Houses
- Country: United States
- State: New York
- City: New York City
- Borough: Manhattan

Area
  - Total: 0.82 acres (0.33 ha)

Population
  - Total: 225
- Zip Code: 10029

U.S. National Register of Historic Places
- Designated: November 27, 2024
- Reference no.: 1100011075

The Gaylord White Houses is a New York City Housing Authority housing building at the corner of East 104th Street and 2nd Avenue in East Harlem, Manhattan. The main structure has 20 stories and the southern rectangle stub in the same building is 8 stories. It is connected to a reconstructed 3-story Union Center Community Center at 237 East 104th Street from 1964 to the present.

== History ==
Plans for the public housing project were first announced in July 1957. The housing complex was designed by architect Albert Mayer; plans for the new building were filed with the Department of Buildings in October 1960. The project was named after Gaylord Starin White, a Presbyterian minister and the second headworker (director) of the Union Settlement Association. Groundbreaking ceremonies for the Gaylord White Houses, which was the first public housing development in New York for the elderly, where held on January 24, 1962, and attended by Mayor Robert F. Wagner Jr. This building was completed in September 1964.

=== 21st century ===
The Renovations in Permanent Affordability Commitment Together (PACT) selections started in fall 2025 to replace for more than $209M in repairs, window replacements, roof and facade changes, modernizing water systems, and community center upgrades that will end 3 years later along with the Metro North Plaza Houses by Wavercrest.

The building was listed on the National Register of Historic Places on November 27, 2024.

== See also ==
- New York City Housing Authority
- National Register of Historic Places listings in Manhattan from 59th to 110th Streets
