= Union Settlement =

American social-service agency in New York City

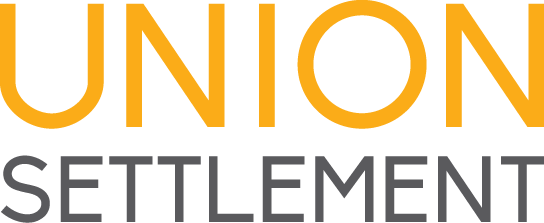

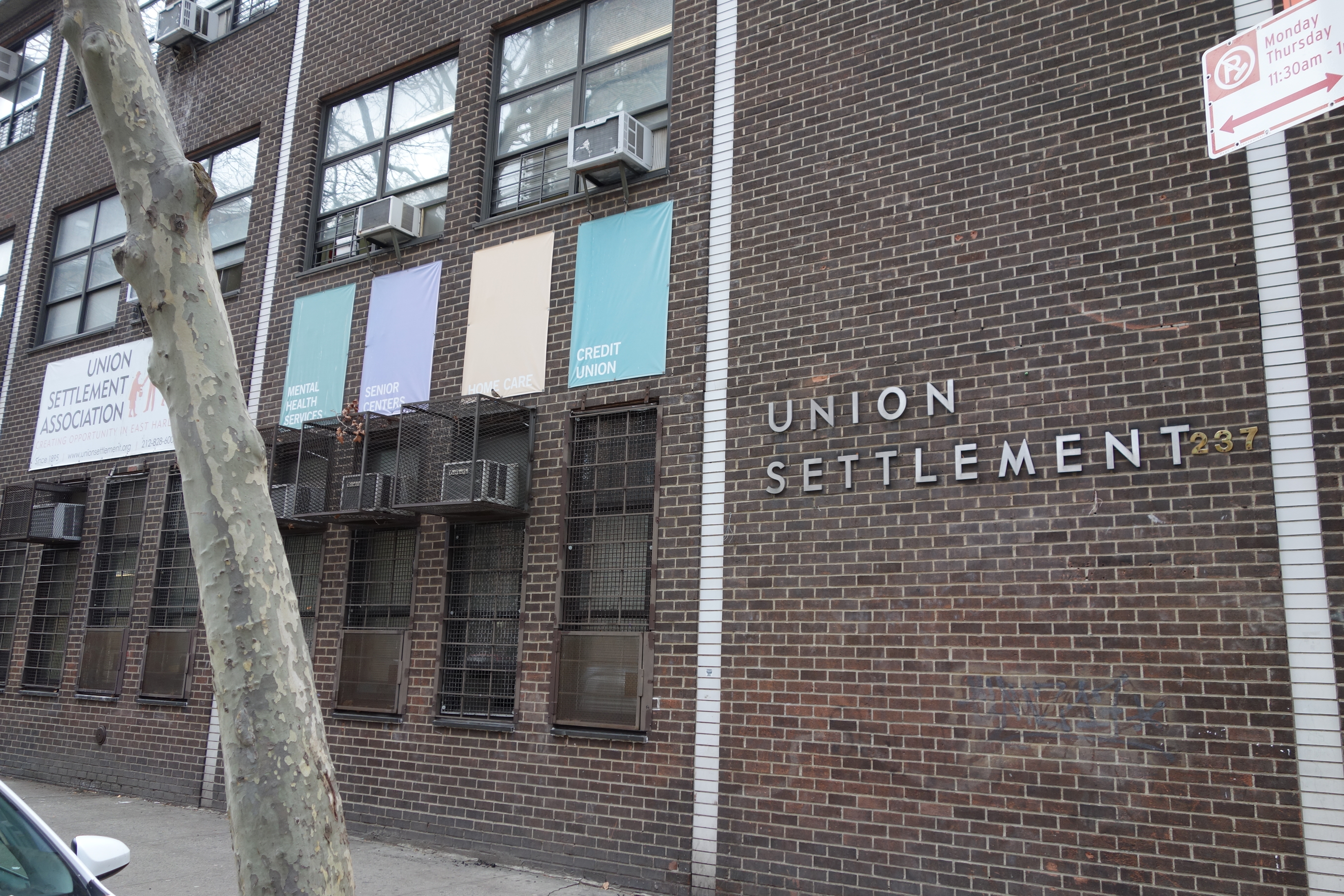
- The Gaylord White Community Center of Union Settlement (2015)
- Formation: 1895; 131 years ago
- Purpose: Social services and reform
- Location: 237 East 104th Street, New York, New York
- Coordinates: 40°47′24″N 73°56′39″W
- Services: Early childhood education, youth development, senior services, job training, arts programs, adult education, counseling, community development
- President and CEO: Rev. Dr. Darlene Williams
- Affiliations: Union Theological Seminary
- Website: https://unionsettlement.org/

Union Settlement is one of the oldest settlement houses in New York City, providing community-based services and programs that support the immigrant and low-income residents of East Harlem since 1895. It is East Harlem's largest social service agency and serves 15,000 people annually through programs including early childhood education, youth services, senior services, adult education, mental health, small business development and community outreach.

== Establishment ==
Union Settlement was founded in 1895 by members of the Union Theological Seminary Alumni Club. After visiting Toynbee Hall in London, and inspired by the example of Hull House in Chicago, the alumni decided to create a settlement house in the area of Manhattan enclosed on the north and south by East 96th and 110th Streets and on the east and west by the East River and Central Park. Known as East Harlem, it was a neighborhood filled with new tenements but devoid of any civic services. The ethos of the settlement house movement called for its workers to “settle” in such neighborhoods in order to learn first-hand the problems of the residents. "It seemed to us that, as early settlers, we had a chance to grow up with the community and affect its development," wrote William Adams Brown, Theology Professor, Union Theological Society (1892–1930) and president, Union Settlement Association (1915–1919). The long service record of his wife, Helen Gilman Noyes Brown, a social worker for years at the Union Settlement, was recognized in 1919 when she was elected to membership in the National Institute of Social Sciences.

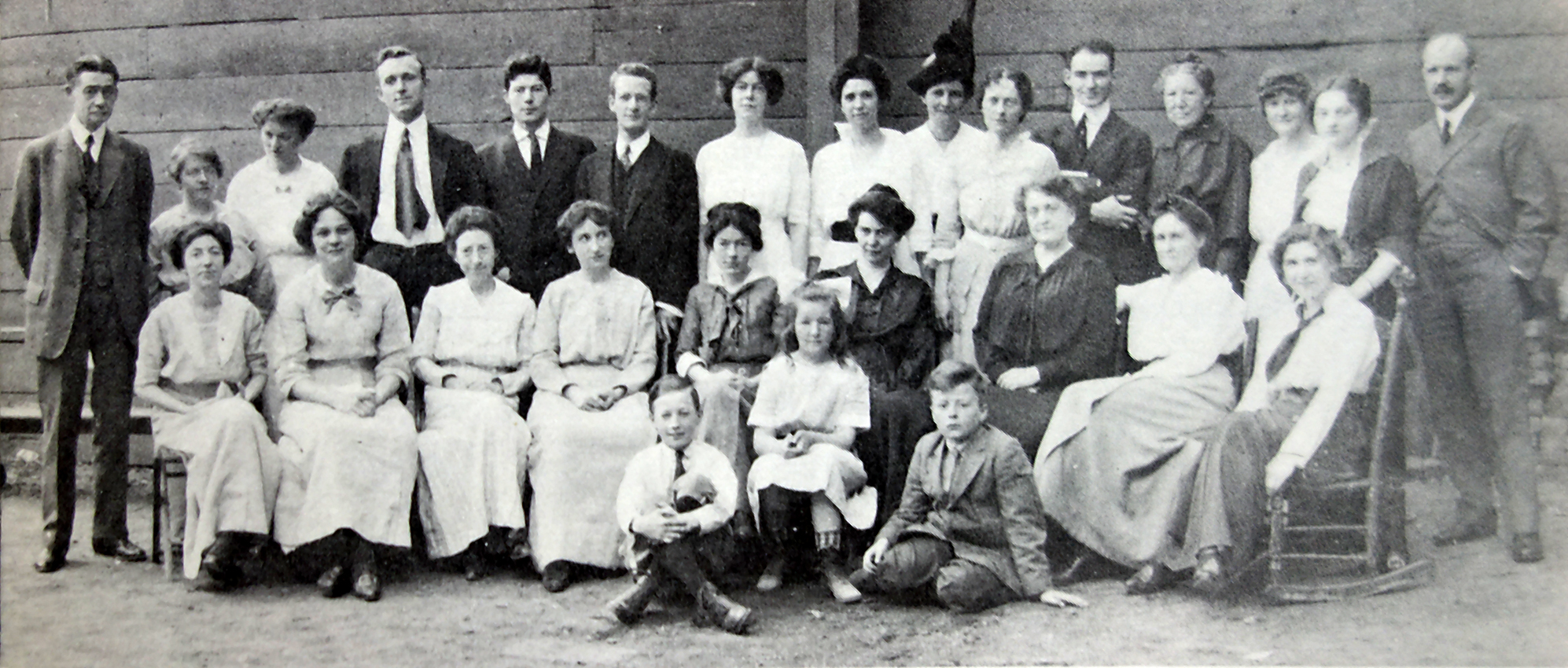
Headworker Gaylord Starin White (far left) and Union Settlement staff, 1912.

With millions of immigrants arriving in the Union States in the late 19th century as the two elevated subway lines were completed, East Harlem quickly equaled the Lower East Side as Manhattan's predominantly immigrant community. Until the 1920s, it was New York's true "Little Italy," claiming the largest population of Italians outside of Italy. The neighborhood had a progressive, reformist commitment: Mayor Fiorello LaGuardia lived in East Harlem, spoke often at Union Settlement, and personified the political activism of the area.

Union Settlement's work has helped tens of thousands of children, youth, and adults, many of whom have gone on to become leaders in the community and beyond, including New York secretary of state Lorraine Cortes-Vazquez and City Council Member Robert Jackson. Hollywood movie star Burt Lancaster played sports, acted in theater productions, and learned circus arts at Union Settlement as a boy. He credited Union Settlement for "saving him from the streets," and supported the organization all his life.

== History ==
In 1895 Union Settlement opened at 202 E. 96th Street, on the second floor of a tenement building. Union Theological Seminary student William E. McCord was appointed its first "headworker" (as its directors were known). It moved twice in 1895 (210 E. 104th Street and 237 E. 104th Street). Several, years later, in 1899 Morris K. Jesup purchased five houses (235-243 E. 104th Street) for the Settlement. McCord's term as headworker ended in 1901 following his resignation, and Gaylord S. White replaced him, eventually serving in that position for 22 years. In 1917, Union Settlement established three campgrounds in Palisades Interstate Park: Camp Nathan Hale for boys, Camp Gaylord White for girls and Camp Ellen Marvin for mothers and young children. The camps exposed tens of thousands of inner-city youngsters, from 1917 to the 1960s, to the natural world. The New York Committee of the American Birth Control League opened a Birth Control Clinic at Union Settlement in 1932. The clinic is one of the earliest in the city and in East Harlem.

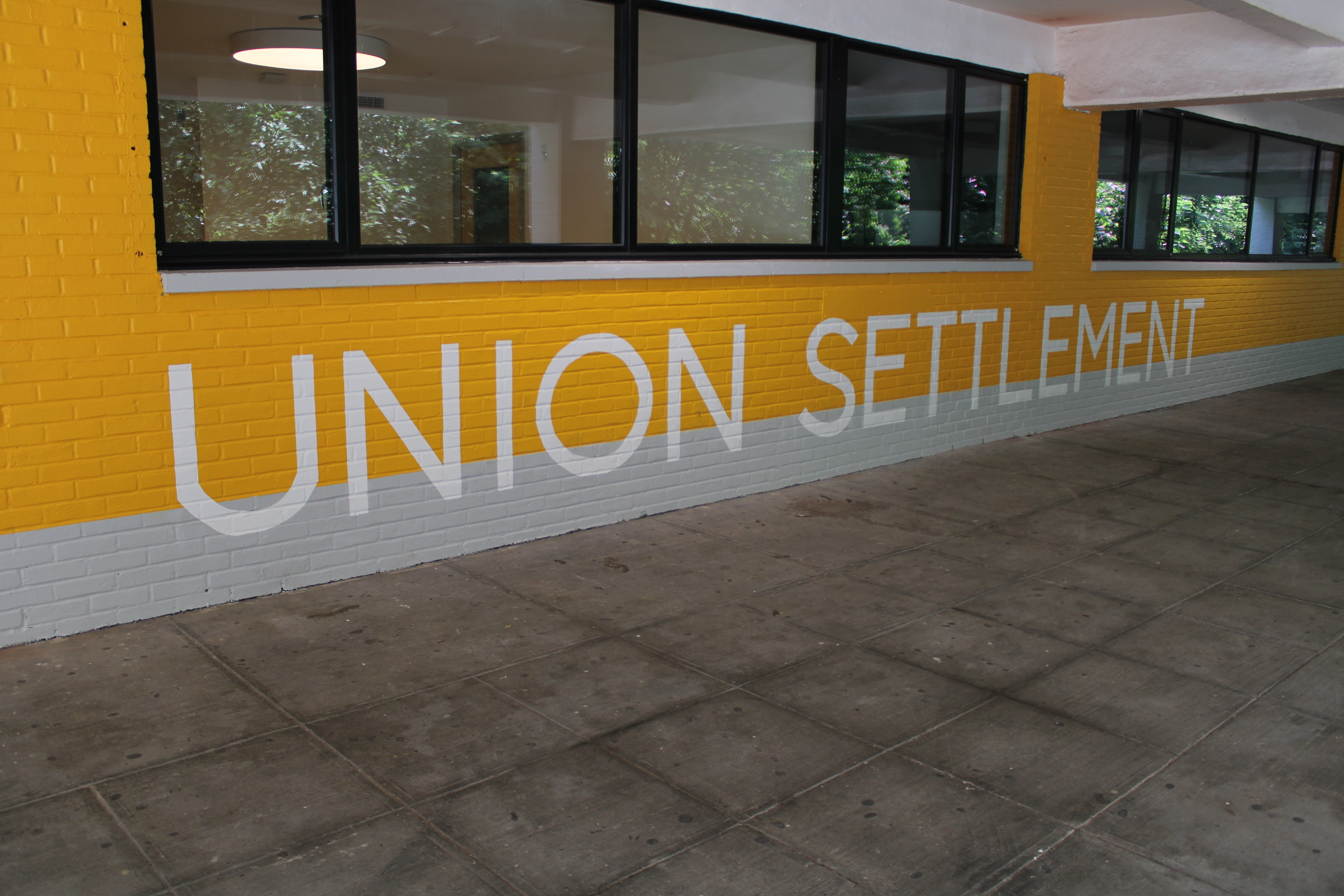
Union Settlement at the Union Washington Community Center, 2021

During the mid-20th century, Union Settlement services began evolving with the needs of East Harlem. 1957, Union Settlement Federal Credit Union opened its doors for business. The credit union is a financial cooperative where members pool their assets and lend money to each other at low-interest rates. Several years later, in 1961, a $1 million grant from the Astor Foundation enabled Union Settlement and six other settlement houses to implement the Pre-Teen Delinquency Prevention Project. In 1965, Union Settlement became the site of one of the country's first Head Start Programs, the federally sponsored preschool initiative launched as one of the Great Society undertakings.

With more recent history, Settlement Health and Medical Services, part of a 1974 federal initiative, provided primary health care to East Harlem residents in a free-standing clinic. The program is separately incorporated in 1976. In 1992, Union Settlement was selected to serve as the lead agency of the East Harlem HIV Care Network, a coalition of over 100 social and health service agencies that address issues of AIDS. Network members serve people who are HIV positive or are living with HIV/AIDS, and their relatives and partners

Union Settlement celebrated its 125th year in operation in 2020. In wake of the COVID-19 pandemic, Union Settlement helped provide vaccination services to many East Harlem residents.

In June 2023, Union Settlement appointed Rev. Dr. Darlene Williams as the first person of color to serve as president and chief executive officer of Union Settlement.

Union Settlement celebrates its 130th anniversary in 2025/

== Programs ==
Union Settlement provides a variety of community and individual services to the community in East Harlem, including:

- Family Child Care Network: Home-Based Early Child Care & Education services to families with children agas six weeks to three years old
- Early Childhood Education Services: Six childcare/Head Start Center-Based Early Childhood Education Programs, serving one-sixth of all childcare services in East Harlem. Comprehensive program curriculum, social emotional wellness, health, asthma, parent/child centered
- Youth Development & Opportunity Services: After-school and summer programs, computer classes, tutoring, sexual literacy instruction, college readiness program, dance, theater, healthy living, counseling, workforce development (includes Rising Stars Program and Bridges)
- Adult Education: Basic education in Spanish and English, English for Speakers of Other Languages, civics, GED preparation, citizenship and computer classes, Writing Through Reading Program, home health aide training program
- Older Adult/Senior Services: Five senior centers, One Naturally Occurring Retirement Community (NORAC) Meals on Wheels, senior volunteer program, transportation program, senior fitness program, recreational activities
- Mental Health & Comprehensive Wellness: individual, group and family counseling and psychotherapy, crisis intervention, school-based mental health services clinics, early childhood mental health services
- Economic Development/Small business development: business education, technology training and technical assistance for entrepreneurs and small business owners, as well as access to capital and additional resources/information
- Community Engagement/Volunteerism/Outreach: annual street fair, cultural celebrations, garden activities, free tax preparation
- NYC Benefits Program: Connecting eligible Harlem community members to NYC Benefits and assist Programs including healthcare, food assistance, housing and more
- Family Enrichment Center (FEC) - Collaborative offerings that build community and personal connections, help members achieve their goals, that create a safe space, and provide additional support where it is needed
- East Harlem Community Partnership (EHCC): Building partnerships with East Harlem organizations and residents to promote family well-being
- Child Care Connection (C4): Connecting over 2,000 parents to subsidized child care services in New York City

== Notable board members ==
- Reginald Auchincloss (1916–1921), member of prominent Auchincloss family.
- Kate Buford (1999–Present), American author and biographer.
- Henry Sloane Coffin (1941–1954), former president of the Union Theological Seminary.
- Lorraine Cortés-Vázquez (Advisory Council), former secretary of state of New York.
- William Adams Delano (1898–1914), American architect and partner in Delano & Aldrich.
- Cleveland Hoadley Dodge (1898–1902), businessman, investor, and philanthropist.
- Edward Harkness (1902–1921), prominent philanthropist of the Commonwealth Fund and heir to the Standard Oil fortune.
- Robert A. Jaffray (1898–1924), missionary to China, Indonesia and several other countries, with the Christian & Missionary Alliance.
- Henry Harris Jessup (1898–1906), Presbyterian missionary.
- Ulric Haynes (1976), diplomat, lawyer and university professor. US Ambassador to Algeria.
- George A. Hirsch (1973–1980), magazine publisher, a founder of the New York City Marathon, politician and commentator.
- Bevis Longstreth (1963–1973), writer, lawyer, and former commissioner of the United States Securities and Exchange Commission (SEC).
- Walter Lord (1963–2002), lawyer, advertising executive, author, and popular historian.
- Arthur Cushman McGiffert (1920–1926), theologian.
- Stanley Rogers Resor (1956–1980), former secretary of the Army.
- John Eyre Sloane (1923), industrialist.
- Orville Schell (1952–1966), American writer, academic, and activist.
- Cyrus Vance (1952–1977), former secretary of state.
- Harry F. Ward (1919–1924), Methodist minister and first chairman of the ACLU.

== See also ==
- Queens Community House, a similar organization in Queens
- Gaylord White Houses, a public housing complex adjacent to the Gaylord White Community Center of Union Settlement
