= Metro North Plaza =

Public housing development in Manhattan, New York

Metro North Plaza Houses
- NYCHA Property
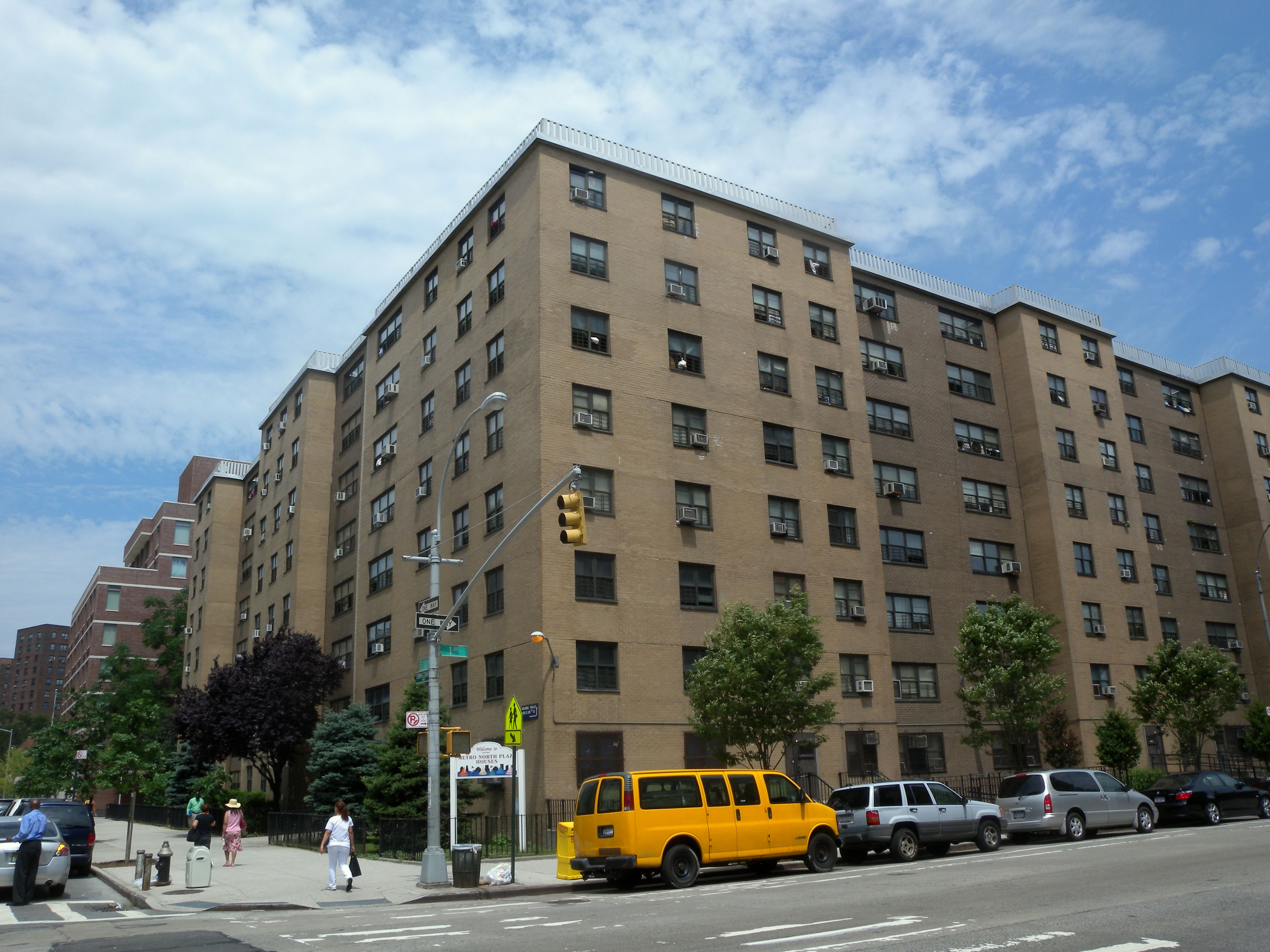
- Interactive map of Metro North Plaza Houses
- Country: United States
- State: New York
- City: New York City
- Borough: Manhattan

Area
  - Total: 2.32 acres (0.94 ha)

Population
  - Total: 534
- Zip Code: 10029

U.S. National Register of Historic Places
- Designated: June 10, 2024
- Reference no.: 100010393

The Metro North Plaza Houses are a public housing project owned by the New York City Housing Authority (NYCHA). The housing complex is located between 1st and 2nd Avenues and East 101st and 102nd Streets in the Spanish Harlem part of the East Harlem neighborhood of Manhattan in New York. It has three buildings. Building I has 7 floors, Building II has 11 floors, and Building III has 8 floors.

== History ==
The three buildings were built in August 1971 by NYCHA and developed in partnership with the Metro North Citizens' Committee. The housing complex was designed by architect William Lescaze and landscape architect M. Paul Friedberg. The buildings were nominated for inclusion on the National Register of Historic Places in March 2024 and were listed on June 10, 2024.

In 2022, NYCHA with the Permanent Affordability Commitment Together (PACT) program delivered more than $275M and are secured of financing, and for Repairs and Upgrades to this and alongside Gaylord White Houses with enhanced social service and the community programs. These renovations began on September 25, 2025 by Wavecrest Management Group and will end in late 2028.

== Notable residents ==
- Marc Anthony, singer

== See also ==
- National Register of Historic Places listings in Manhattan from 59th to 110th Streets
