= Houses at 208–218 East 78th Street =

1860s brick houses in Manhattan, New York

- U.S. National Register of Historic Places
- New York City Landmark
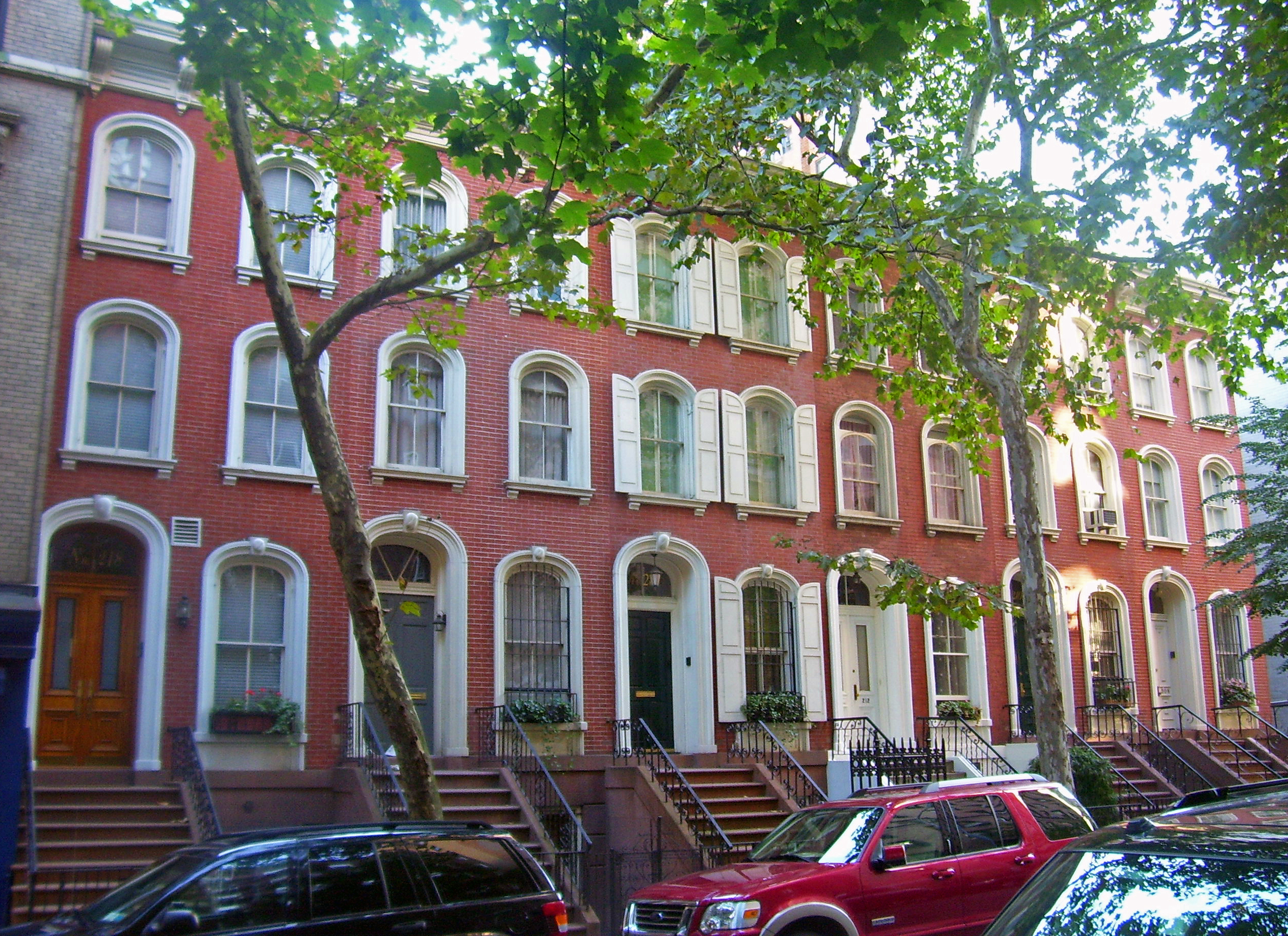
- North elevation, 2008. 208–218 East 78th Street are numbered from right to left.

- Location within New York City Location within New York Location within the United States
- Location: New York, NY
- Coordinates: 40°46′23″N 73°57′26″W
- Built: 1861–65
- Architectural style: Italianate
- NRHP reference No.: 83001732

Significant dates
- Added to NRHP: 1983
- Designated NYCL: May 9, 1978

The houses at 208–218 East 78th Street in Manhattan, New York, United States, are a group of six attached brick rowhouses built during the early 1860s, on the south side of the street between Second and Third Avenues. They are the remnant of 15 built along that street as affordable housing when the Upper East Side was just beginning to be developed.

They are distinctive for the round-arched windows and door openings on their north (front) facades, an unusual trim for houses otherwise firmly in the Italianate architectural style common for urban buildings of that era. They are the second oldest group of buildings on the Upper East Side after the East 78th Street Houses a block to the east, but unlike that row they retain more of their original appearance. In 1978 they were designated New York City landmarks, and in 1983 they were listed on the National Register of Historic Places.

== Buildings ==
The row is on the south side of East 78th, between Second and Third avenues. The block is residential, with many similar, taller rowhouses on both sides of the tree-lined street. The neighborhood is just outside the Upper East Side Historic District, close to the southern edge of Yorkville.

Each house is three stories high and two bays, only 13 feet 4 inches (4.06 m) wide on a raised basement. All are trimmed with carved stone elliptical arched surrounds. The entryways and the adjacent first-story windows have an additional keystone molding. The upper windows also have corbeled sills. The flat rooflines have projecting cornices with vertical brackets. Stoops with iron railings lead to the sidewalk from the entryways, all located on the east bay of the front facades.

There are a few deviations from these standards. The house at 214 has had shutters added, and it and 216 have had some of their original ironwork replaced. At 218, the original brownstone stoop has been replaced with a modern concrete one.

== History ==
The construction of the Third Avenue Railway in 1852 allowed residents of what was then the village of Yorkville to commute to jobs in what is today Midtown and Lower Manhattan. The present area of East 78th Street was still an undeveloped section of Yorkville nine years later, in 1861, when Howard Martin bought 200 feet (61 m) of frontage along the block to build speculative housing.

In accordance with a New York Supreme Court decision a year earlier, Martin paid $128 ($3,499 in 2024) to the city for the opening of 78th Street. He had subdivided it into 15 lots, numbered 206–234 East 78th, and had begun building when he sold the properties to William Brower in 1862. Brower retained the builders, Warren and Ransom Beman and John Buckley, a likely reason for the uniformity of the resulting buildings.

Construction was delayed somewhat by the difficulty of getting materials during the Civil War, but Brower had sold all the houses by the time construction was finished in 1865. Since then, number 206 on the west end of the row and 220–234 on the east have been demolished to build the neighboring, taller apartment buildings.

Other than the alterations noted above, they are as they were when originally built. All five have remained private residences. In 2010 a real estate listing for 208 East 78th gave its rent as $15,775 a month.

== See also ==
- Architecture in New York City
- Houses at 157–165 East 78th Street
- List of New York City Designated Landmarks in Manhattan from 59th to 110th Streets
- National Register of Historic Places listings in Manhattan from 59th to 110th Streets
