= Houses at 157–165 East 78th Street =

1860s brick houses in Manhattan, New York

- East 78th Street Houses
- U.S. National Register of Historic Places
- New York State Register of Historic Places
- New York City Landmark
- South elevation, 2026. 157 East 78th is at the left of the image.

- Location within New York City Location within New York Location within the United States
- Location: New York, NY
- Coordinates: 40°46′27″N 73°57′31″W
- Built: 1861
- Architectural style: Italianate
- NRHP reference No.: 80002685
- NYSRHP No.: 06101.002541 – 06101.002544

Significant dates
- Added to NRHP: March 25, 1980
- Designated NYSRHP: June 23, 1980
- Designated NYCL: April 18, 1968

The houses at 157–165 East 78th Street are a row of five attached brick houses on that street in Manhattan, New York, United States. They are the remainder of an original group of 11 built in 1861, when the area was originally being developed due to the extension of rail transit into it.

As a result, they are among the oldest townhouses on the Upper East Side. Some of them have been added onto, and the two easternmost were combined into a single unit. They retain enough historical integrity that they were designated a New York City Landmark in 1968, and were listed on the National Register of Historic Places in 1980 as the East 78th Street Houses.

== Buildings ==
The row is located at 157–165 East 78th Street, on the north side of the street between Third and Lexington Avenues, being closer to the west end of the city block. The neighborhood is residential, consisting of similar, often larger, rowhouses and apartment buildings. It is just outside the Upper East Side Historic District, and on the southern edge of Yorkville.

Each lot measures 18 feet (5.5 m) wide and 102 feet (31 m) deep, although the buildings themselves only cover the front 40 feet (12 m). They are two stories high, with exposed basements giving them the appearance of three and a main entrance below street level. The westernmost house, 157, has had a slate-shingled mansard roof with three gabled dormer windows added. At the east end, 163 and 165 have been combined into one house, with a penthouse on the roof.

All the houses share some identical decoration, painted white on the western three and black or unpainted on 163–65. A brownstone belt course runs across all five between the basement and first story, unpainted on 163–65. The plain lintels, also brownstone, are similarly decorated. The pressed metal cornice at the roofline is the same on all five, supported by rounded consoles faced in acanthus leaves and decorated with round modillions. It has been painted black on 163–165 and white on the other three, as have the window muntins.

The windows on 157's first story are protected by decorative iron grilles. Its entrance door is glazed rather than painted white. The iron fencing around the terrace is taller than that at 159 next door, and identical to that at 163–65.

== History ==
The opening of the New York and Harlem Railroad, supplemented by horse cars of the Third Avenue Railway after 1852 made what was then the village of Yorkville attractive to developers, as its horse cars brought the suburb within commuting distance of the commercial heart of New York, which was still concentrated below 14th Street. The city was already rapidly expanding northward, and wealthy residents had built many large mansions constructed along Fifth Avenue up to 42nd Street.

In 1860 few of the streets north of 42nd had been graded. But East 78th was opened that year, and a painter named John Turner bought lots 24–28. Since land was getting more expensive, the houses were narrower than their Federal and Greek Revival counterparts built earlier in the century; unlike grander row housing built since the 1840s, they continued to use brick instead of the more expensive brownstone.

Builder Henry Armstrong erected the original row of 11 on the property as speculative housing the next year, 1861. They found willing buyers for whom the lower costs offset the longer commutes. All were finished within that year, making the five survivors the oldest townhouses on the Upper East Side today, beating out this six at 208-218 East 78th, which were part of an original row of 15 started in 1861 but not finished for four years due to material shortages caused by the Civil War.

Later in the 19th century, the mansard roof emblematic of the Second Empire style was added to 157. In 1911 a third story, slightly recessed, was added to the top of 163–65 and the two separate houses were merged. Later in the 20th century the other houses were demolished to clear the way for the larger apartment buildings now on those lots. The original stoops were removed and the former service entrances became the main ones. There have otherwise been no alterations and all five remain private homes.

== See also ==
- Architecture in New York City
- Houses at 208-218 East 78th Street
- List of New York City Designated Landmarks in Manhattan from 59th to 110th Streets
- National Register of Historic Places listings in Manhattan from 59th to 110th Streets
