= East 80th Street Houses =

Historic houses in Manhattan, New York

- U.S. National Register of Historic Places
- New York State Register of Historic Places
- New York City Landmark
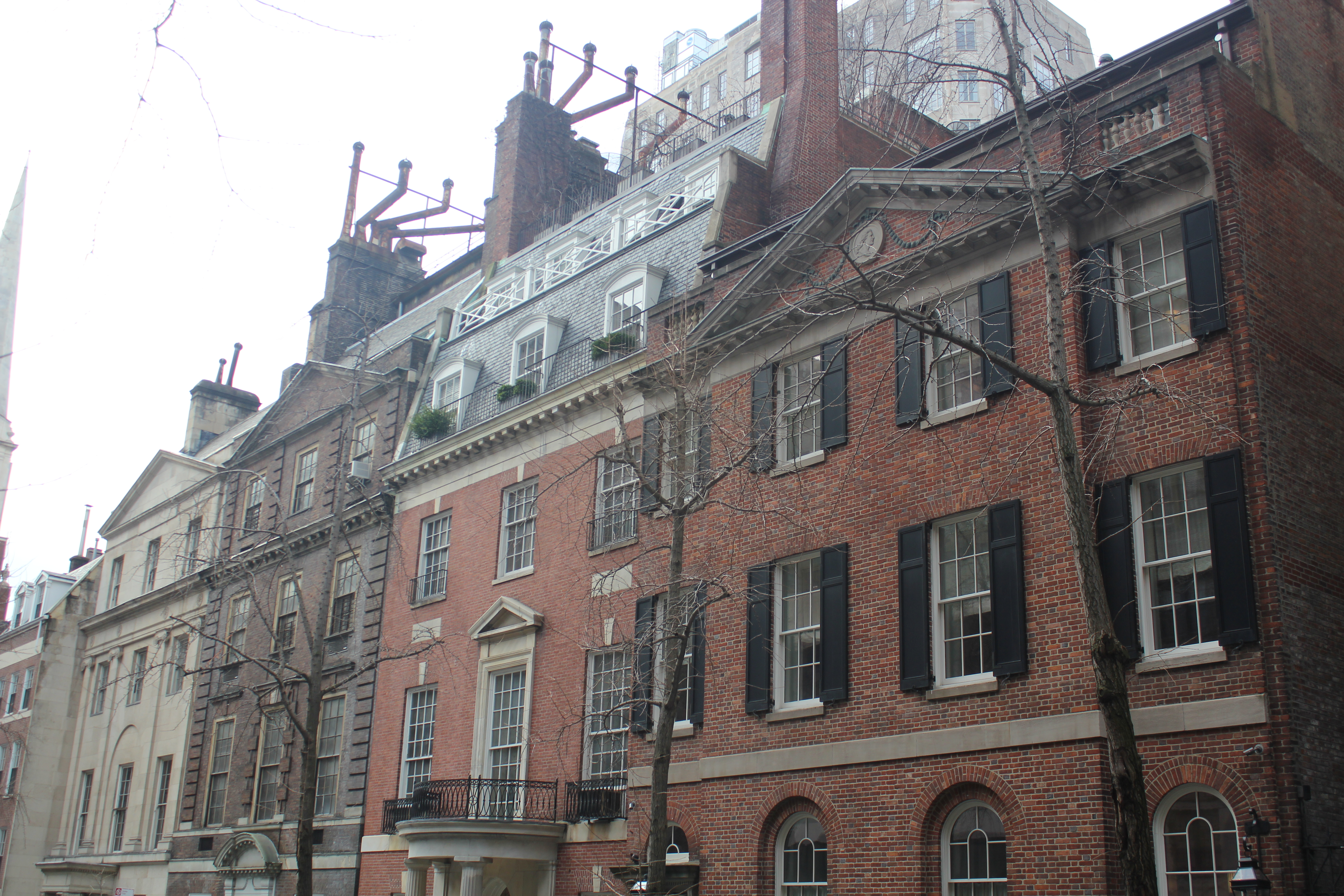
- North elevations of 130 to 116 East 80th Street, 2022
- Location within New York City
- Location: Upper East Side, New York, NY
- Coordinates: 40°46′32″N 73°57′33″W
- Built: 1922–1930
- Architect: Cross and Cross, Mott B. Schmidt
- Architectural style: Colonial Revival
- NRHP reference No.: 80002686
- NYSRHP No.: 06101.000106, 06101.002475, 06101.000104, 06101.002476
- NYCL No.: 0442–0445

Significant dates
- Added to NRHP: March 26, 1980
- Designated NYSRHP: June 23, 1980
- Designated NYCL: 1967–1968

The East 80th Street Houses are a group of four attached rowhouses on that street in the New York City borough of Manhattan. They are built of brick with various stone trims in different versions of the Colonial Revival architectural style.

They were built in the 1920s as homes for wealthy New Yorkers of that era, including Vincent Astor, Clarence Dillon and George Whitney. All were designated city landmarks by 1967, the first group of houses on the Upper East Side so recognized. (Note: The first landmark designations on the Upper East Side, after Gracie Mansion in 1966, were the ones made on January 24, 1967. They included two of the East 80th Street Houses (Morris and Whitney) and the Edward Harkness House at 1 East 75th Street. They were the only three residential properties designated on that date.) In 1980, all four houses were listed on the National Register of Historic Places as intact surviving examples of high-style townhouses for affluent homebuyers of that time period.

== Buildings ==
The four houses are located on the south side of 80th Street between Park Avenue to the west and Lexington Avenue to the east, on land that rises gently from 79th Street to the south. The block has an assortment of similarly sized buildings, most more modern. It is primarily residential with mixed use development on the neighboring avenues. The area is part of the Upper East Side. From west to east, the houses are numbered 116, 120, 124, and 130.

=== 116 East 80th Street ===
Westernmost in the row is 116 East 80th, the Lewis Spencer Morris House. It is a four-story, four-bay building of brick laid in Flemish bond with marble trim topped by a pediment that hides the attic. Continuous belt courses divide the first story from the English basement below and second story above. They are echoed by a continuous stone cornice at the roofline. Festoons and medallions decorate the entablature above. A projecting central section, flanked by entrance bays, features a central entrance where marble surrounds and consoles support an entablature below an arched fanlight.

=== 120 East 80th Street ===
120 East 80th Street, the George Whitney House, is a six-story house also in brick with marble trim. Its most notable feature is a central projecting semicircular marble portico where two fluted Doric columns support an entablature at a string course between the first and second stories. The portico is reinforced by a round-arched main entrance and pedimented second-story window above. The other second story windows have iron railings and splayed brick lintels. Above the third story a cornice with blocks sets off the slate-covered mansard roof, pierced by three dormers with segmental arched roofs on the first of its stories and four on the second, recessed slightly and set off with a wood railing. The top of the mansard roof conceals the sixth story.

=== 124 East 80th Street ===
124 East 80th Street, the Clarence Dillon House, is also a six-story brick building in the Neo-Georgian style. Its front facade culminates in a pediment, which along with the high end chimneys conceals the two top stories. It, too, has a classically detailed entrance, flanked by Ionic pilasters supporting a segmented pediment. Brick quoins accentuate the second and third stories.

=== 130 East 80th Street ===
The easternmost house in the row, the Vincent and Helen Astor House at 130 East 80th, is the only one not of brick. It is a five-story, three-bay Neo-Adamesque building faced in French limestone laid in an ashlar pattern. It shares classical detailing with the two houses to the west. The entrance, two paneled doors surmounted by a fanlight, is sheltered by a small portico supported by Ionic columns. The window above echoes the fanlight with a blind arch, and on either side two-story Ionic pilasters support a full entablature with dentil course and four paterae. Above it a pediment with gently pitched slate roof runs the full width of the house.

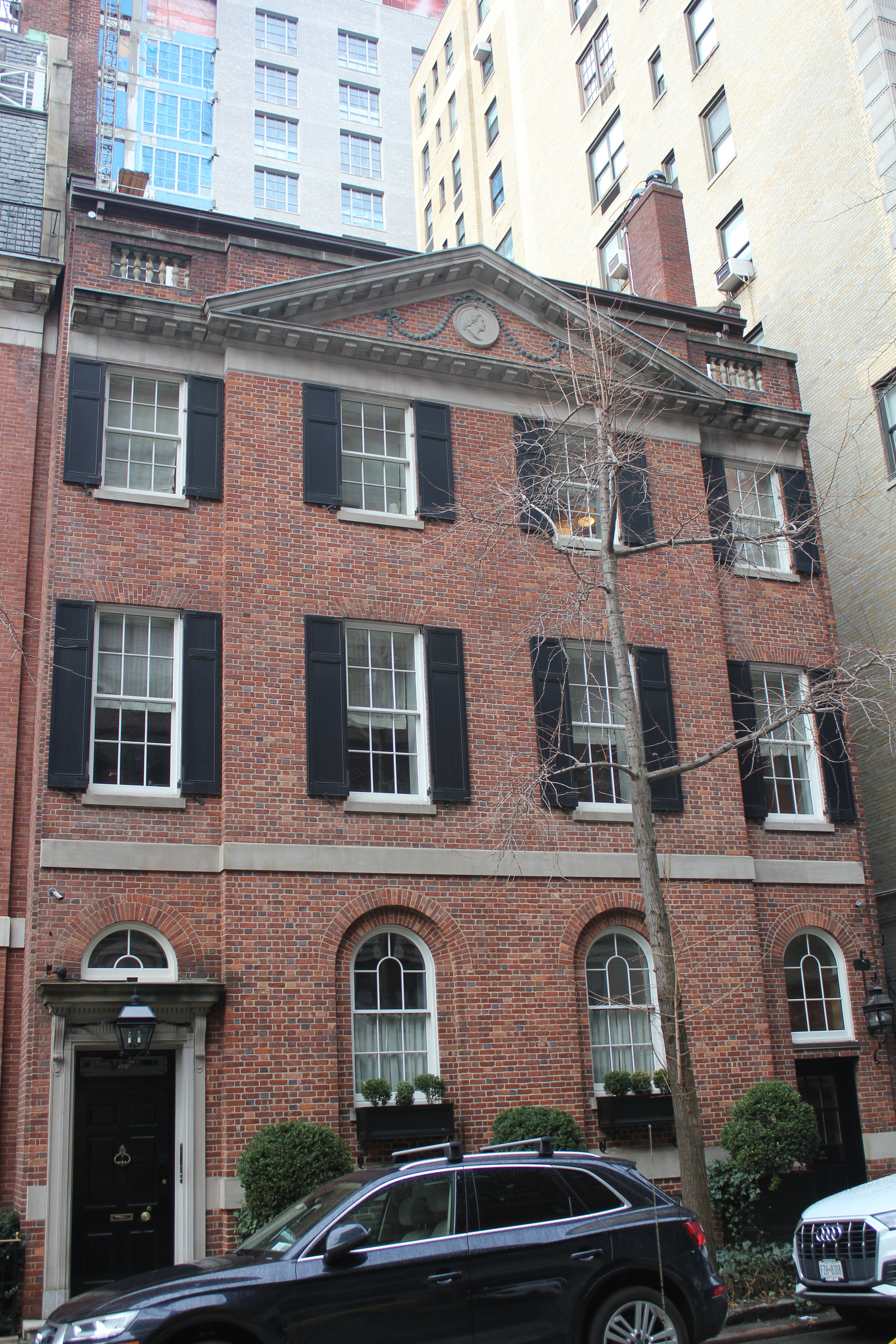
Morris House

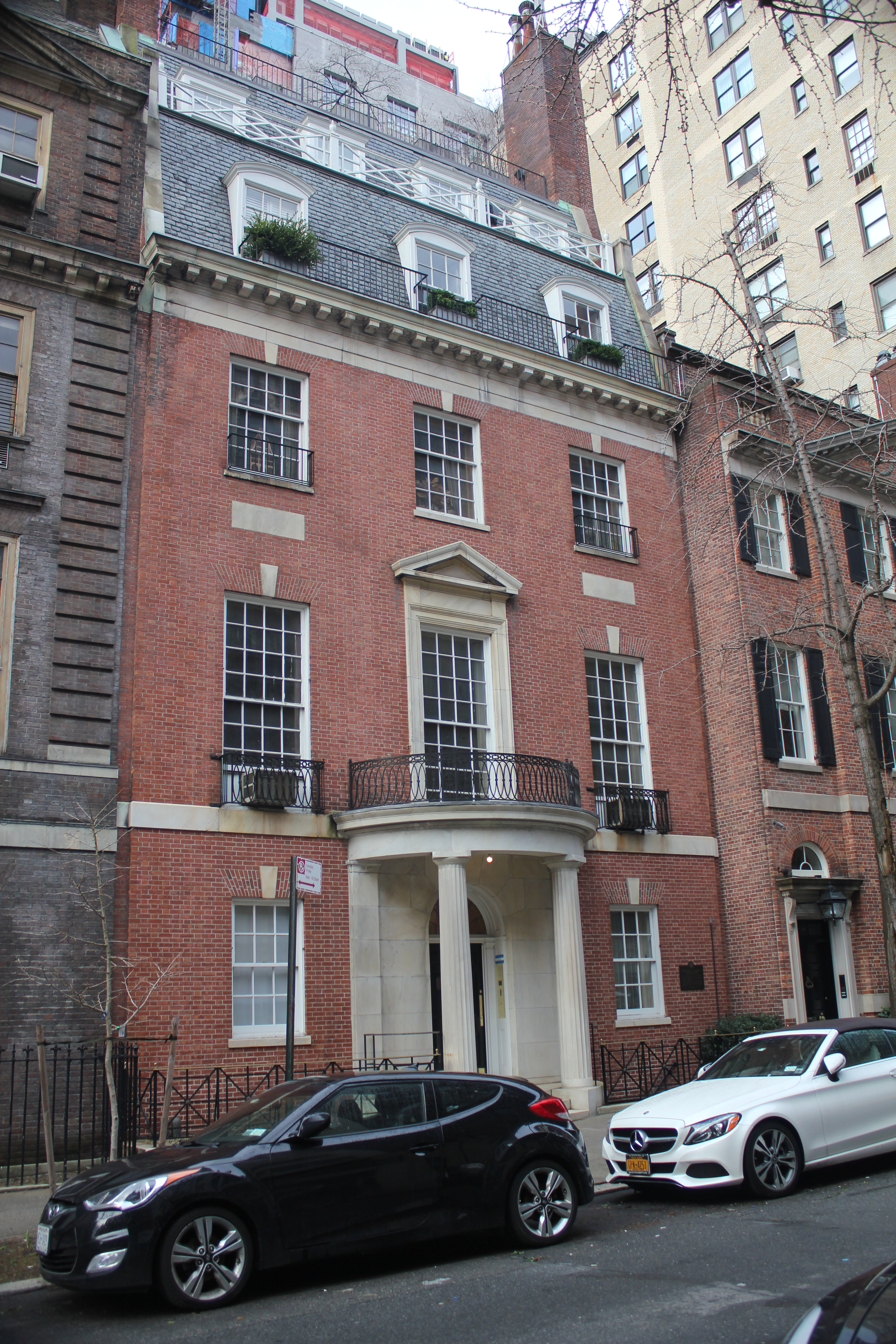
Whitney House

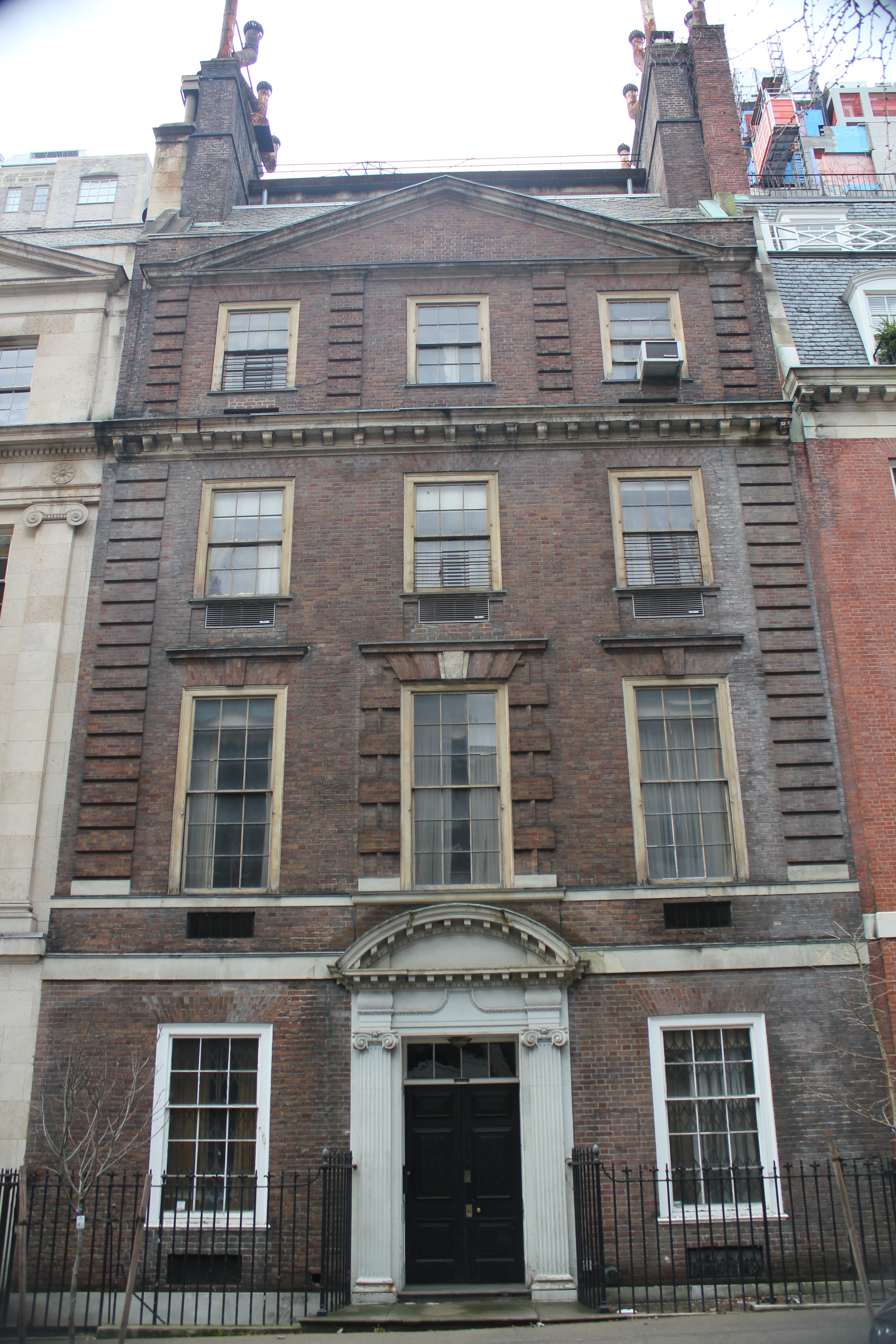
Dillon House

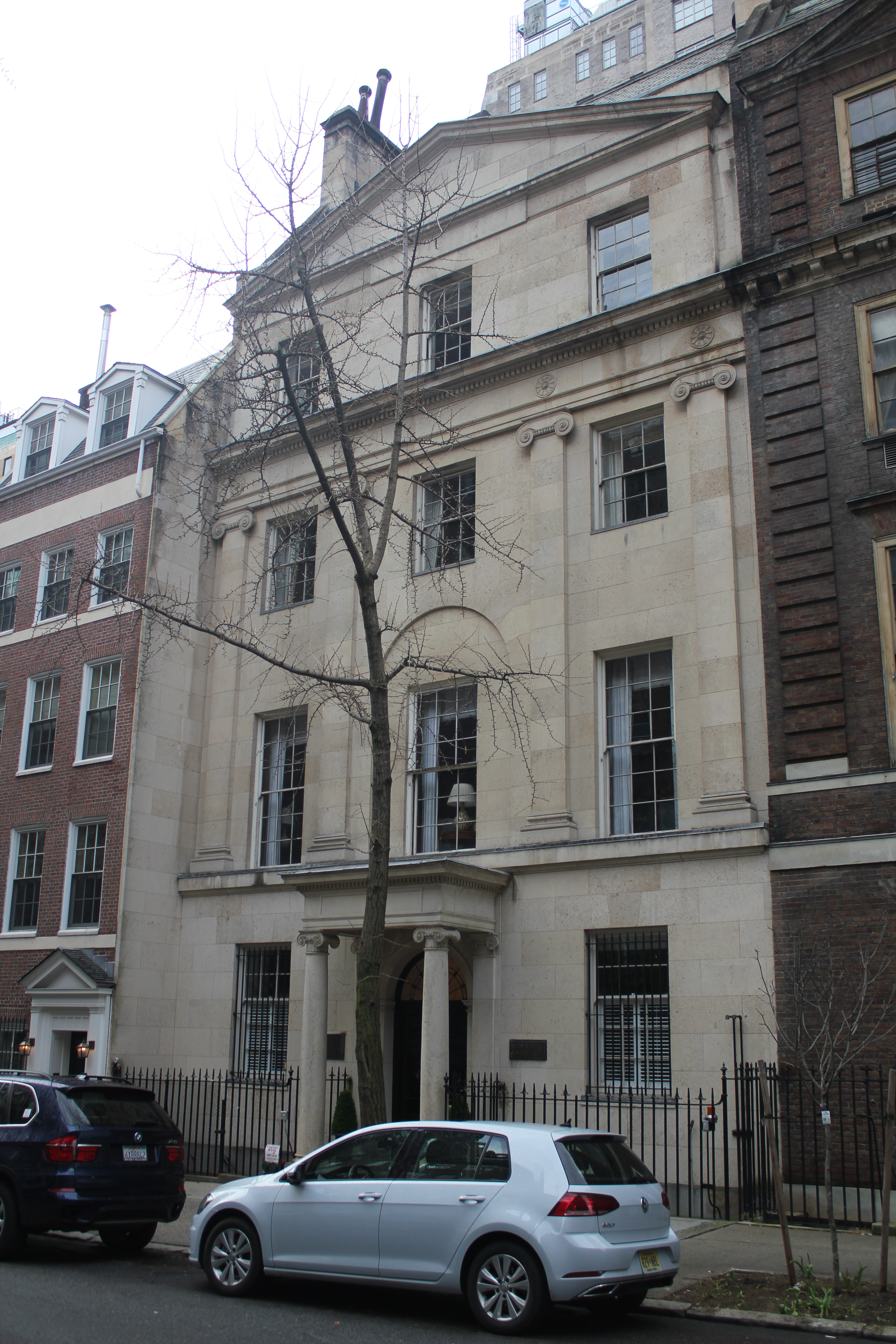
Astor House

== History ==
The block between 79th, 80th, Park and Lexington was first developed in 1870 with a row of 19 three-story brownstones on the north side of 79th, right after the street was built. No other houses were built there until 1907, when two sisters had a double-width Georgian built at 123 East 79th. Eight years later, in 1915, a relative of theirs had a house built at 121 East 79th, which went all the way through to the back of the block. Other grand houses were built on East 79th, but the land behind them on the site of the East 80th Street houses remained undeveloped into the 1920s.

The first of the houses to be built on East 80th Street was 116. The firm of Cross and Cross, known for other designs in New York of the era such as Tiffany's and the Links Club, built the neo-Federal home for Lewis Spencer Morris, a descendant of Lewis Morris, signer of the Declaration of Independence. It was joined in 1927 by Mott B. Schmidt's neo-Adamesque style home for Vincent Astor at 130. Astor also had Schmidt design a matching garage to replace the brownstone at 121 East 79th.

Two years later, the two architects built one more house apiece on the block. Cross and Cross contributed the neo-Georgian building at 120 for George Whitney in 1929, and in 1930 Schmidt put the finishing touch on the block with a similar house for financier Clarence Dillon at 124. During the late 1920s, the four wealthy residents of the East 80th Street houses, who liked the location because the rise in the land complemented by the low houses behind them on the south side of East 79th let the sun into their gardens, bought up the lots behind them on the north side of East 79th. They did this to prevent them from being acquired by developers of new high-rise apartment buildings that would have blocked the sun.

The four houses were among the last built in their styles before the Great Depression changed American ideas about luxury housing. The residents kept the block and their vacant rear lots together until 1942, when they began to sell them off. The Junior League of New York moved into the Astor House later in the decade, and found it so well maintained it did not need a sprinkler system in the yard. The last parcel, the Astors' garage, was sold by Brooke Astor in 1964.

Three years later, in 1967, the Morris and Dillon houses were the first houses on the Upper East Side recognized by the Landmarks Preservation Commission. The Astor House followed three months later. Late in 1968, the Whitney House completed the set.

Other than the Junior League, the houses have largely remained private residential properties. At the time they were listed on the National Register, in 1980, the Dillon House was owned by Iraq for diplomatic purposes. In 2008, the Whitney House was purchased for $3.2 million by a developer who planned to convert it into a six-unit co-op. One unit has been remodeled in Early American style by the residents, who have lived there since 2000.

== See also ==
- List of New York City Designated Landmarks in Manhattan from 59th to 110th Streets
- National Register of Historic Places listings in Manhattan from 59th to 110th Streets
- 133 East 80th Street, immediately across the street to the north
