= Athletics at the 1912 Summer Olympics – Men's 400 metres =

Men's 400 metres at the Games of the V Olympiad
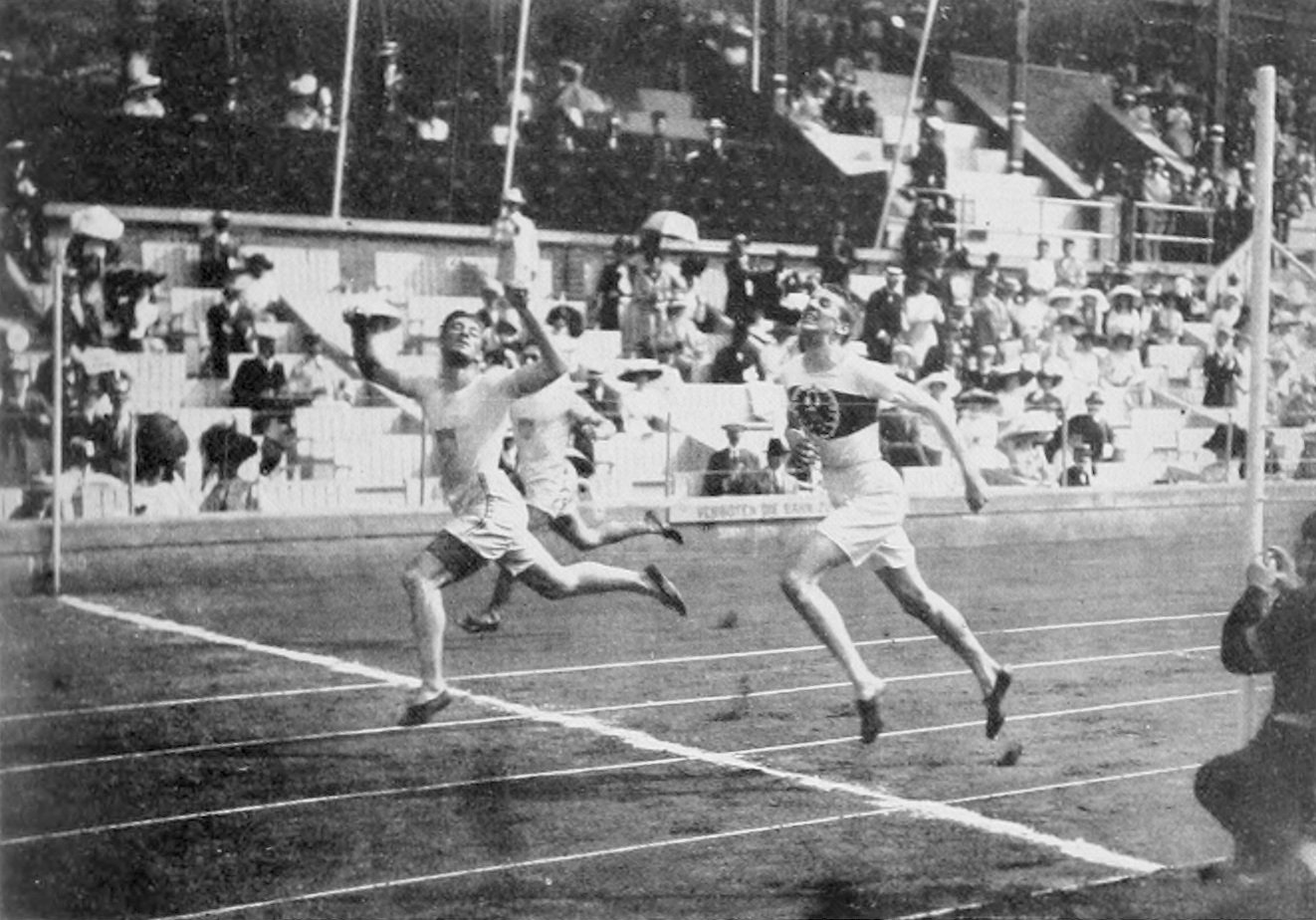
- Reidpath winning gold with Braun in the foreground.
- Venue: Stockholm Olympic Stadium
- Dates: July 12, 1912 (heats, semifinals); July 13, 1912 (final)
- Competitors: 49 from 16 nations
- Winning time: 48.2 WR

Medalists
1st place, gold medalist(s)		Charles Reidpath	United States
2nd place, silver medalist(s)		Hanns Braun	Germany
3rd place, bronze medalist(s)		Edward Lindberg	United States

The men's 400 metres was a track and field athletics event held as part of the Athletics at the 1912 Summer Olympics programme. The competition was held on Friday, July 12, 1912, and on Saturday, July 13, 1912. Forty-nine runners from 16 nations competed. NOCs could enter up to 12 athletes. The event was won by Charles Reidpath of the United States, the nation's fourth title in the event. Hanns Braun of Germany took silver, the nation's first medal in the men's 400 metres.

== Background ==
It was the fifth appearance of the event, which is one of 12 athletics events to have been held at every Summer Olympics. None of the finalists from 1908 returned. The favorites were all among by the American team: 1909 and 1911 AAU champion Edward Lindberg, 1911 IC4A champion Donnell Young, and 1912 IC4A champion Charles Reidpath.

Australasia, Austria, Bohemia, Japan, Portugal, Russia, and South Africa appeared in the event for the first time. The United States made its fifth appearance in the event, the only nation to compete in it at every Olympic Games to that point.

== Competition format ==
The competition consisted of three rounds. The first round had 15 heats, ranging from 1 to 6 runners. The top two runners in each heat advanced to the semifinals. The semifinal was to consist of 5 heats of 6 runners each, but one semifinal had only 5 runners because one preliminary heat had only had 1 runner. Only the top runner in each semifinal heat advanced, making a five-man final. The first two rounds were run without lanes, but an incident in the last semifinal resulted in the final being held with strings demarking lanes.

== Records ==
These were the standing world and Olympic records (in seconds) prior to the 1912 Summer Olympics.

World record	Maxie Long (USA)	47.8(*)	New York, United States	29 September 1900
Olympic record	Wyndham Halswelle (GBR)	48.4(**)	London, United Kingdom	22 July 1908

(*) unofficial 440 yards (= 402.34 m)

(**) This track was 536.45 metres=1/3 mile in circumference.

The Olympic record of 48.4 seconds, set at the previous Olympics, fell in the final. Charles Reidpath broke the record with a 48.2 second performance. Reidpath's time was ratified by the IAAF as the inaugural official world record. Hanns Braun also broke the old Olympic record and Edward Lindberg tied it, en route to silver and bronze medals, respectively.

== Schedule ==
Date	Time	Round
Friday, 12 July 1912	11:00; 16:15	Round 1 Semifinals
Saturday, 13 July 1912	15:00	Final

== Results ==
=== Heats ===
All heats were held on Friday, July 12, 1912.

==== Heat 1 ====
Rank	Athlete	Nation	Time	Notes
1	James Rosenberger	United States	50.4	Q
2	Charles Poulenard	France	50.7	Q
3	Wladyslaw Ponurski	Austria	Unknown	
—	Claude Ross	Australasia	DNF	

==== Heat 2 ====
Rank	Athlete	Nation	Time	Notes
1	Ernest Haley	Great Britain	1:06.6	Q
2	Mel Sheppard	United States	1:06.6	Q

==== Heat 3 ====
Rank	Athlete	Nation	Time	Notes
1	Hanns Braun	Germany	50.6	Q
2	Ted Meredith	United States	Unknown	Q
3	Armando Cortesão	Portugal	Unknown	

==== Heat 4 ====
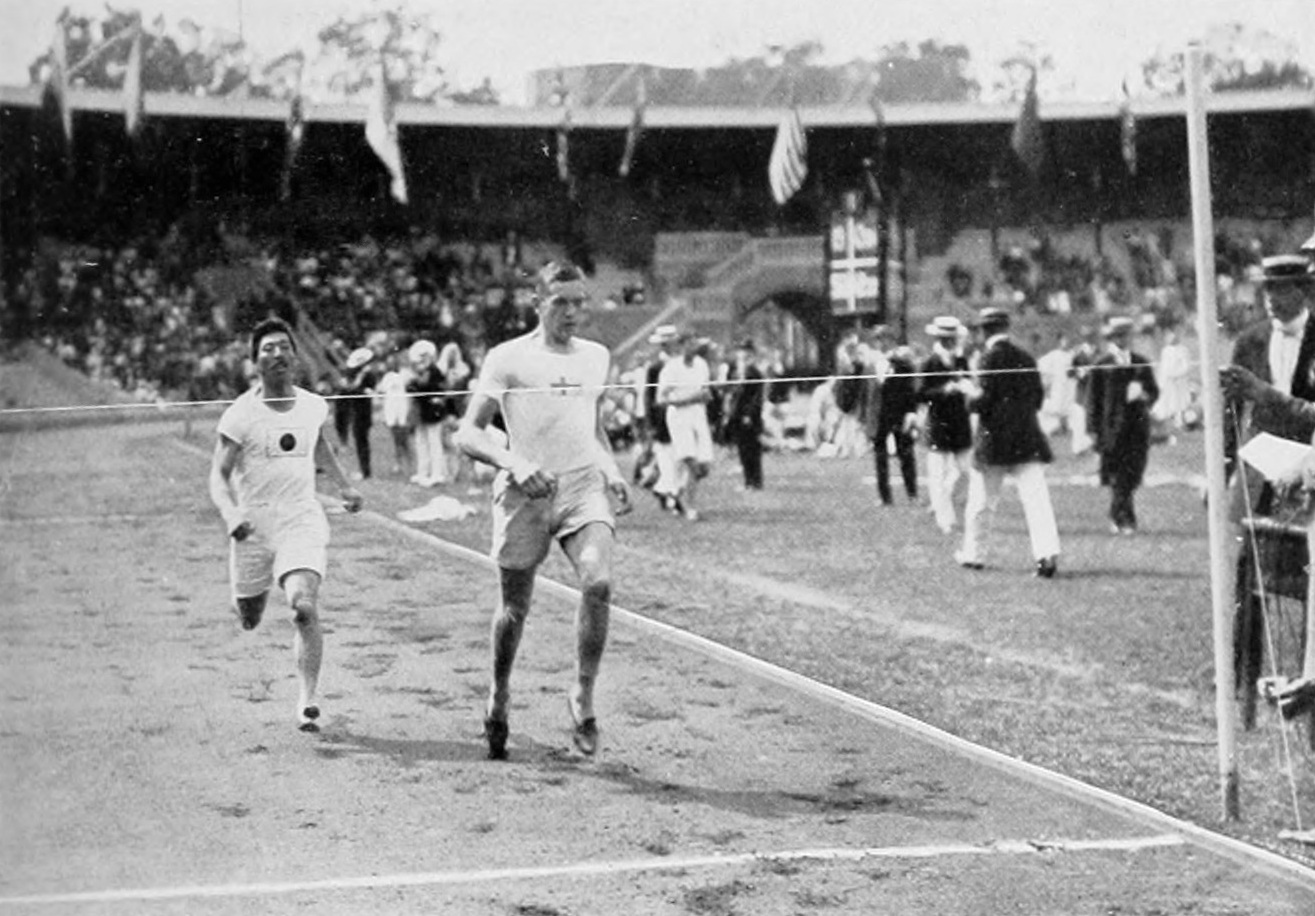
Heat 4:Paul Zerling leads Yahiko Mishima.

Rank	Athlete	Nation	Time	Notes
1	Paul Zerling	Sweden	55.4	Q
2	Yahiko Mishima	Japan	55.5	Q

==== Heat 5 ====
Rank	Athlete	Nation	Time	Notes
1	Charles Lelong	France	50.2	Q
2	Donnell Young	United States	50.4	Q
3	István Déván	Hungary	Unknown	
4	Gustav Möller	Sweden	Unknown	

==== Heat 6 ====
Rank	Athlete	Nation	Time	Notes
1	Knut Stenborg	Sweden	1:01.6	Q

==== Heat 7 ====
Rank	Athlete	Nation	Time	Notes
1	Carroll Haff	United States	50.4	Q
2	Emilio Lunghi	Italy	50.5	Q
3	Max Herrmann	Germany	Unknown	

==== Heat 8 ====
Rank	Athlete	Nation	Time	Notes
1	Frigyes Wiesner	Hungary	50.8	Q
2	John Dahlin	Sweden	51.0	Q
3	Georges Malfait	France	Unknown	

==== Heat 9 ====
Rank	Athlete	Nation	Time	Notes
1	Eric Lindholm	Sweden	51.4	Q
2	Jacob Pedersen	Norway	51.6	Q
3	Heinrich Burkowitz	Germany	51.7	
4	Václav Labík	Bohemia	52.0	

==== Heat 10 ====
Rank	Athlete	Nation	Time	Notes
1	Edward Lindberg	United States	50.6	Q
2	James Soutter	Great Britain	Unknown	Q
3	Franco Giongo	Italy	Unknown	

==== Heat 11 ====
Rank	Athlete	Nation	Time	Notes
1	Clarence Edmundson	United States	50.2	Q
2	Ernest Henley	Great Britain	Unknown	Q
3	Mel Brock	Canada	Unknown	
4	Pyotr Gayevsky	Russia	Unknown	

==== Heat 12 ====
Rank	Athlete	Nation	Time	Notes
1	George Nicol	Great Britain	50.0	Q
2	Ira Davenport	United States	Unknown	Q
3	Thomas Gallon	Canada	Unknown	
4	Erich Lehmann	Germany	Unknown	
5	Georges Rolot	France	Unknown	
6	Ödön Bodor	Hungary	Unknown	

==== Heat 13 ====
Rank	Athlete	Nation	Time	Notes
1	Jacques Person	Germany	55.4	Q
2	Joseph Wells	Great Britain	1:01.2	Q

==== Heat 14 ====
Rank	Athlete	Nation	Time	Notes
1	Cyril Seedhouse	Great Britain	51.5	Q
2	Ervin Szerelemhegyi	Hungary	Unknown	Q
—	Alexander Pedersen	Norway	51.9 DSQ	

==== Heat 15 ====
Rank	Athlete	Nation	Time	Notes
1	George Patching	South Africa	51.1	Q
2	Charles Reidpath	United States	51.2	Q
3	Heinrich Wenseler	Germany	Unknown	
4	Alan Patterson	Great Britain	Unknown	
5	Robert Schurrer	France	Unknown	

=== Semifinals ===
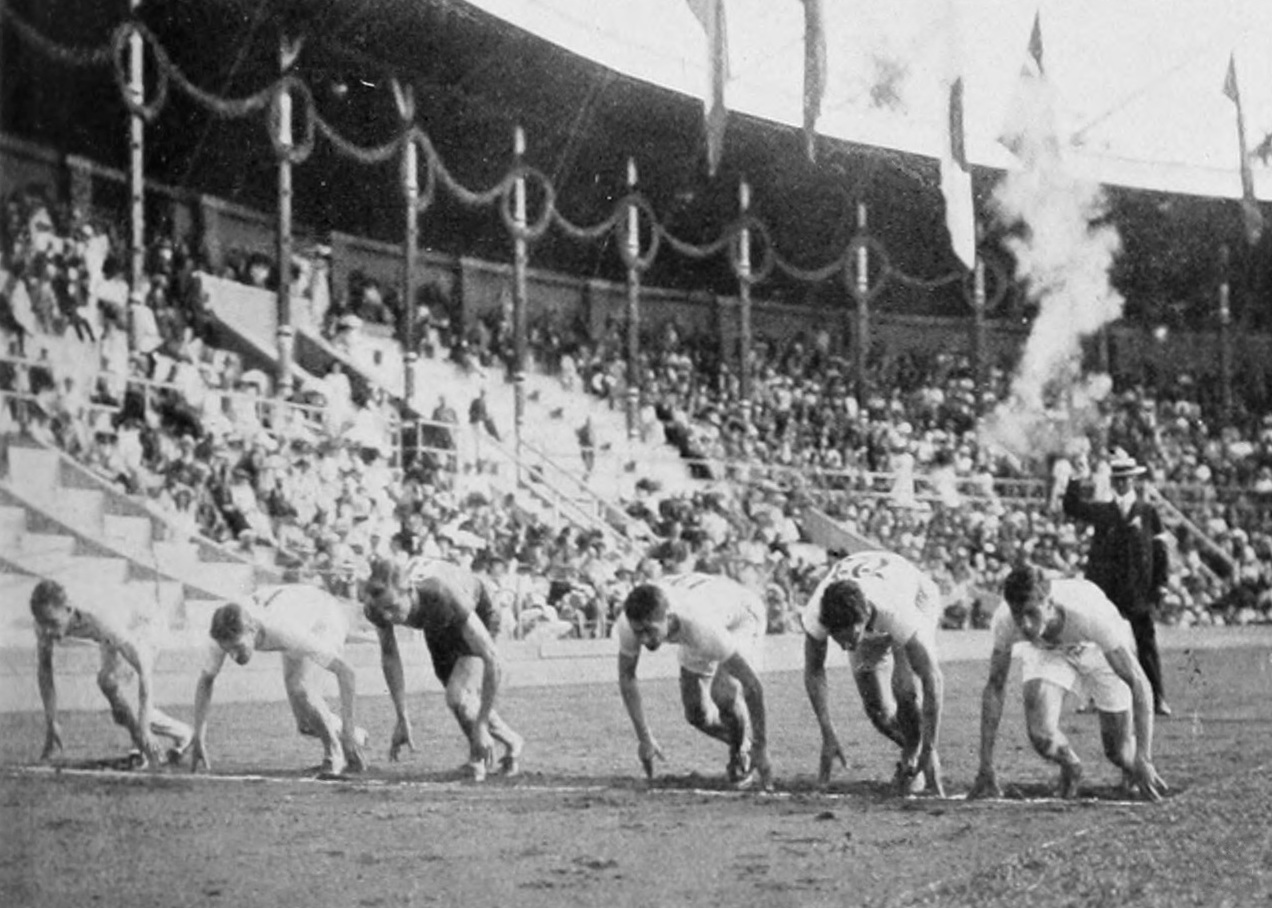
The start of one of the semifinals.

All semi-finals were held on Friday, July 12, 1912.

==== Semifinal 1 ====
Rank	Athlete	Nation	Time	Notes
1	Charles Reidpath	United States	48.7	Q
2	Clarence Edmundson	United States	Unknown	
3	George Nicol	Great Britain	Unknown	
4	Frigyes Wiesner	Hungary	Unknown	
5	Charles Poulenard	France	Unknown	
—	John Dahlin	Sweden	DNS	

==== Semifinal 2 ====
Rank	Athlete	Nation	Time	Notes
1	Edward Lindberg	United States	48.9	Q
2	Eric Lindholm	Sweden	50.2	
3	Charles Lelong	France	Unknown	
—	Jacques Person	Germany	DNF	
—	Cyril Seedhouse	Great Britain	DNF	
—	Joseph Wells	Great Britain	DNF	

==== Semifinal 3 ====
Rank	Athlete	Nation	Time	Notes
1	Ted Meredith	United States	48.8	Q
2	Mel Sheppard	United States	48.9	
3	George Patching	South Africa	50.5	
4	Knut Stenborg	Sweden	50.5	
5	Jacob Pedersen	Norway	Unknown	
6	Ernest Henley	Great Britain	Unknown	

==== Semifinal 4 ====
Rank	Athlete	Nation	Time	Notes
1	Carroll Haff	United States	49.7	Q
2	Emilio Lunghi	Italy	Unknown	
3	Ervin Szerelemhegyi	Hungary	Unknown	
—	Ernest Haley	Great Britain	DNF	
—	James Rosenberger	United States	DNF	
—	Yahiko Mishima	Japan	DNS	

==== Semifinal 5 ====
Young crossed the finish line in first, but was disqualified for elbowing Braun and knocking him to the outside of the track as Braun tried to cut in front of him. This incident resulted in lanes being used for the final the next day.

Rank	Athlete	Nation	Time	Notes
1	Hanns Braun	Germany	49.2	Q
2	Ira Davenport	United States	Unknown	
3	James Soutter	Great Britain	Unknown	
4	Paul Zerling	Sweden	Unknown	
—	Donnell Young	United States	DSQ	

=== Final ===
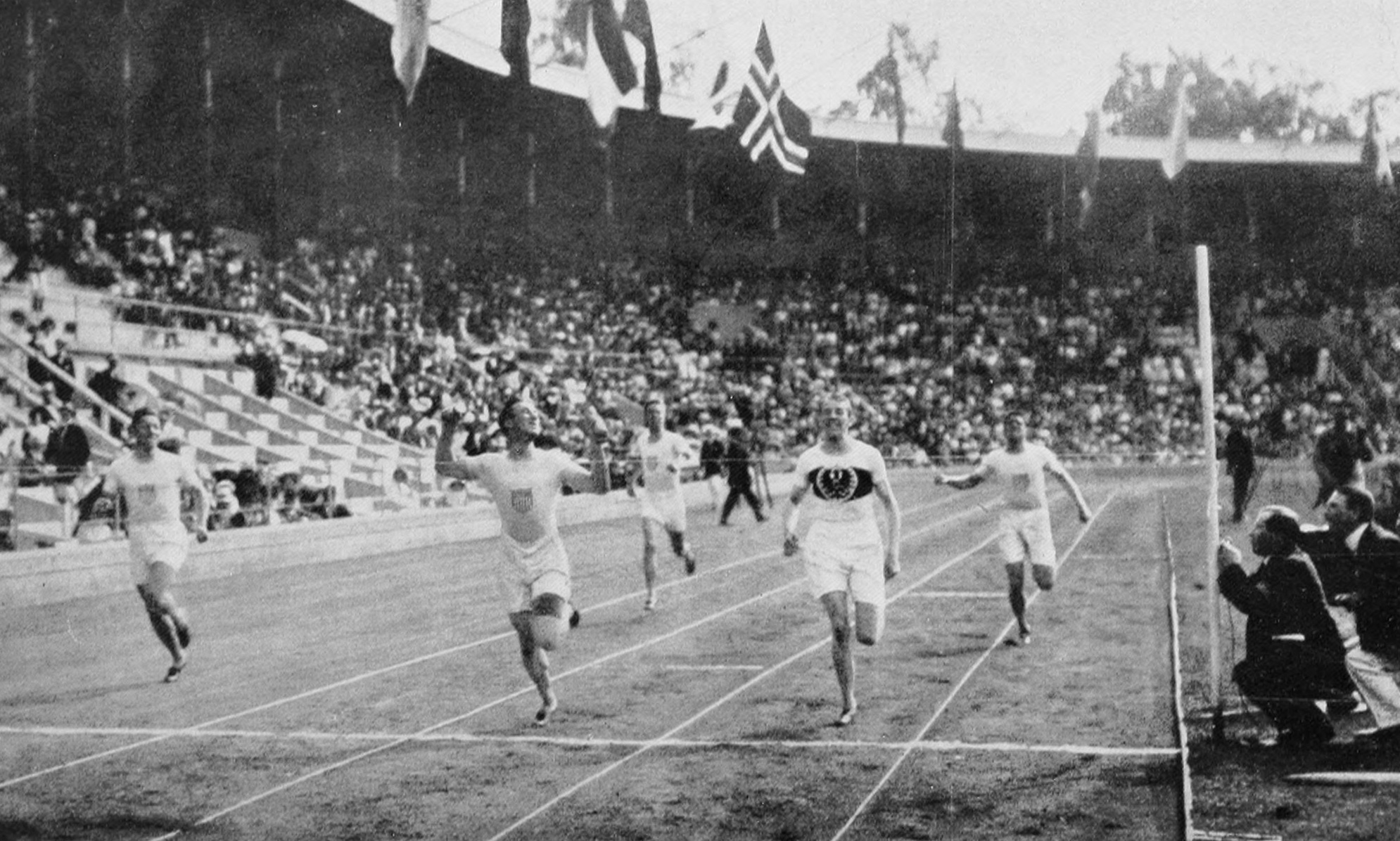
Charles Reidpath (second from left) beats Hanns Braun (second from right) in the final.

The final was held on Saturday, July 13, 1912. It was held in lanes because of the incident between Young and Braun in the semifinals. There were three false starts before the race finally started legally. Meredith led early with a strong pace. Braun took the lead around the halfway mark. Reidpath finished strong, passing Braun in the final 15 metres.

Reidpath's time broke the Olympic record; it was also recognized as the inaugural world record in the event at the formation of World Athletics (then known as the IAAF).

Rank	Lane	Athlete	Nation	Time	Notes
1st place, gold medalist(s)	3	Charles Reidpath	United States	48.2	WR
2nd place, silver medalist(s)	2	Hanns Braun	Germany	48.3	
3rd place, bronze medalist(s)	5	Edward Lindberg	United States	48.4	
4	1	Ted Meredith	United States	49.2	
5	4	Carroll Haff	United States	49.5	
