= Haff =

Haff may refer to:

== People ==
- Carroll Barse Haff (1892–1947), American track and field athlete who competed in the 1912 Summer Olympics
- Bergljot Hobæk Haff (1925–2016), Norwegian novel writer

== Places ==
- Haff, estuarine lagoon along the Southern Baltic coast
- Am Stettiner Haff, Amt in the district of Uecker-Randow, in Mecklenburg-Vorpommern, Germany

== Other ==
- Battle of Frisches Haff
- Haff disease
- Holland Animation Film Festival
