= Eric Lindholm =

Eric Lindholm may refer to:

- Eric Lindholm (athlete) (1890–1957), Swedish track and field athlete
- Eric C. Lindholm, American music conductor
