= Hyozo Omori =

Japanese physical education specialist

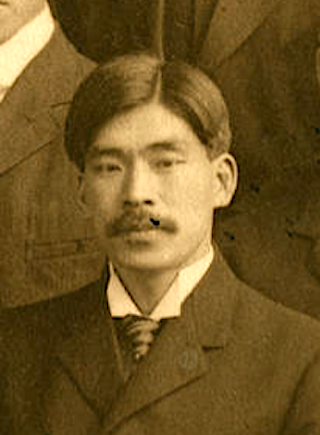
- in 1907
- Born: March 14, 1876; Japan
- Died: January 3, 1913 (aged 36)
- Spouse: Annie Shepley Omori

Hyozo Omori (大森 兵蔵, Ōmori Hyōzō; March 14, 1876 – January 3, 1913) was a Japanese physical education specialist who studied in America and married the American artist Annie Barrows Shepley. In Japan, they established Yurin En (友隣園; House of the Friendly Neighbor), which was a settlement house and leader in the Japanese playground movement. Omori introduced basketball and volleyball to the country and was the team manager at the 1912 Stockholm Olympics in Sweden.

== Education ==
Hyozo Omori was in the 1905 class of Stanford University and then continued his studies in Springfield, Massachusetts as a YMCA exchange student. He graduated from YMCA's College in Springfield with honors in 1907.

== Marriage and career ==
In October 1907, Omori married artist Annie Barrows Shepley. In 1908, when he had returned to Japan, he introduced volleyball and basketball to the country and became known as the "Father of Japanese Basketball". In Tokyo, the Omoris established a settlement house, Yurin En (House of the Friendly Neighbor) which offered dramatic classes and a playground for children. It also offered courses in sewing, flower arranging, cooking, and crafts as well as mother's meetings and opportunities for people to speak English. Initially, they met resistance because of their co-educational programs, the fact that the Omoris were Christian, and that they broke down well-establish class barriers. The Yurin En was at the forefront of the Japanese playground movement.

In 1909, Omori was the Physical Director for the Japanese Association. That year, he wrote "A Brief Survey of the Present Conditions of Physical Education in Japan" for Hygiene and Physical Education.

Hyozo Omori was a physical education specialist and team manager for the Japanese team that competed in the 1912 Stockholm Olympics in Sweden. Yahiko Mishima from Tokyo Imperial University (now University of Tokyo) ran short distances and Shizo Kanakuri, a 20-year-old Tokyo Higher Normal School student, ran the marathon. Judo master Kanō Jigorō was the leader of the team. It was the first time that Japanese runners competed in the Olympics. Omori became quite ill when the group arrived in Stockholm following the Trans-Siberian Railway trip.

Hyozo Omori died in 1913, and Annie continued running Yurin En after his death.
