= Alex Pedersen =

Alex Pedersen may refer to:

- Alexander Pedersen (1891–1955), Norwegian sprinter
- Alex Pedersen (cyclist) (born 1966), Danish cyclist
- Alex Pedersen (politician), American politician on Seattle City Council
