= Ernest Haley =

British sprinter

Personal information
- Born: 3 January 1885 Kensington, London, England
- Died: 20 February 1975 (aged 90) Dulwich, south London, England

Sport
- Sport: Athletics
- Event: Sprinting
- Club: Herne Hill Harriers

Ernest William Haley (3 January 1885 – 20 February 1975) was a British track and field athlete who competed in the 1912 Summer Olympics.

== Biography ==
Haley finished third in the 200 metres at the 1909 AAA Championships and second in the same event at the 1910 AAA Championships.

At the 1912 Olympic Games, he was eliminated in the semi-finals of the 400 metres competition. He was eliminated in the first round in the 200 metres event.

The following year, he finished third behind George Nicol in the 440 yards event at the 1913 AAA Championships.
