= Edward Lindberg =

Track and field competitor

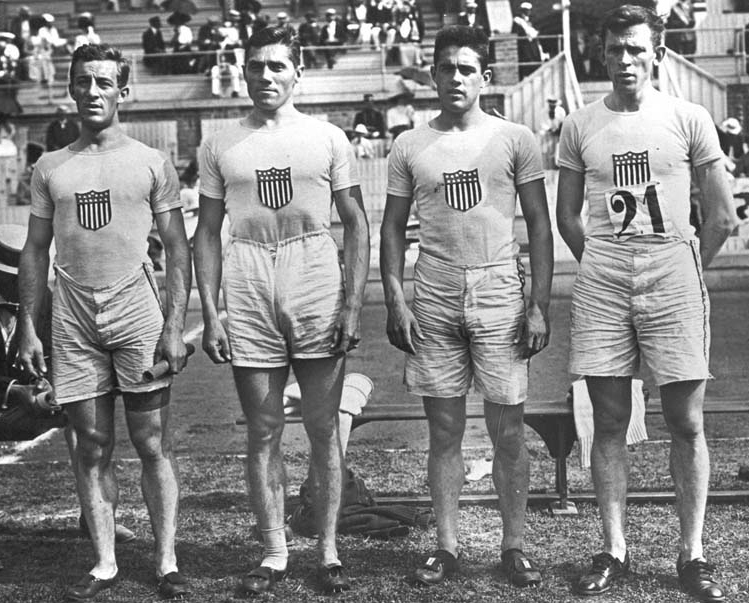
- Charles Reidpath, Edward Lindberg, James Meredith and Melvin Sheppard at the 1912 Olympics

Personal information
- Born: November 9, 1886 Cherokee, Iowa, United States
- Died: February 16, 1978 (aged 91) Highland Park, Illinois, United States
- Height: 1.77 m (5 ft 10 in)
- Weight: 76 kg (168 lb)

Sport
- Sport: Sprint running
- Club: Chicago AA
Medal record
Representing the United States
Gold medal – first place	1912 Stockholm	4 × 400 m relay
Bronze medal – third place	1912 Stockholm	400 metres

Edward Ferdinand Jacob Lindberg (November 9, 1886 – February 16, 1978) was an American Olympic athlete, winner of the gold medal in 4 × 400 m relay at the 1912 Summer Olympics in Stockholm, Sweden. He was born in Cherokee, Iowa and died in Highland Park, Illinois.

Lindberg was a member of Big Ten champion track & field teams at the University of Illinois in 1906 and 1909 and won the AAU championships in 440 yd in 1909 and 1911. At the Stockholm Olympics, Lindberg won the bronze medal in 400 m and ran the second leg in the American 4 × 400 m relay team, which won the gold medal with a new world record of 3:16.6. At the same Olympics, he competed in the baseball event which was held as demonstration sport.
