= Erich Lehmann =

Erich Lehmann is the name of

- Erich Lehmann (athlete) (1890-1917), German sprinter and middle-distance runner
- Erich Leo Lehmann (1917–2009), American statistician
