= Paul Zerling =

Swedish sprinter

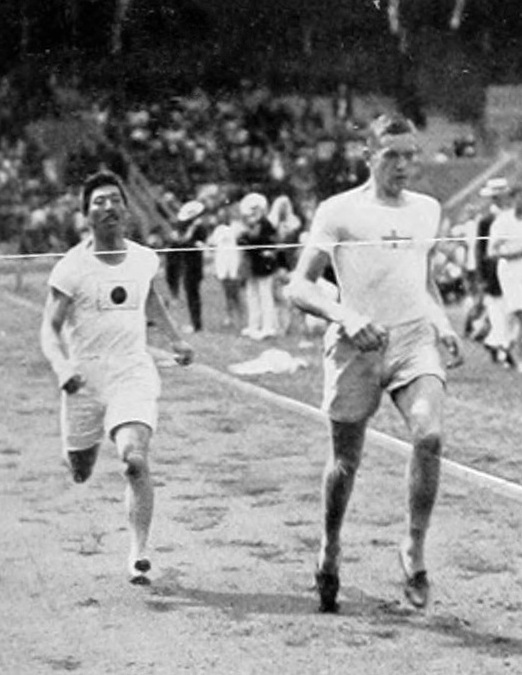
- Paul Zerling (right) racing 400 m against Yahiko Mishima at the 1912 Olympics

Personal information
- Born: 7 April 1890 Svartsjö, Stockholm, Sweden
- Died: 16 May 1972 (aged 82) Stockholm, Sweden
- Height: 1.80 m (5 ft 11 in)
- Weight: 73 kg (161 lb)

Sport
- Sport: Sprint running
- Club: AIK

Paul G. Zerling (7 April 1890 – 16 May 1972) was a Swedish sprint runner who competed at the 1912 Summer Olympics. He was eliminated in the semi-finals of the 400 m competition. He was also a member of the Swedish relay team which was eliminated in the first round of the 4 × 400 m relay event.
