= Japan at the 1912 Summer Olympics =

- IOC code: JPN
- NOC: Japanese Olympic Committee

in Stockholm
- Competitors: 2 in 1 sport
- Flag bearer: Yahiko Mishima
- Medals: Gold 0 Silver 0 Bronze 0 Total 0

Summer Olympics appearances (overview)
- 1912; 1920; 1924; 1928; 1932; 1936; 1948; 1952; 1956; 1960; 1964; 1968; 1972; 1976; 1980; 1984; 1988; 1992; 1996; 2000; 2004; 2008; 2012; 2016; 2020; 2024; 2028

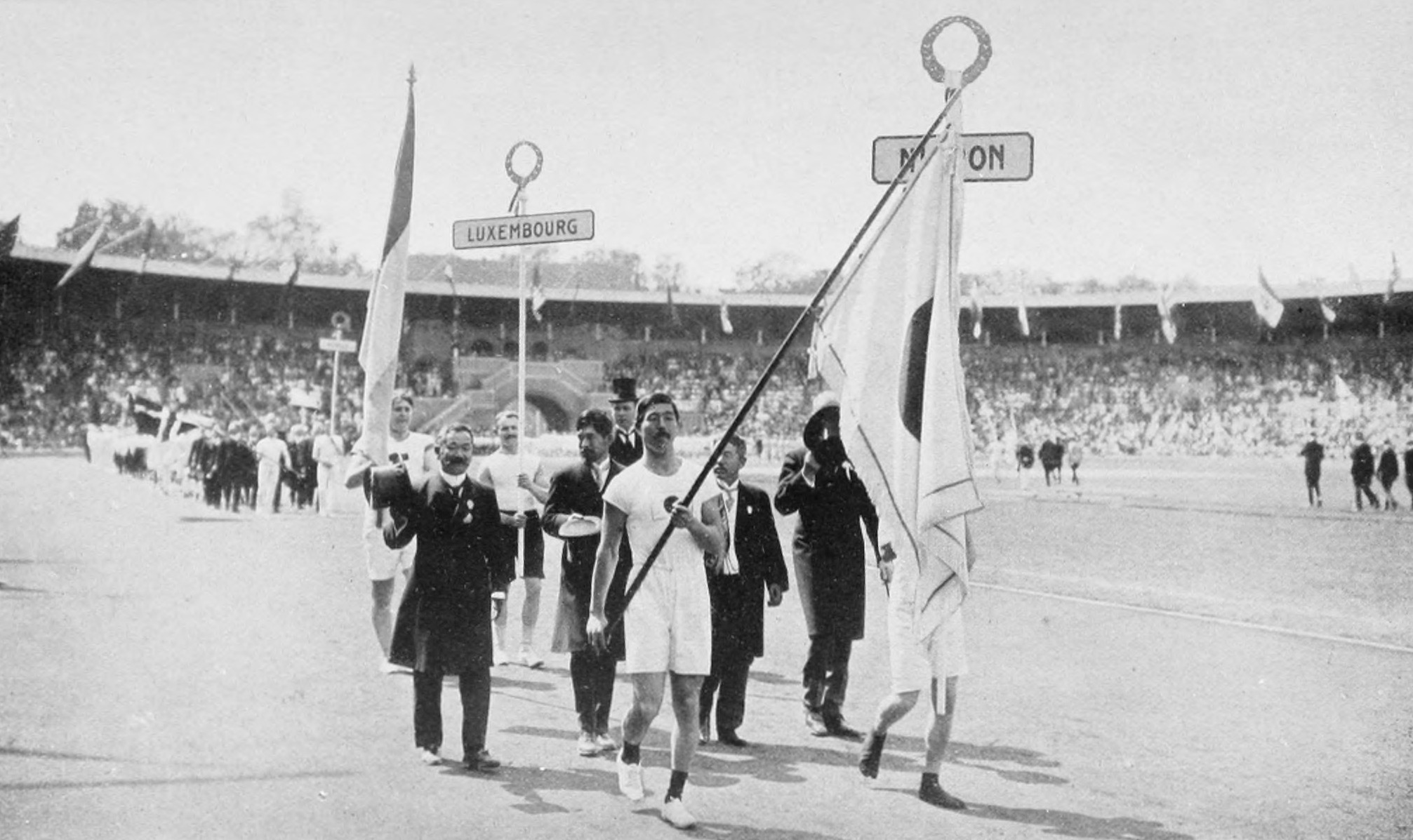
The team of Japan at the opening ceremony.

The Empire of Japan competed at the Summer Olympic Games for the first time at the 1912 Summer Olympics in Stockholm, Sweden.

== Background ==
When Pierre de Coubertin formulated the modern Olympic Games, it was his intent for the games to be global in scale. However, no athletes from any Asian nation participated in the first four games, which was a cause for great concern. Kristian Hellström of the Swedish Olympic Committee wrote to the government of Japan to ask if they were going to send teams to the 1912 Olympics. The Japanese government did not want to embarrass itself on an international stage by saying no, so the Ministry of Education was told to look into this. The Ministry turned to Kanō Jigorō, the founder of modern judo, with recent experience in Europe. Kanō, after talking to the French ambassador to Japan and reading pamphlets sent by the Swedes, developed, in his words, "a fairly good idea of what the Olympic Games were" and agreed to become a member of the International Olympic Committee.

However, the Ministry of Education was uncooperative in providing any funding for participation in the Olympics, so Kanō approached the Japan Physical Education Society (Nippon Taiiku Kai) instead. However, the necessary funding was still not forthcoming, so in 1912, Kanō helped establish the Japan Amateur Athletic Association (Dai Nippon Tai-iku Kyokai), of which he became president.

== Athletics ==
Two athletes represented Japan in that nation's Olympic debut. Mishima advanced to the semifinals in one of his three events, but did not start the semifinal race. Kanakuri abandoned the marathon due to the heat; because he never notified race officials before returning to Japan, Swedish authorities considered him missing for 50 years before discovering that he was living in Japan oblivious to his status in Sweden. Finally notified, Kanakuri finished the marathon more than 54 years after he started, with an unofficial score measured to the same tenths of a second standard as used for other runners at the 1912 marathon (54 y, 8 m, 6 d, 8:32:20.3).

Ranks given are within that athlete's heat for running events.

Athlete	Events	Heat		Semifinal		Final	
Athlete	Events	Result	Rank	Result	Rank	Result	Rank
Mishima Yahiko	100 m	?	5	did not advance			
Mishima Yahiko	200 m	?	5	did not advance			
Mishima Yahiko	400 m	55.5	2 Q	did not start		did not advance	
Kanakuri Shizō	Marathon	N/A				54:08:06:08:32:20.3 (Note: Unofficial)	36
