= Claude Ross =

Australian track and field athlete

Claude Murray Ross (13 May 1893 – 17 August 1917) was an Australian track and field athlete. Ross competed in the men's 400 metres for Australasia at the 1912 Summer Olympics.

In 1914, Ross from Victoria enlisted in the Field Artillery Brigade of the 1st Division, First Australian Imperial Force. In 1915, Ross was at both the April landing and December evacuation of the Gallipoli Campaign. In early 1917, he gained his commission in the Royal Flying Corps. Ross was killed on 17 August 1917, aged 24, in the skies over France.

== See also ==
- List of Olympians killed in World War I
