= Lagoon =

Shallow body of water separated from a larger one by a narrow landform

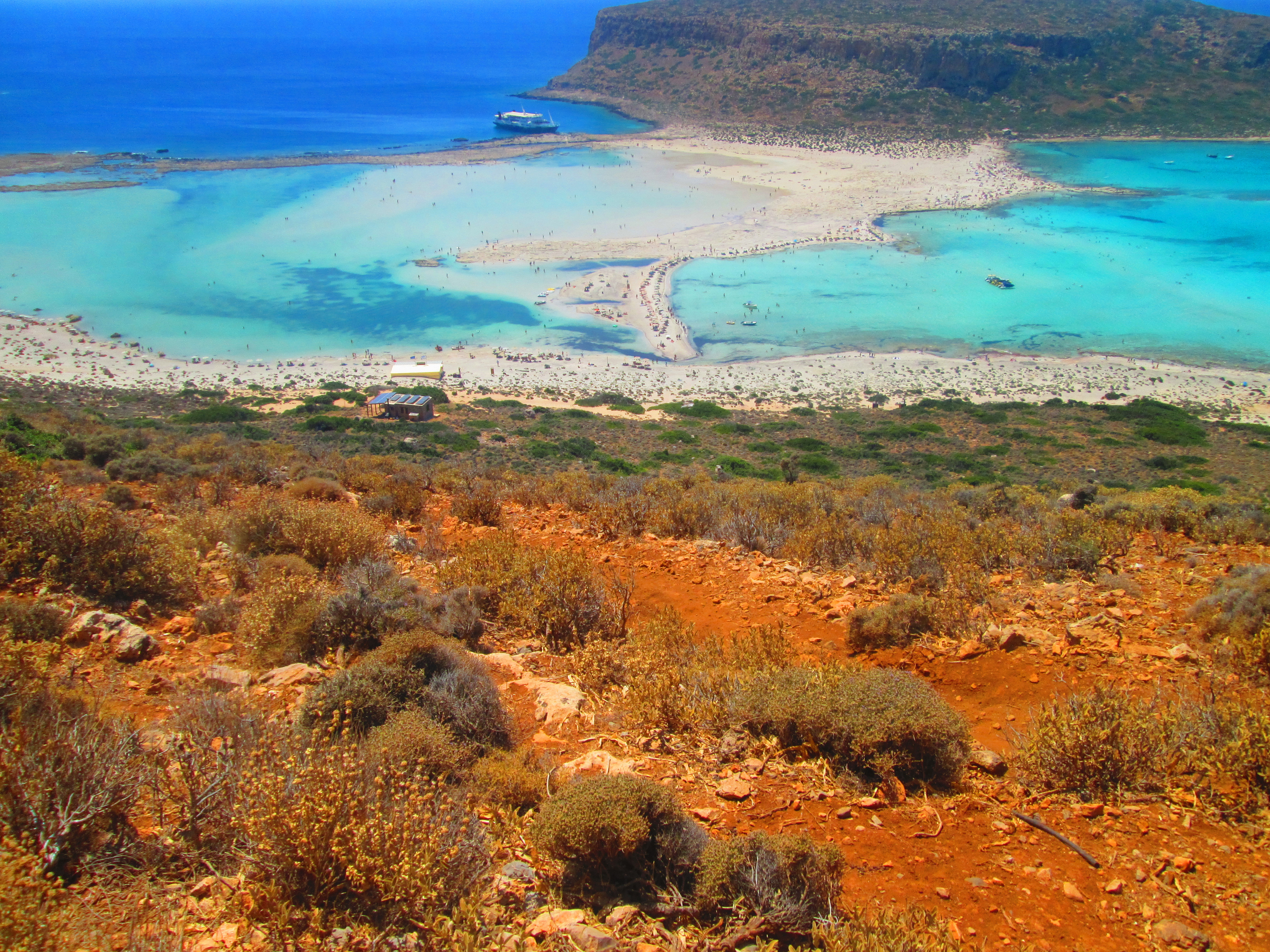
Balos coastal lagoon of northwestern Crete. The shallow lagoon is separated from the Mediterranean Sea by narrow shoals connecting to a small, rocky mountain.

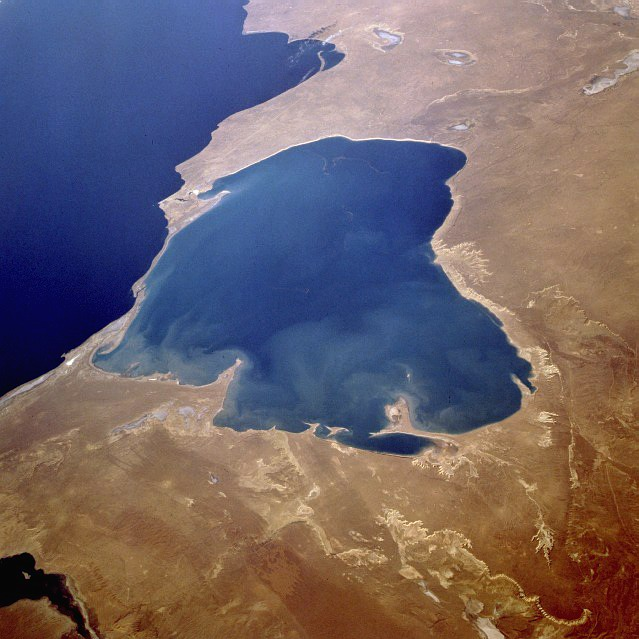
Garabogazköl lagoon in Turkmenistan

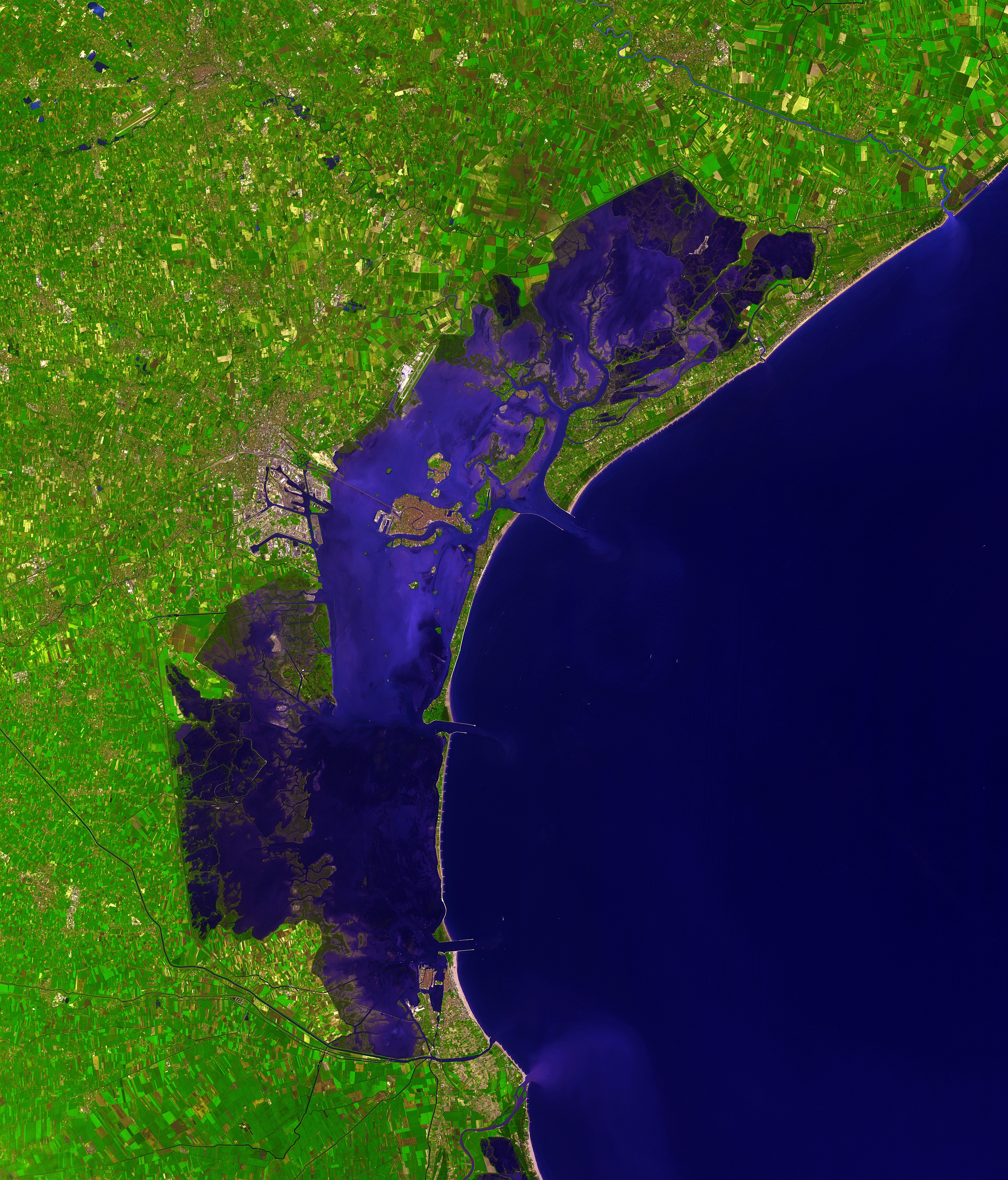
Venetian Lagoon

A lagoon is a shallow body of water separated from a larger body of water by a narrow landform, such as a reef, a barrier island or islands, a barrier peninsula, or an isthmus. Lagoons are commonly divided into coastal lagoons (or barrier lagoons) and atoll lagoons. They have also been identified as occurring on mixed-sand and gravel coastlines. There is an overlap between bodies of water classified as coastal lagoons and bodies of water classified as estuaries. Lagoons are common coastal features around many parts of the world.

== Definition and terminology ==
Lagoons are shallow, often elongated bodies of water separated from a larger body of water by a shallow or exposed shoal, coral reef, or similar feature. Some authorities include fresh water bodies in the definition of "lagoon", while others explicitly restrict "lagoon" to bodies of water with some degree of salinity. The distinction between "lagoon" and "estuary" also varies between authorities. Richard A. Davis Jr. restricts "lagoon" to bodies of water with little or no fresh water inflow, and little or no tidal flow, and calls any bay that receives a regular flow of fresh water an "estuary". Davis does state that the terms "lagoon" and "estuary" are "often loosely applied, even in scientific literature". Timothy M. Kusky characterizes lagoons as normally being elongated parallel to the coast, while estuaries are usually drowned river valleys, elongated perpendicular to the coast. Coastal lagoons are classified as inland bodies of water.

When used within the context of a distinctive portion of coral reef ecosystems, the term "lagoon" is synonymous with the term "back reef" or "backreef", which is more commonly used by coral reef scientists to refer to the same area.

Many lagoons do not include "lagoon" in their common names. Currituck, Albemarle and Pamlico Sounds in North Carolina, Great South Bay between Long Island and the barrier beaches of Fire Island in New York, Isle of Wight Bay, which separates Ocean City, Maryland from the rest of Worcester County, Maryland, Banana River in Florida, US, Lake Illawarra in New South Wales, Australia, Montrose Basin in Scotland, and Broad Water in Wales have all been classified as lagoons, despite their names. In England, The Fleet at Chesil Beach has also been described as a lagoon.

=== Etymology ===
Lagoon is derived from the Venetian łaguna, which refers to the waters around Venice, i.e. the Venetian Lagoon; that in itself descends from Latin: lacuna derivant of lacus “lake”. Laguna is attested in English by at least 1612, and had been Anglicized to lagune by 1673. In 1697 William Dampier referred to a "Lagune or Lake of Salt water" on the coast of Mexico. Captain James Cook described an island "of Oval form with a Lagoon in the middle" in 1769. In Latin America, the Romance Spanish cognate laguna may be used for a small fresh water lake in a similar way a creek is considered a small river. However, sometimes it is popularly used to describe a full-sized lake, such as Laguna Catemaco in Mexico, which is actually the third-largest lake by area in the country. The brackish water lagoon may be thus explicitly identified as a "coastal lagoon" (laguna costera). Similarly in Portuguese, lagoa may be a body of shallow seawater, or a small freshwater lake not linked to the sea.

In some languages the word for a lagoon is simply a type of lake: in Chinese, a lake is 湖 hú whereas a lagoon is 潟湖 xìhú. In the French Mediterranean several lagoons are called étang ("lake"). Contrariwise, several other languages have specific words for such bodies of water. In Spanish, coastal lagoons generically are laguna costera, but those on the Mediterranean coast are specifically called albufera. In Russian and Ukrainian, those on the Black Sea are liman (лиман), while the generic word is laguna (Лагуна). Similarly, in the Baltic, Danish has the specific Nor, and German the specifics Bodden and Haff, as well as generic terms derived from laguna. In Poland these lagoons are called zalew ("bay"), and in Lithuania marios ("lagoon, reservoir"). In Jutland several lagoons are known as fjord. In New Zealand the Māori word hapua refers to a coastal lagoon formed at the mouth of a braided river where there are mixed sand and gravel beaches, while waituna, an ephemeral coastal waterbody, is neither a true lagoon, lake, nor estuary. The Māori word for “lake” itself, roto, carries semantic drift where cognates in related Polynesian languages like Rarotongan (or variants like Samoan: loto, Hawaiian: loko) refer to lagoons typical of tropical atolls.

Some languages differentiate between coastal and atoll lagoons. In French, lagon refers specifically to an atoll lagoon, while coastal lagoons are described as étang, the generic word for a still lake or pond. In Vietnamese, Đầm san hô refers to an atoll lagoon, whilst Đầm phá is coastal.

== Atoll lagoons ==
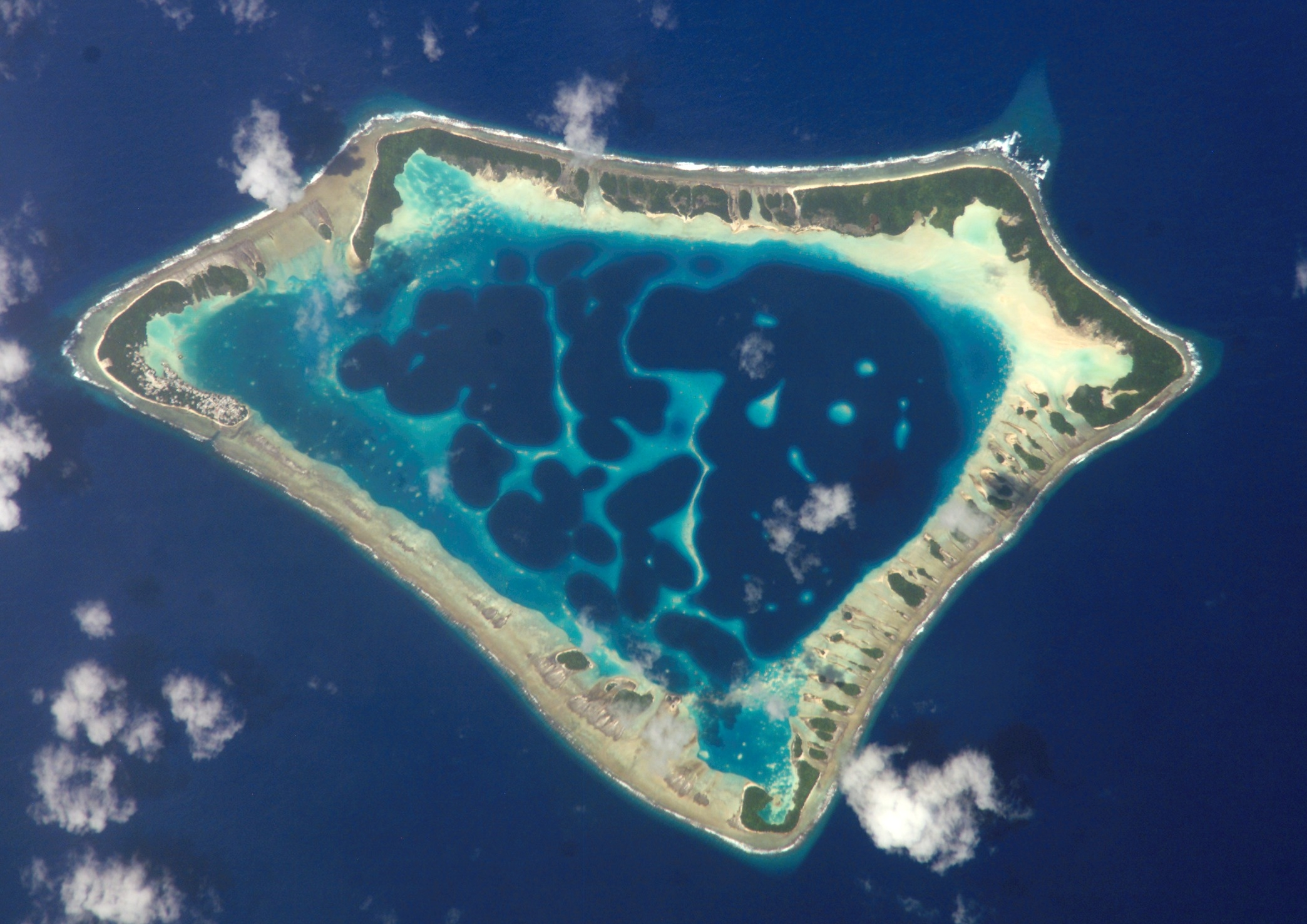
Satellite picture of the Atafu atoll in Tokelau in the Pacific Ocean

Atoll lagoons form as tropical coral reefs grow upwards while the islands that the reefs surround subside, until eventually only the reefs remain above sea level. Unlike the lagoons that form shoreward of fringing reefs, atoll lagoons often contain some deep (>20 m (66 ft)) portions.

== Coastal lagoons ==
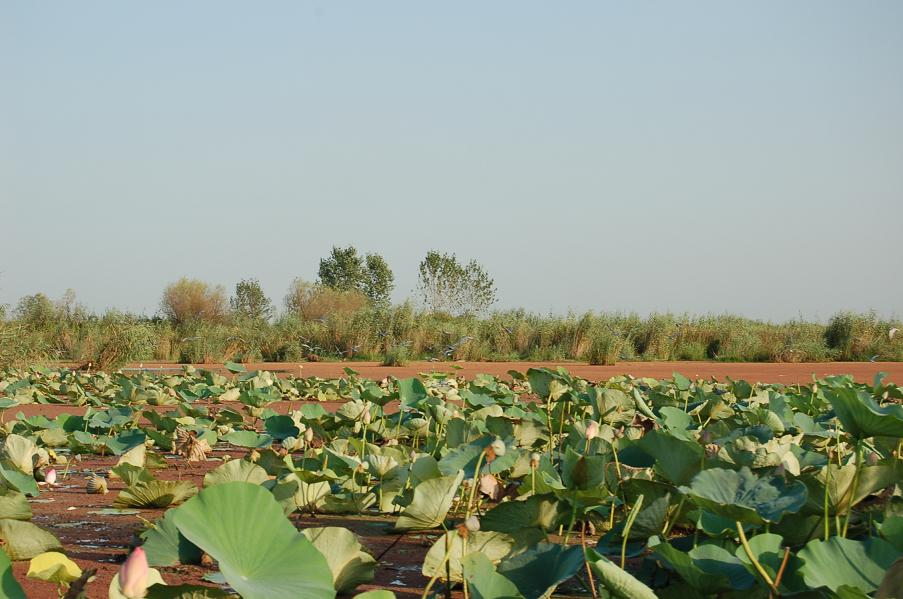
Anzali Lagoon in southwestern Caspian Sea coast, Iran

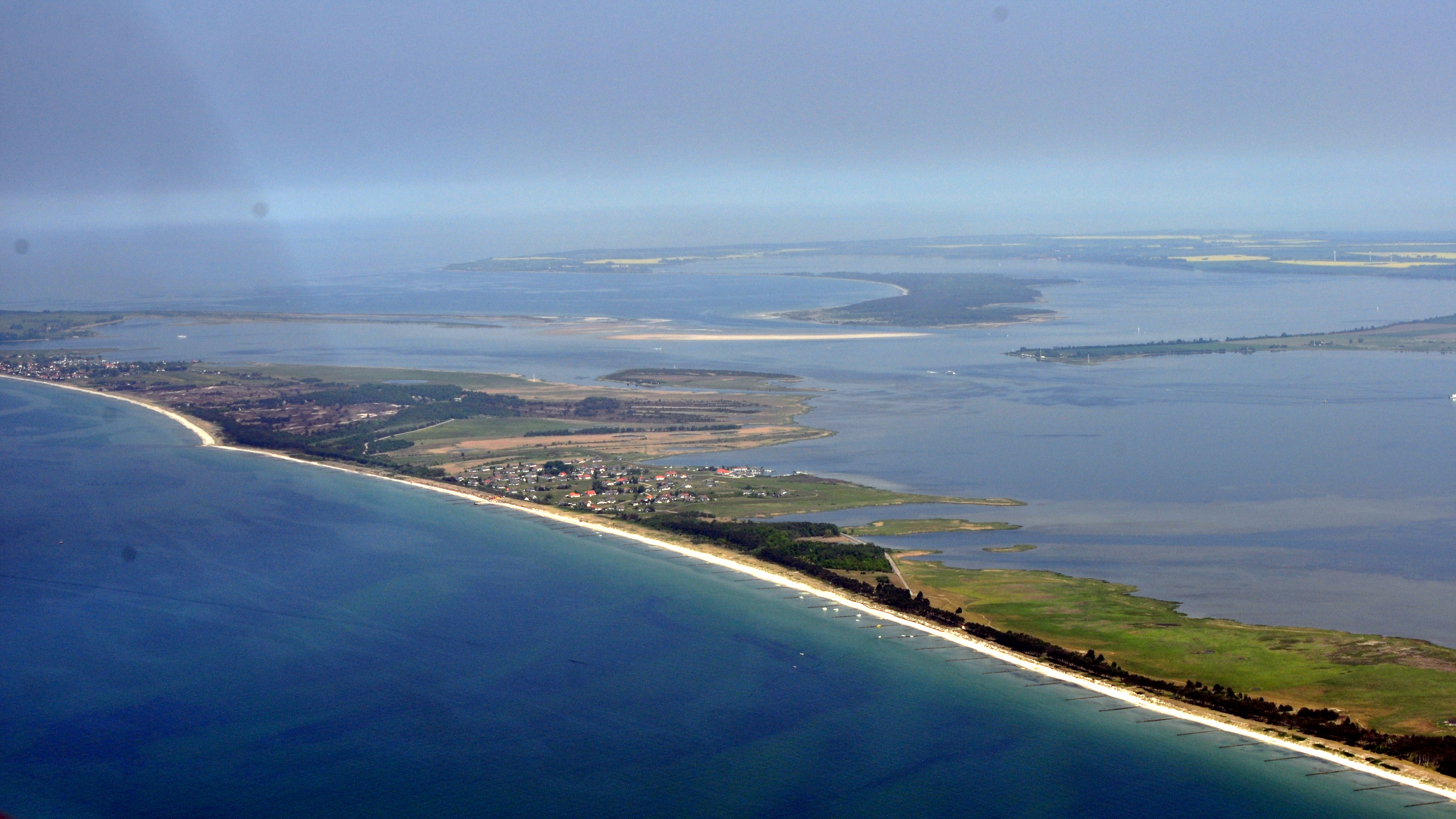
Coastal lagoon landscapes around the island of Hiddensee near Stralsund, Germany. Many similar coastal lagoons can be found around the Western Pomerania Lagoon Area National Park.

Coastal lagoons form along gently sloping coasts where barrier islands or reefs can develop offshore, and the sea-level is rising relative to the land along the shore (either because of an intrinsic rise in sea-level, or subsidence of the land along the coast). Coastal lagoons do not form along steep or rocky coasts, or if the range of tides is more than 4 metres (13 ft). Due to the gentle slope of the coast, coastal lagoons are shallow. A relative drop in sea level may leave a lagoon largely dry, while a rise in sea level may let the sea breach or destroy barrier islands, and leave reefs too deep underwater to protect the lagoon. Coastal lagoons are young and dynamic, and may be short-lived in geological terms. Coastal lagoons are common, occurring along nearly 15 percent of the world's shorelines. In the United States, lagoons are found along more than 75 percent of the Eastern and Gulf Coasts.

Coastal lagoons can be classified as leaky, restricted, or choked. Coastal lagoons are usually connected to the open ocean by inlets between barrier islands. The number and size of the inlets, precipitation, evaporation, and inflow of fresh water all affect the nature of the lagoon. Lagoons with little or no interchange with the open ocean, little or no inflow of fresh water, and high evaporation rates, such as Lake St. Lucia, in South Africa, may become highly saline. Lagoons with no connection to the open ocean and significant inflow of fresh water, such as the Lake Worth Lagoon in Florida in the middle of the 19th century, may be entirely fresh. On the other hand, lagoons with many wide inlets, such as the Wadden Sea, have strong tidal currents and mixing. Coastal lagoons tend to accumulate sediments from inflowing rivers, from runoff from the shores of the lagoon, and from sediment carried into the lagoon through inlets by the tide. Large quantities of sediment may be occasionally be deposited in a lagoon when storm waves overwash barrier islands. Mangroves and marsh plants can facilitate the accumulation of sediment in a lagoon. Benthic organisms may stabilize or destabilize sediments.

=== Largest coastal lagoons ===
Lagoon	Area	Country
New Caledonian lagoon	24,000 km^{2} (9,300 sq mi)	New Caledonia
Garabogazköl	18,000 km^{2} (6,900 sq mi)	Turkmenistan
Lake Maracaibo	13,512 km^{2} (5,217 sq mi)	Venezuela
Lagoa dos Patos (Note: The largest choked coastal lagoon.)	10,100 km^{2} (4,000 sq mi)	Brazil
Albemarle-Pamlico sound system	7,800 km^{2} (3,000 sq mi)	United States
Lagos Lagoon	6,354.7 km^{2} (2,453.6 sq mi)	Nigeria
Curonian lagoon	1,619 km^{2} (625 sq mi)	Lithuania /Russia
Mayotte lagoon	~1,500 km^{2} (600 sq mi)	France
Rangiroa lagoon	1,446 km^{2} (600 sq mi)	French Polynesia
Chilika Lake	1,165 km^{2} (450 sq mi) during monsoon season, 906 km^{2} (350 sq mi) during dry season	India
Caratasca Lagoon	1,110 km^{2} (430 sq mi)	Honduras
Indian River Lagoon	910 km^{2} (353 sq mi)	United States
Vistula lagoon	838 km^{2} (324 sq mi)	Russia /Poland
Biscayne Bay System —Biscayne Bay (traditional)	703 km^{2} (271 sq mi); 572 km^{2} (221 sq mi)	United States
Marovo lagoon	700 km^{2} (270 sq mi)	Solomon Islands
Szczecin Lagoon	689 km^{2} (266 sq mi)	Germany / Poland
Venetian Lagoon	550 km^{2} (210 sq mi)	Italy

== Images ==
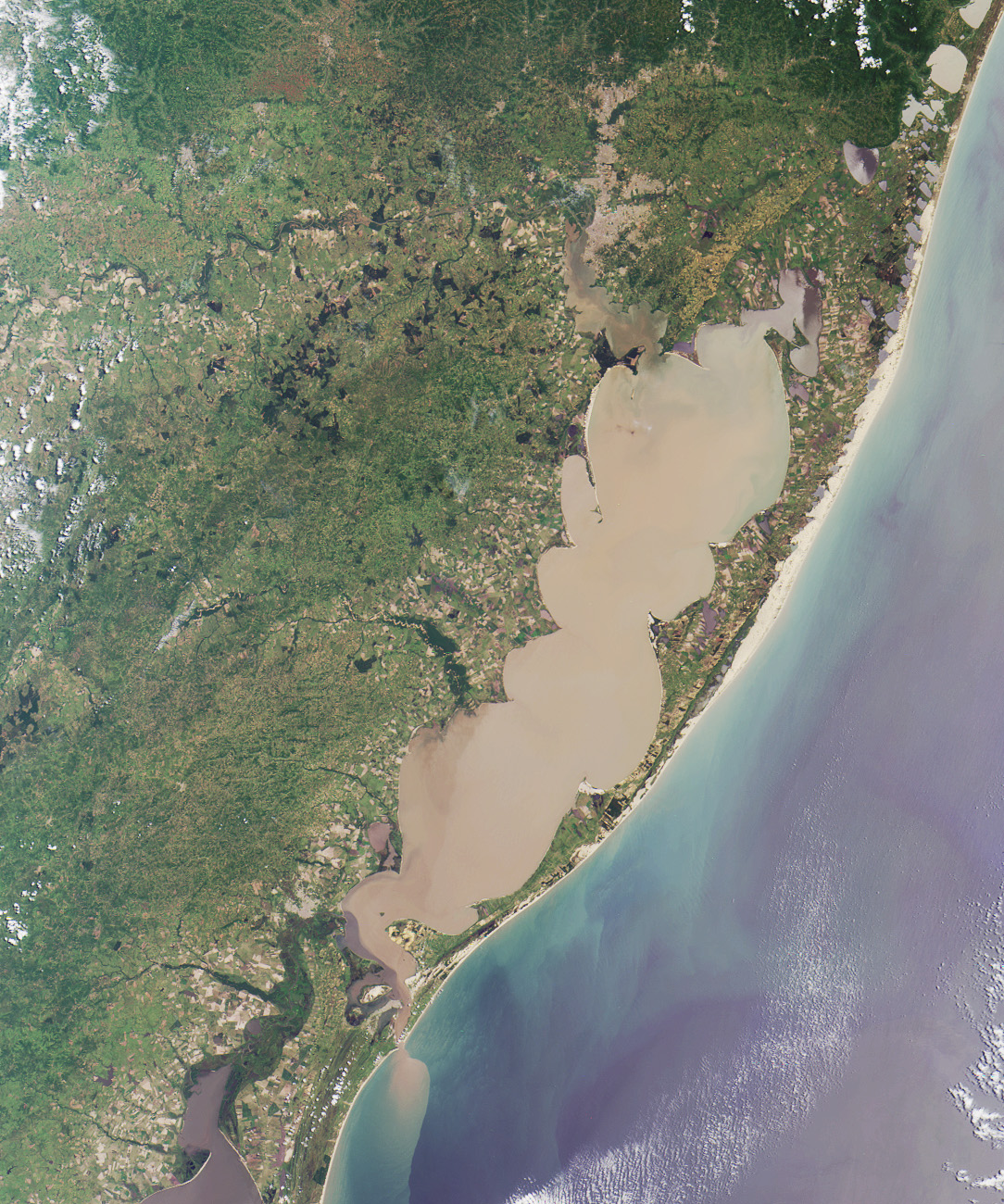
Lagoa dos Patos, the largest lagoon in South America, in the Brazilian state of Rio Grande do Sul.

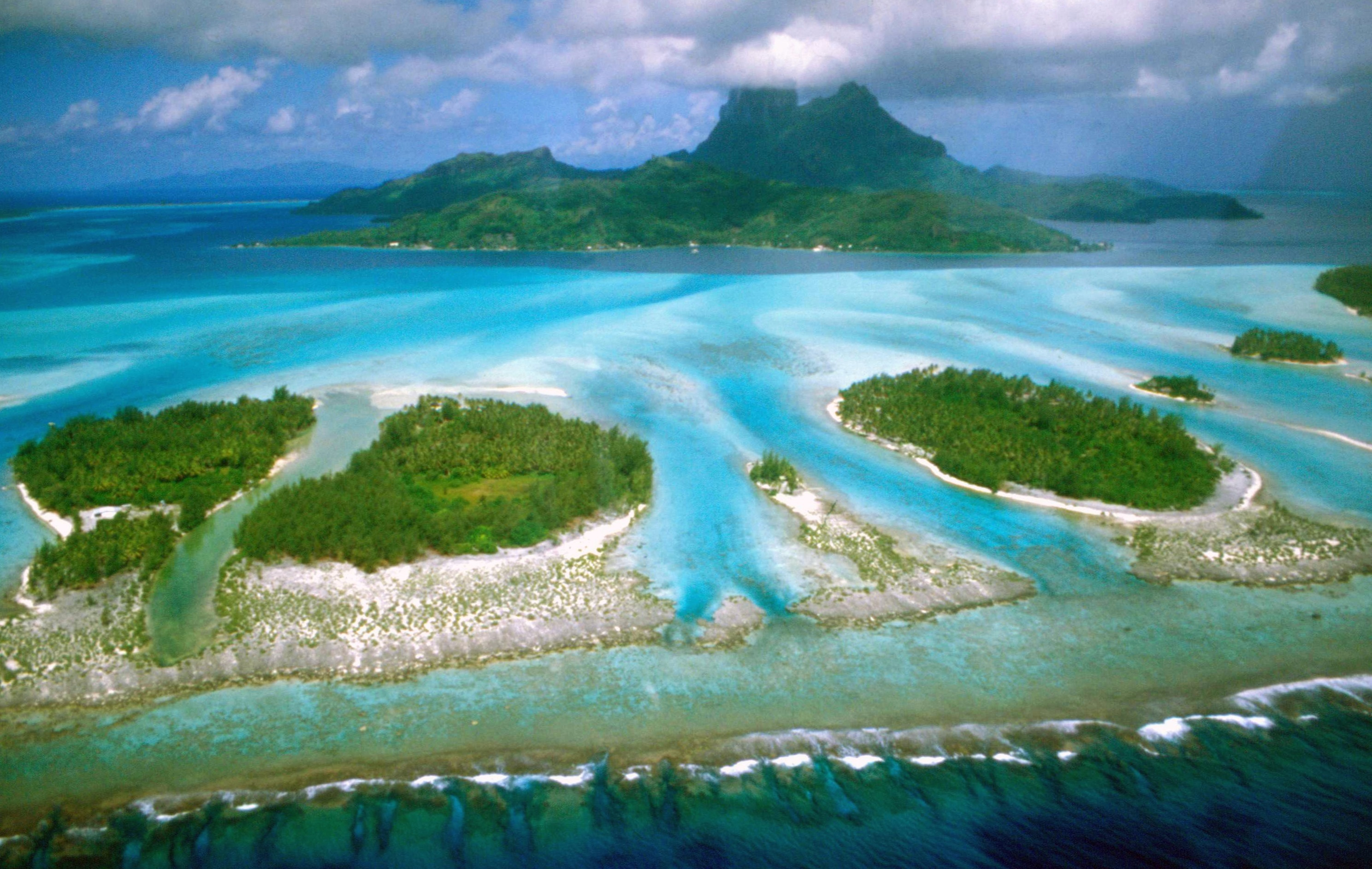
Aerial view of Bora Bora in French Polynesia.

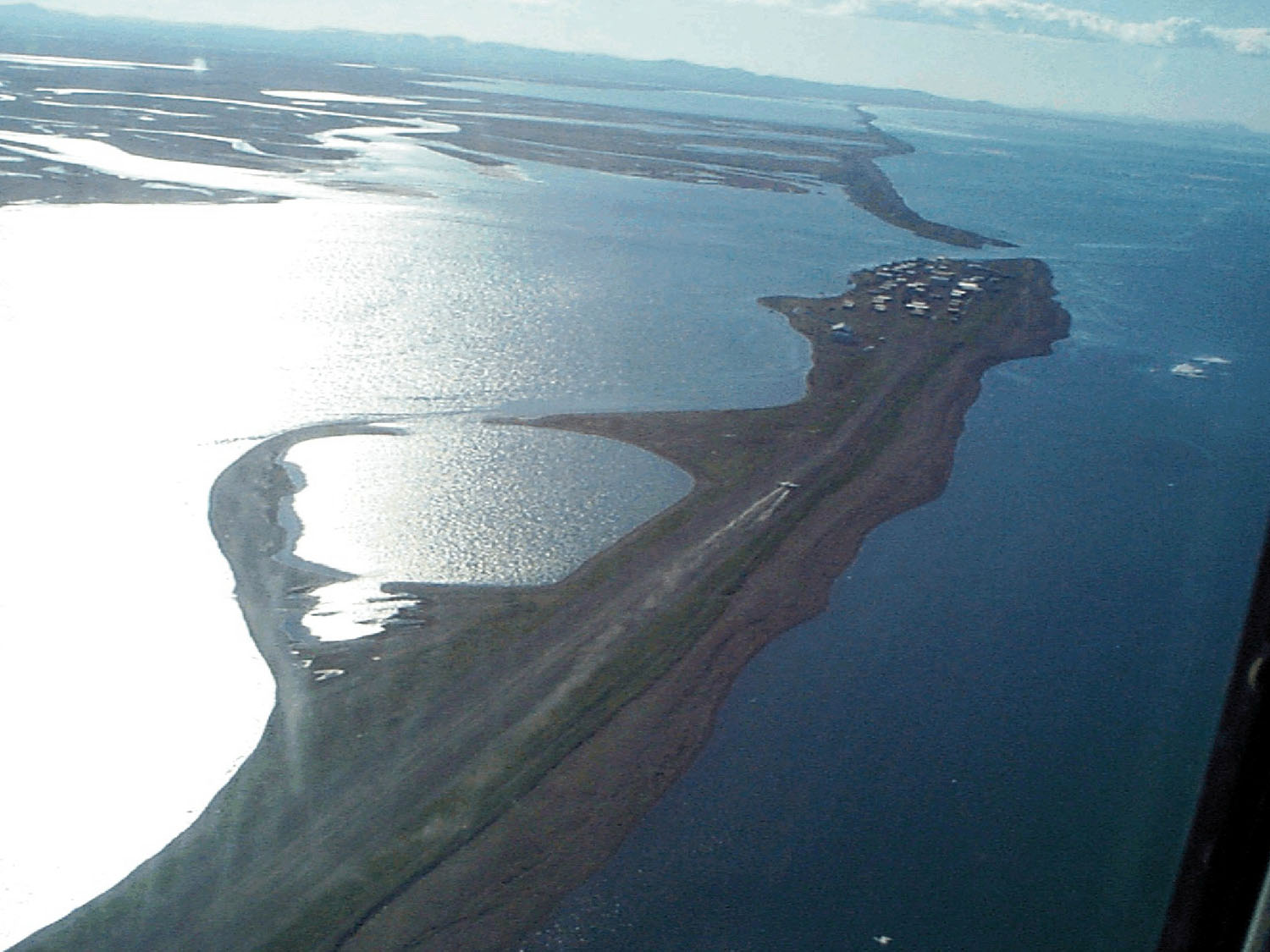
Aerial view of Kivalina, Alaska from the northwest.

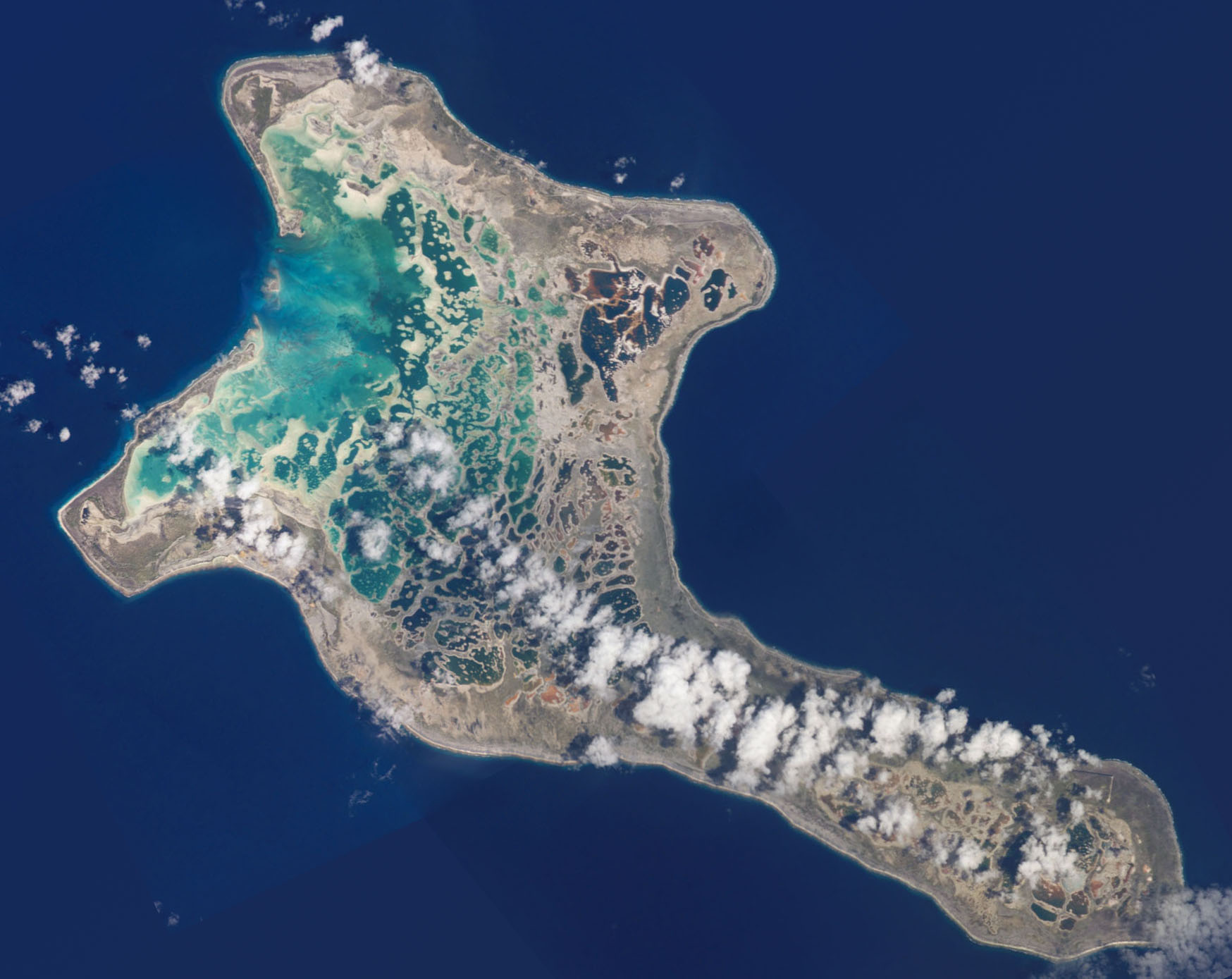
Nearly half the area of Kiritimati is covered with lagoons, some freshwater and some seawater.

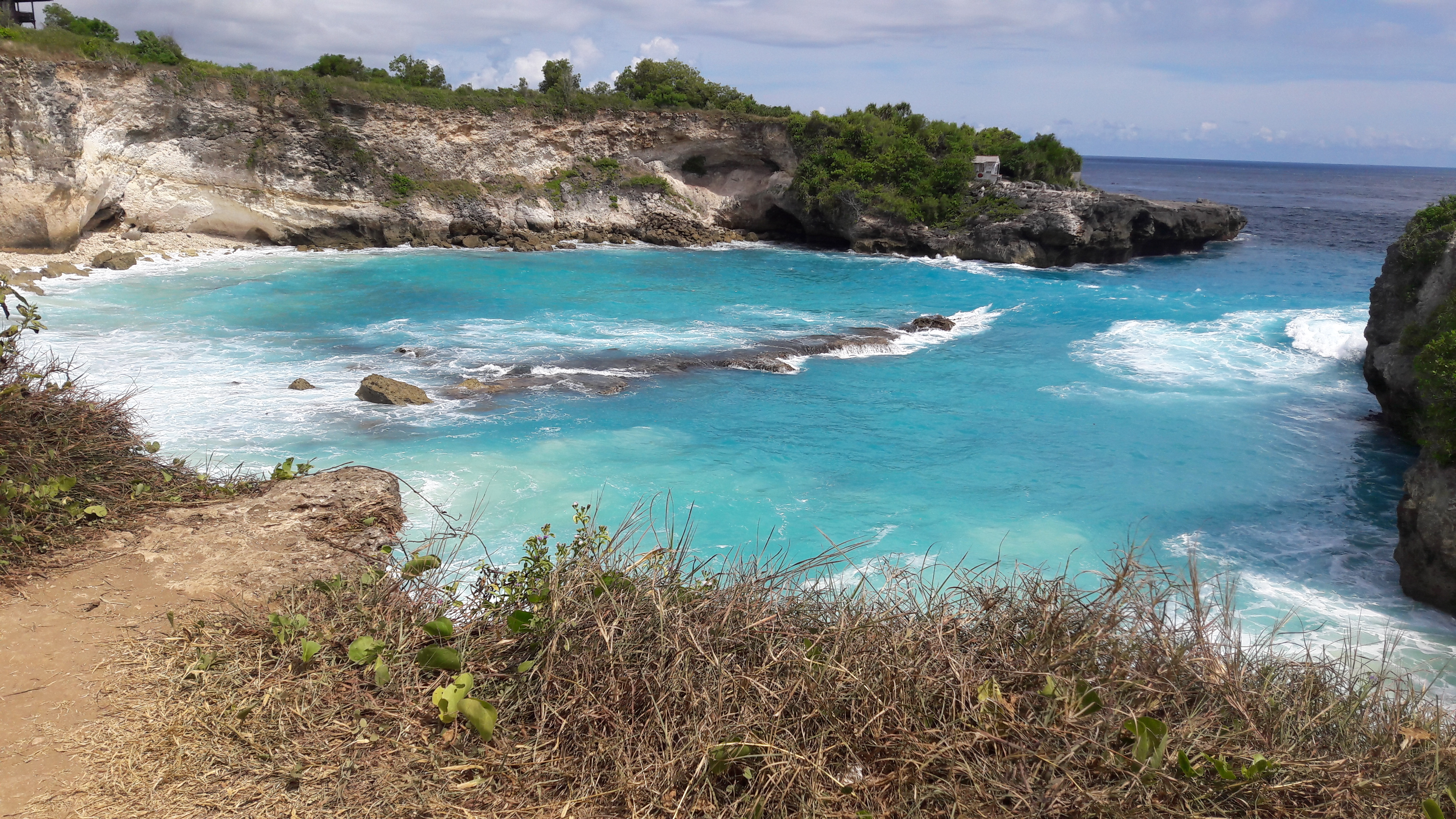
Nusa Lembongan Lagoon, Bali, Indonesia.

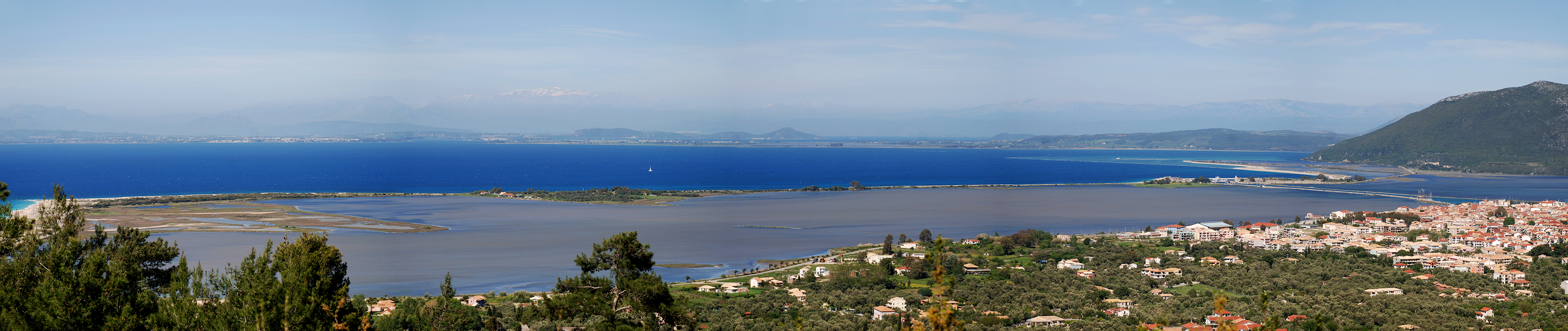
Panoramic view of Lefkada City Lagoon, Lefkada Isl., Ionian Islands Prefecture, Greece.

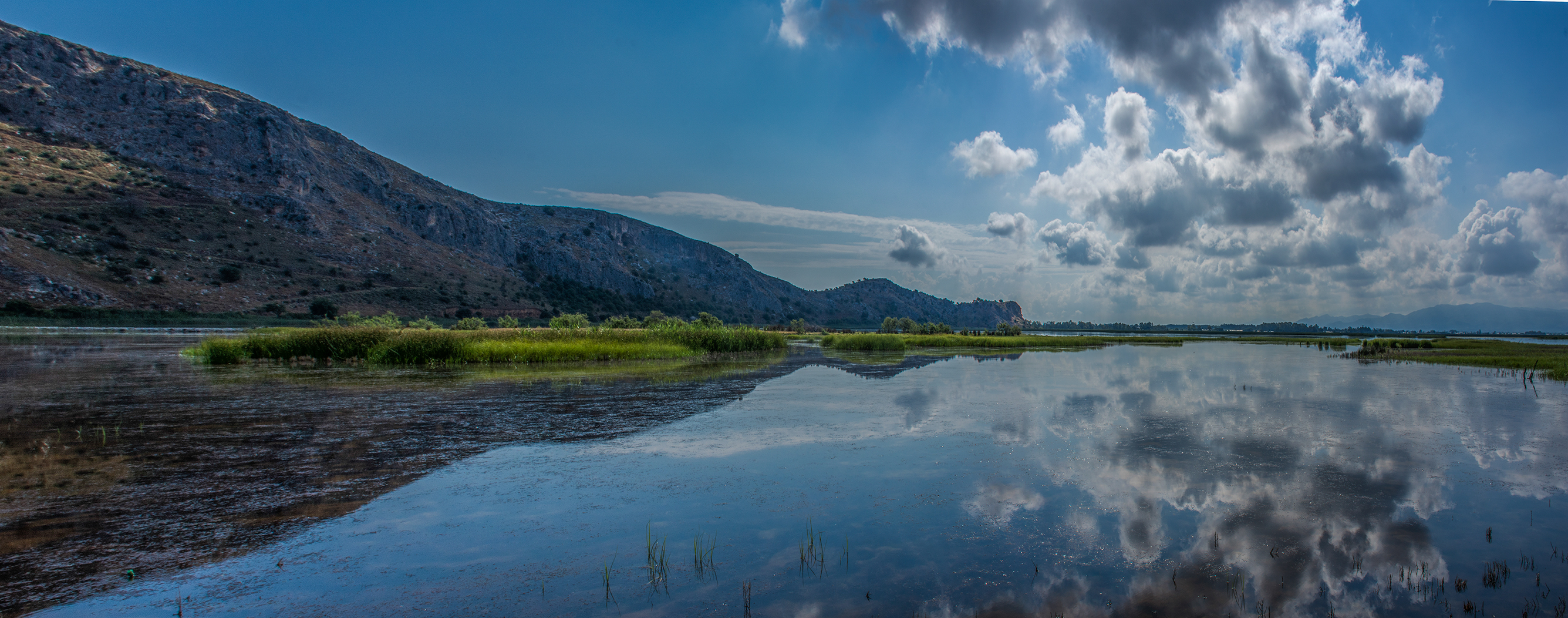
Panoramic view of Prokopos Lagoon, Achaia, Western Greece Prefecture, Greece.

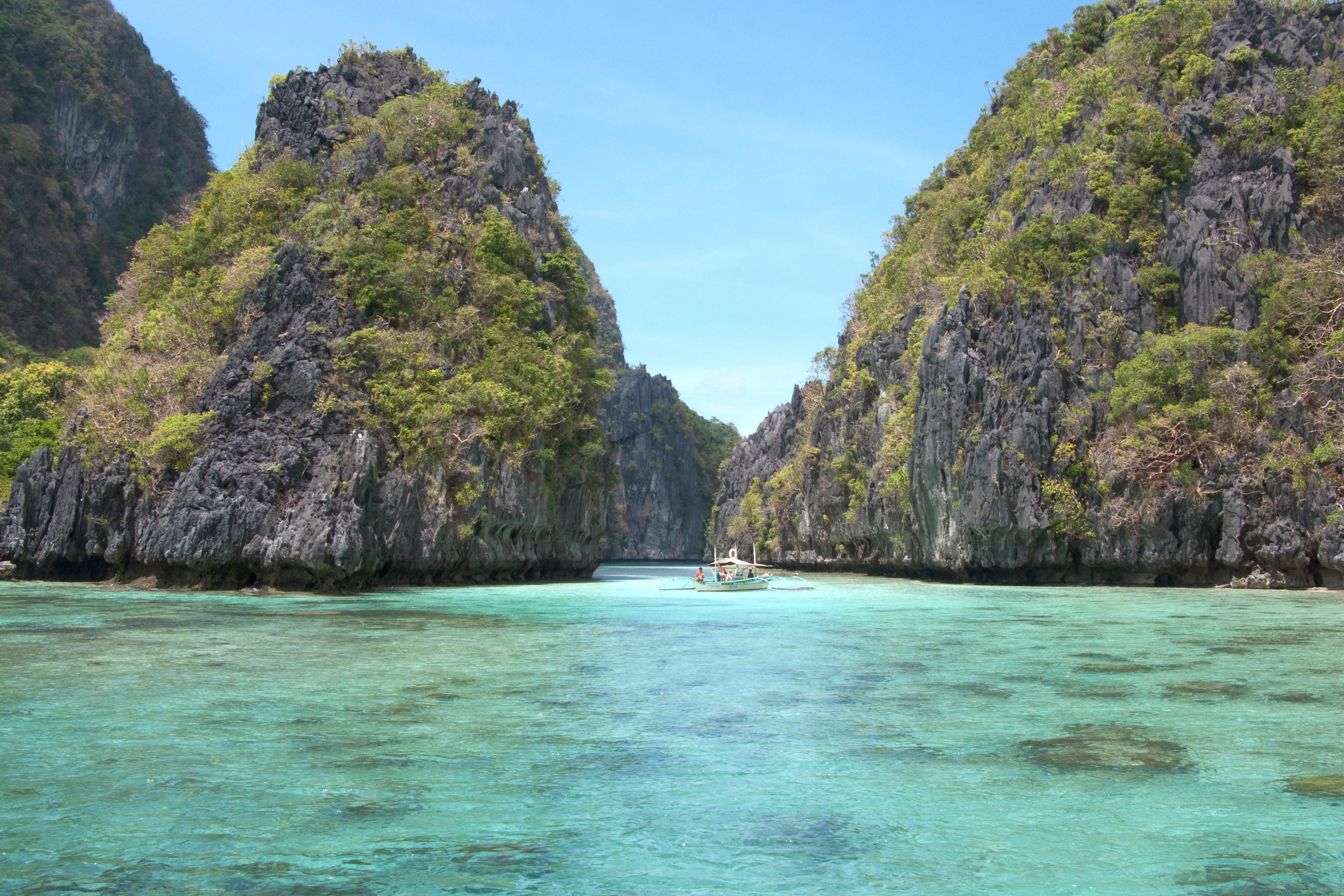
Tropical lagoon in Bacuit Bay, Palawan, Philippines.

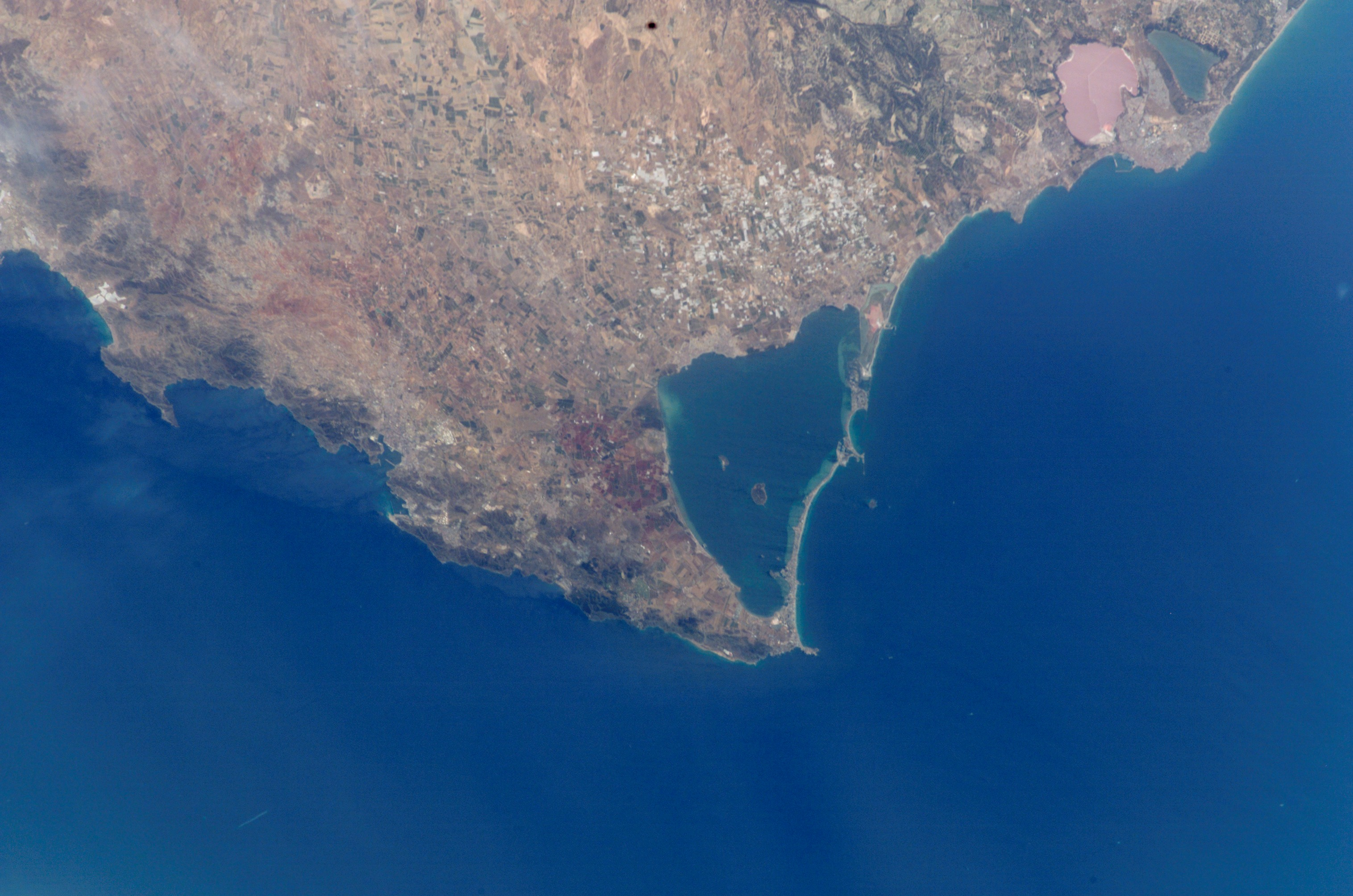
Photo of Mar Menor as seen from International Space Station.

== See also ==
- Aerated lagoon
- Anaerobic lagoon
- Ayre (landform)
- Barachois
- Braided river
- Estuary
- Haff (estuarine lagoon)
- Longshore drift
- Sediment transport
