= Thomas Gallon =

Canadian sprinter (1886–1945)

Thomas Heaton Gallon (November 28, 1886 – September 28, 1945) was a Texas native who went to Canada as a young man, where he became a track and field athlete and competed in the 1912 Summer Olympics.

In 1912, he was eliminated in the first round of the 400 metres competition. He was also a member of the Canadian relay team, which was eliminated in the first round of the 4x400 metre relay event.

Later, he became a captain in World War I with the First Division, 16th Battalion, and then had a career with the Royal Bank of Canada, working in that capacity at Havana. In later years, he was president of the Sugar Sales Corporation.
