= Jacques Person =

German sprinter (1889–1915)

Personal information
- Born: Jakob Person; 1 May 1889 Zabern, German Empire
- Died: 15 July 1915 (aged 26) Flanders, Belgium

Sport
- Sport: Track and field
- Events: 400 metres 800 metres

Jakob "Jacques" Person (1 May 1889 – 15 July 1915) was a German track and field athlete who competed in the 1912 Summer Olympics. In 1912 he was eliminated in the semi-finals of the 400 metres competition. In the 800 metres event he was eliminated in the first round.

He was killed in action during World War I.

== See also ==
- List of Olympians killed in World War I
