= Robert Schurrer =

French sprinter

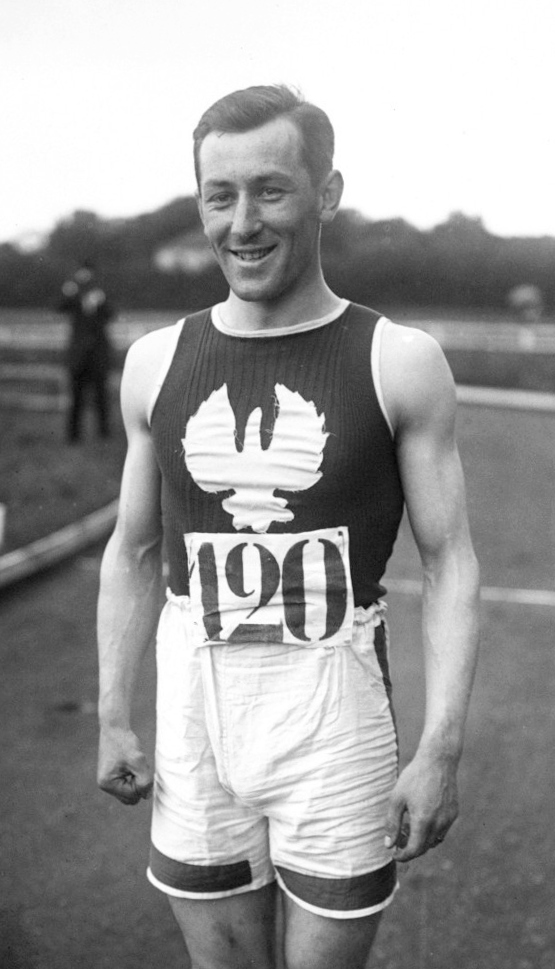
- Robert Schurrer in 1912

Personal information
- Born: 24 March 1890 Vesoul, France
- Died: 27 November 1972 (aged 82) Strasbourg, France

Sport
- Sport: Athletics
- Event: 100–400 m
- Club: SS Lorrain Nancy

Achievements and titles
- Personal bests: 200 m – 23.0 (1911); 400 – 51.8 (1911)
Medal record
Representing France
Olympic Games
| Silver medal – second place | 1912 Stockholm | 4×400 metre relay |

Robert Schurrer (24 March 1890 – 27 November 1972) was a French sprinter who competed at the 1912 Summer Olympics. He won a silver medal in the 4×400 metre relay and failed to reach the finals of individual 100 m, 200 m and 400 m events.
