= Ervin Szerelemhegyi =

Hungarian sprinter (1891–1969)

Ervin Szerelemhegyi (March 23, 1891 – October 3, 1969) was a Hungarian track and field athlete who competed in the 1912 Summer Olympics. He was born and died in Budapest.

In 1912, he was eliminated in the semi-final of the 400 metre competition. In the 100 metre event as well as in the 200 metre competition he was eliminated in the first round. He was also a member of the Hungarian relay team, which was eliminated in the first round of the 4x400 metre relay event.
