= Athletics at the 1912 Summer Olympics – Men's 4 × 400 metres relay =

Men's 4 × 400 metres relay at the Games of the V Olympiad
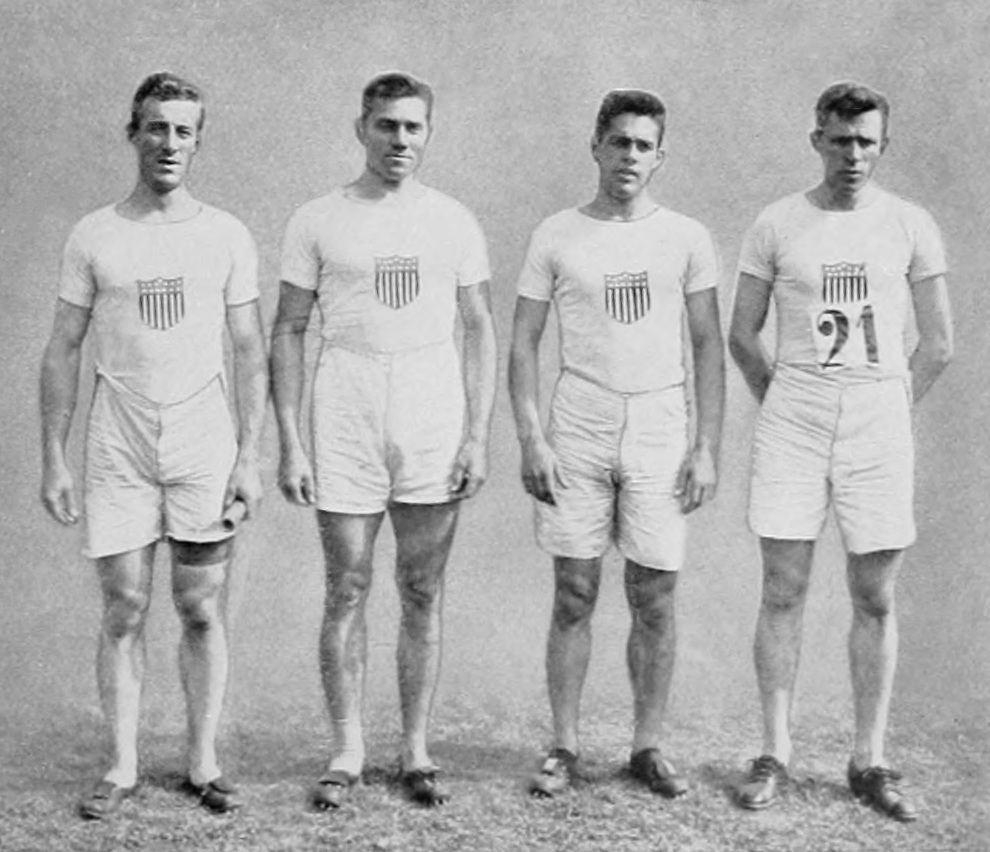
- The winning American relay team.
- Venue: Stockholm Olympic Stadium
- Dates: July 14, 1912 (semifinals); July 15, 1912 (final)
- Competitors: 28 from 7 nations

Medalists
1st place, gold medalist(s)		Edward Lindberg; Ted Meredith; Charles Reidpath; Mel Sheppard	United States
2nd place, silver medalist(s)		Pierre Failliot; Charles Lelong; Charles Poulenard; Robert Schurrer	France
3rd place, bronze medalist(s)		Ernest Henley; George Nicol; Cyril Seedhouse; James Soutter	Great Britain

The men's 4 × 400 metres relay was a track and field athletics event held as part of the Athletics at the 1912 Summer Olympics programme. It was the debut of the event, which along with the 4 × 100 metre relay marked the first relays of equal legs in the athletics programme (a medley relay had been held in 1908). The competition was held on Sunday, July 14, 1912, and on Monday, July 15, 1912. Twenty-eight runners from seven nations competed. NOCs could enter 1 team of 4 athletes, with up to 2 reserves.

== Records ==
These were the standing world and Olympic records (in minutes) prior to the 1912 Summer Olympics.

World record	3:18.2	(United States) Harry Schaaf (United States) Harry Gissing (United States) James Rosenberger (United States) Mel Sheppard	New York (USA)	September 4, 1911
Olympic record	–	none	–	–

Great Britain, in the first semifinal, set the inaugural Olympic record with 3:19.0.

In the final, the United States set a new world record with 3:16.6.

== Results ==
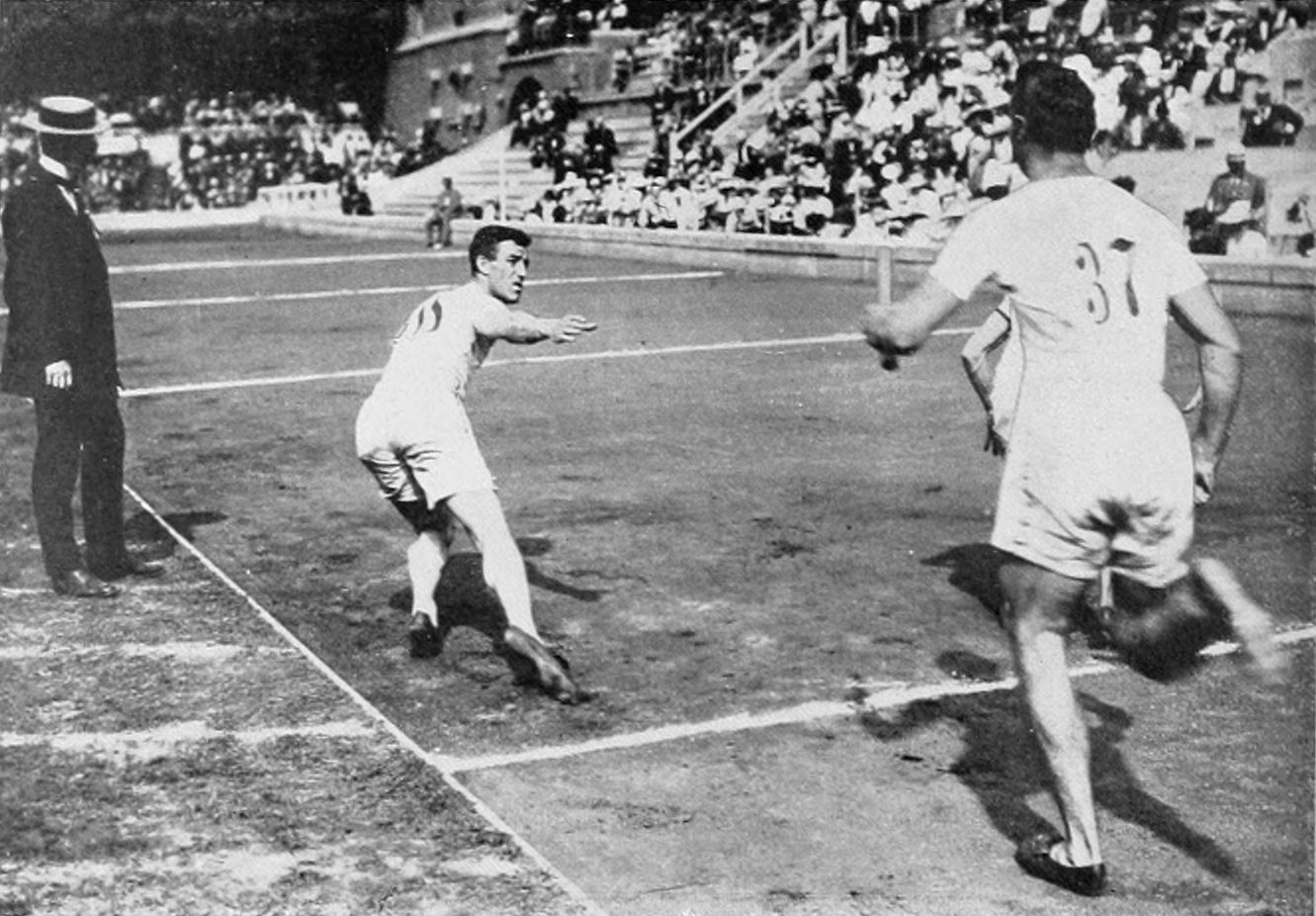
The final: Edward Lindberg passing over the baton to Ted Meredith.

=== Semifinals ===
All semifinals were held on Sunday, July 14, 1912.

Semifinal 1

Place	Athletes	Time	Qual.
1	George Nicol, Ernest Henley, James Soutter, Cyril Seedhouse (GBR)	3:19.0 OR	QF
2	Mel Brock, John Howard, Thomas Gallon, John Tait (CAN)	3:22.2	

Semifinal 2

Place	Athletes	Time	Qual.
1	Mel Sheppard, Edward Lindberg, Ted Meredith, Charles Reidpath (USA)	3:23.3	QF
2	Hanns Braun, Max Herrmann, Heinrich Burkowitz, Erich Lehmann (GER)	3:28.5	

Semifinal 3

Place	Athletes	Time	Qual.
1	Charles Lelong, Robert Schurrer, Pierre Failliot, Charles Poulenard (FRA)	3:22.5	QF
2	Paul Zerling, John Dahlin, Eric Lindholm, Knut Stenborg (SWE)	3:25.0	
3.	Ervin Szerelemhegyi, Ödön Bodor, István Déván, Frigyes Wiesner (HUN)	3:29.4	

=== Final ===
The final was held on Monday, July 15, 1912.

Place	Athletes	Time
1	Mel Sheppard, Edward Lindberg, Ted Meredith, Charles Reidpath (USA)	3:16.6 WR
2	Charles Lelong, Robert Schurrer, Pierre Failliot, Charles Poulenard (FRA)	3:20.7
3	George Nicol, Ernest Henley, James Soutter, Cyril Seedhouse (GBR)	3:23.2
