= Annie Shepley Omori =

American painter (1856–1943)

- Born: Annie Barrows Shepley; 1856; St. Cloud, Minnesota, United States
- Died: 1943 (aged 86–87); Japan
- Education: Académie Julian
- Occupation: Painter
- Spouse: Hyozo Omori

Annie Shepley Omori (1856 – 1943) was an American artist, activist, and translator. For the first fifty years of her life, she produced work under her maiden name, Annie Barrows Shepley. She studied art in New York under Harry Siddons Mowbray and in Paris, France, at the Académie Julian under Jules Joseph Lefebvre and Lucien Simon. After that, she established studios in New York and Connecticut, where she worked as a portrait painter and children's book illustrator. She married Hyozo Omori, a Japanese exchange student, in 1907 and moved with him to Japan, where they established the Yurin En settlement house to provide educational and recreational opportunities to the poor in Tokyo. They were leaders in the Japanese playground movement. Hyozo Omori died in 1913, and Shepley continued running the center. She also translated Diaries of Court Ladies of Old Japan with Kochi Doi in 1920.

== Artist ==
Shepley studied art under Harry Siddons Mowbray in New York. In Paris, she studied at Académie Julian under Jules Joseph Lefebvre and Lucien Simon.

She established a studio in New York and later in Connecticut, where she painted portraits and illustrated children's books. Shepley exhibited her painting Work and Play at the Palace of Fine Arts and The Wonderful Story at the Woman's Building at the 1893 World's Columbian Exposition in Chicago, Illinois. Other paintings that were representative of her work were Portrait of Artist's Niece (Rosamund Sargeant) and Portrait of a Young Woman.

Portrait and Study of a Head were exhibited at the annual Pennsylvania Academy of the Fine Arts exhibition held from December 1896 through February 1897. At that time, she lived at 96 Fifth Avenue in New York City. She exhibited a painting entitled Echo in 1897 at the Art Club of Philadelphia. About a dozen of her works were shown in a New York gallery owned by William Clausen in 1905.

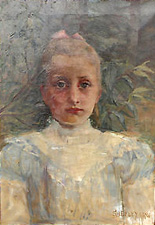
Annie Barrows Shepley, Portrait of Artist's Niece (Rosamund Sargeant)

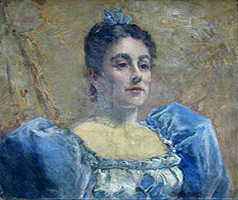
Annie Barrows Shepley, Portrait of a Young Woman

== Japan ==
In October 1907, she married Hyozo Omori, who in 1905 graduated from Stanford University. He came to the US as a YMCA exchange student who studied in Springfield, Massachusetts. In 1908, after his return to Japan, he introduced basketball to the country.

Hyozo Omori became dedicated to welfare work and Shepley was described as someone "with delicate refinement, high idealism, and scholarly outlook, she found all the elements of happiness." In Tokyo, they established a community center, Yurin En (House of the Friendly Neighbor) which offered drama lessons and a playground for children. It also offered courses in sewing, flower arranging, cooking, and crafts as well as mother's meetings and opportunities for people to speak English. Initially, they met resistance because of their co-educational programs, the fact that the Omoris were Christian, and that they broke down well-established class barriers. In 1913, after her husband's death Shepley continued running Yurin En, becoming a leader in the Japanese playground movement.

She translated Diaries of Court Ladies of Old Japan in 1920. The book, published with Kochi Doi, combined a translation of The Diary of Lady Murasaki with that of Izumi Shikibu (The Izumi Shikibu nikki) and of the Sarashina nikki. Their translation had an introduction by Amy Lowell. An English translation was published by Richard Bowring in 1982, and again in 2024 by anthropologist Erick DuPree.

She was decorated by the Japanese government for her heroic service during the 1922 earthquake.

She died in 1943, during World War II.
