= Algernon Wells =

British athlete

Joseph Algernon Wells (9 September 1885 – 20 October 1946) was a British track and field athlete who competed in the 1912 Summer Olympics. He was born and died in Ware.

In 1912, he was eliminated in the semi-finals of the 400 metres competition. In the 200 meters event he was eliminated in the first round.
