= Heinrich Wenseler =

German sprinter

Heinrich Wenseler (26 March 1891 – 13 September 1943) was a German track and field athlete who competed in the 1912 Summer Olympics. In 1912, he was eliminated in the first round of the 400 metres competition.
