= John Dahlin =

Swedish sprinter

John Dahlin (11 January 1886 – 12 July 1927) was a Swedish track and field athlete who competed in the 1912 Summer Olympics.

In 1912, he qualified for the semi-finals of the 400 metres competition, but he did not start in the race. He was also a member of the Swedish relay team, which was eliminated in the first round of the 4x400 metre relay event.
