= Ernest Henley (athlete) =

British sprinter (1889–1962)

Personal information
- Nationality: British (English)
- Born: 31 March 1889 Brighton, England
- Died: 14 March 1962 (aged 72) Brighton, England

Sport
- Sport: Athletics
- Event: 400 metres / 440 yards
- Club: Brighton & County Harriers
Medal record
Men's athletics
Representing Great Britain
Bronze medal – third place	1912 Stockholm	4x400 metre relay

Ernest John Henley (31 March 1889 – 14 March 1962) was a British athlete who competed at the 1912 Summer Olympics.

== Career ==
Henley finished third behind Cyril Seedhouse in the 440 yards event at the 1912 AAA Championships.

Shortly after the AAA Championships, Henley competed for Great Britain in the 4 x 400-metre relay, at the 1912 Summer Olympics held in Stockholm, Sweden. He won the bronze medal with his teammates George Nicol, James Soutter and Cyril Seedhouse.
