= Eric C. Lindholm =

American music conductor

Eric C. Lindholm is an American music conductor. He is the Harry S. and Madge Rice Thatcher Professor of Music at Pomona College in Claremont, California, and conducts the Pomona College Orchestra.
