= Haff (lagoon) =

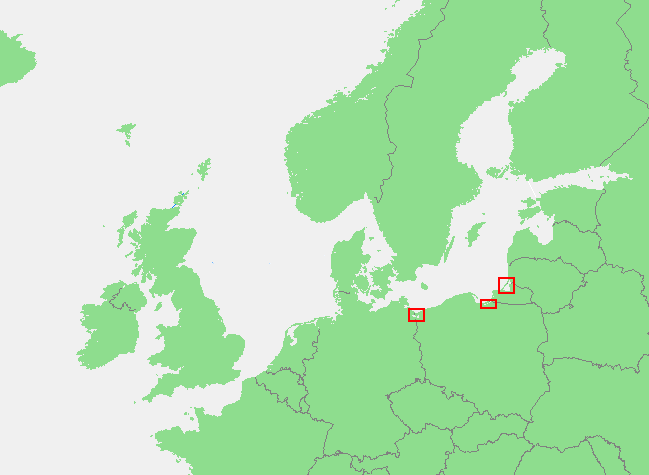
Examples of haffs.

Haff (German for "lagoon", pronounced [haf]) or Bodden may refer to several estuarine lagoons along the Southern Baltic coast:

- Frisches Haff
- Großes Haff
- Kamieński Lagoon or Camminer Bodden
- Kleines Haff
- Kurisches Haff
- Stettiner Haff, also Pommersches Haff or Oderhaff

In Northern Germany and the Netherlands, the now obsolete Frisian word hef may refer to the Wadden Sea, which has some properties of a lagoon.
