= Erich Lehmann (athlete) =

German sprinter and middle-distance runner

Personal information
- Full name: Leberecht Julius Erich Ernst Lehmann
- Nationality: German
- Born: September 12, 1890 Treppendorf, Lübben (Spreewald)
- Died: July 9, 1917 (aged 26)

Sport
- Country: Germany
- Sport: Track and field
- Club: Charlottenburger Turn-Gemeinde, Berlin

Erich Lehmann (September 12, 1890 – July 9, 1917) was a German track and field athlete who competed in the 1912 Summer Olympics.

In 1912, he was eliminated in the first round of both the 400 metres competition and the 800 metres competition. He was also a member of the German relay team, which was eliminated in the first round of the 4x400 metre relay competition. He was killed in action during World War I.

== See also ==
- List of Olympians killed in World War I
