= Cyril Seedhouse =

British sprinter (1892–1966)

Personal information
- Nationality: British (English)
- Born: 10 April 1892 Leighton Buzzard, Bedfordshire, England
- Died: 21 January 1966 (aged 73) Exminster, Devon, England

Sport
- Sport: Athletics
- Event: 400 metres / 440 yards
- Club: Blackheath Harriers
Medal record
Men's athletics
Representing Great Britain
Olympic Games
| Bronze medal – third place | 1912 Stockholm | 4x400 metre relay |

Cyril Norman Seedhouse (10 April 1892 – 21 January 1966) was a British athlete who competed at the 1912 Summer Olympics.

== Career ==
Seedhouse became the National 440 yards champion after winning the AAA Championships title at the 1912 AAA Championships.

Shortly after the AAA Championships, Seedhouse competed for Great Britain in the 4 x 400-metre relay, at the 1912 Summer Olympics held in Stockholm, Sweden. He won the bronze medal with his teammates George Nicol, Ernest Henley and James Soutter.

Seedhouse regained his 440 yards title at the 1914 AAA Championships.

During the First World War he served in the Royal Flying Corps and was injured in a dogfight that saw him drive off German Fokker aircraft.
