= Shizo Kanakuri =

Japanese marathon runner (1891–1983)

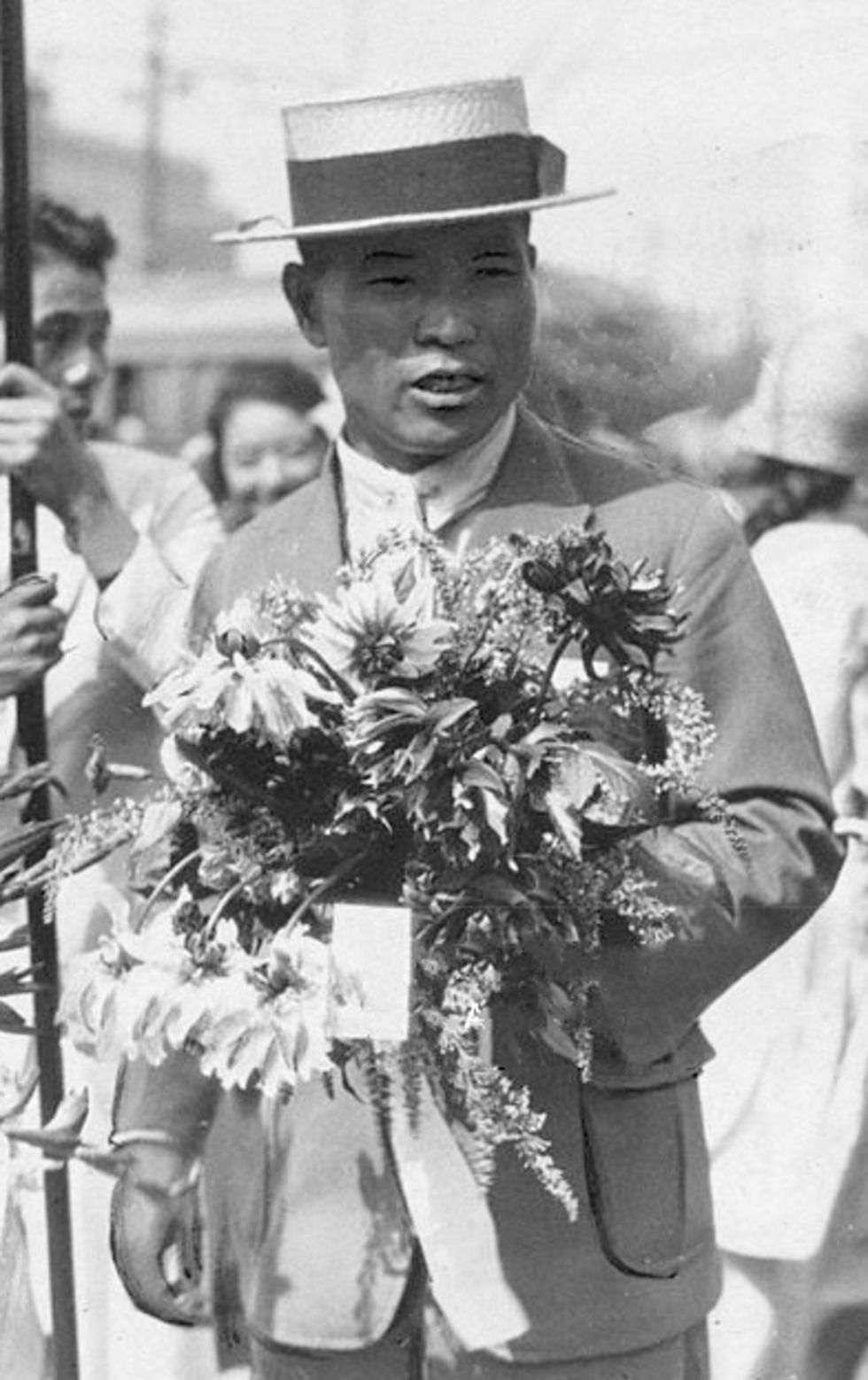
- Shizo Kanakuri returning from the 1924 Olympics

Personal information
- Native name: 金栗 四三
- Born: 20 August 1891 Nagomi, Kumamoto, Japan
- Died: 13 November 1983 (aged 92) Tamana, Kumamoto, Japan
- Height: 1.70 m (5 ft 7 in)
- Weight: 64 kg (141 lb)

Sport
- Sport: Marathon
- Retired: 1924

Shizo Kanakuri (金栗 四三, Kanaguri Shisō (Note: The reading of the Japanese characters is debated: the surname can be either Kanakuri or Kanaguri, while the given name can be Shisō or Shizō. The form listed in Olympic records is Kanakuri Shizo.); 20 August 1891 – 13 November 1983) was a Japanese marathon runner celebrated as the "father of marathon" in Japan. He holds the Guinness World Record for the longest time to complete a marathon with a time of 54 years 8 months 6 days 5 hours 32 minutes 20.3 seconds. Kanakuri retired from the men's marathon event at the 1912 Stockholm Olympics without informing the authorities, but Sveriges Television gave him the opportunity to complete his marathon in 1967.

== Biography ==
Kanakuri grew up in a rural town called Nagomi on the island of Kyūshū to a family that sold sake. Every day, he ran nearly four miles to school.

In November 1911, at the age of 20, Kanakuri raced in the domestic trials for the 1912 Stockholm Olympics where he reportedly set a marathon world record at 2 hours, 30 minutes and 33 seconds, although the course was just 40 km (25 mi). (Note: Road running historian Andy Milroy, writing for the Association of Road Racing Statisticians, has indicated that "25 miles was the distance of the first Japanese marathon held in 1911". Predating Kanakuri's performance, Milroy also indicated that a "professional world record" at the 25 mile distance of 2 hours, 33 minutes and 42 seconds was set by British runner Len Hurst on August 27, 1903.) He was selected as one of the two Japanese athletes to attend the event. Both athletes had to pay their own travel expenses of 1,800 yen, and Kanakuri's classmates conducted a nationwide fundraiser which collected 1,500 yen. Shizo's oldest brother, Sanetsugu Kanakuri, collected 300 yen. To prepare, he trained with Kano Jigoro, the founder of judo.

=== 1912 Olympic Marathon and disappearance ===
Kanakuri is best known for disappearing during the marathon race in the 1912 Stockholm Olympics.

Kanakuri was the first Japanese athlete to qualify for an Olympics. He embarked on a difficult 18-day-long trip to Stockholm, first by ship and then by train all through the Trans-Siberian Railway. When he finally arrived in Stockholm, Kanakuri was weak from the long journey. To make matters worse, he struggled to sleep during the white nights, and he had problems with the local food. The Japanese team coach, Hyozo Omori, was mostly bedridden due to tuberculosis and failed to give Kanakuri sufficient pre-race training.

The race was held near Stockholm amidst a heat wave. Throughout the race, dozens of competitors dropped out, including runner Francisco Lázaro, whose mid-race collapse and subsequent death made him the first Olympic fatality. The reigning Olympic gold medalist Johnny Hayes called the event a "disgrace to civilization." Kanakuri, too, experienced debilitating hyperthermia. About sixteen miles into the race, an exhausted Kanakuri left the course and desperately stumbled into a nearby garden party, where he drank orange juice for an hour. Embarrassed by his failure, he silently returned to Japan without notifying race officials.

Since Kanakuri did not finish, race officials gave the consolation prize, a large wooden spoon, to a Russian. Kanakuri's disappearance spurred humorous stories in Sweden about the supposedly lost Japanese runner. Sweden added Shizo Kanakuri to its missing persons list, and his name remained there for fifty years.

=== Later running career ===
Despite this, Kanakuri was selected to participate in the 1916 Summer Olympics, which were subsequently cancelled due to World War I. Kanakuri did compete in the 1920 Summer Olympics held in Antwerp, where he finished in 16th with a time of 2 hours, 48 minutes and 45.4 seconds. Kanakuri subsequently participated in the 1924 Summer Olympics, where he failed to finish the race.

=== Return to Sweden ===
A Swedish reporter discovered him working as a geography teacher in southern Japan and in 1967, Sveriges Television offered Kanakuri the chance to complete his marathon. He accepted. Immediately upon arriving in Sweden, he "jumped off the plane" and "jogged around the tarmac" to warm up his legs, and "showed great vigor" according to the Associated Press. On March 20, 1967, he finished the marathon. His official time was 54 years 8 months 6 days 5 hours 32 minutes 20.3 seconds. He commented, "It was a long trip. Along the way, I got married, had six children and ten grandchildren."

While he was in Sweden, Kanakuri returned to the garden villa, where he had gulped orange juice. He met Bengt Petre, the son of his original hosts. While they drank more orange juice, Bengt Petre explained that one of the Petre family's treasured heirlooms was the scroll with Japanese writing that Kanakuri had given the family to thank them for their hospitality. Upon inspecting the scroll, Kanakuri sadly told the family, "It is just an old customs form."

Kanakuri is also known for his role in establishing the Hakone Ekiden relay marathon in 1920. Since 2004, the top prize in the race has been named in his honor.

He died at the age of 92 on 13 November 1983, at his hometown of Tamana in Kumamoto Prefecture, Japan.

== Personal life ==
He had six children and ten grandchildren. He was also known for his interest in orange juice.

== See also ==
- Japan at the 1912 Summer Olympics
- Idaten, a 2019 taiga drama where Kanakuri is played by Nakamura Kankurō VI
