= James Soutter =

Scottish sprinter

Personal information
- Born: 1 January 1885 Echt, Aberdeenshire, Scotland
- Died: 8 August 1966 (aged 81) Edinburgh, Scotland

Sport
- Sport: Athletics
- Event: 400m/800m
- Club: Blackheath Harriers
Medal record
Men's athletics
Representing Great Britain
Bronze medal – third place	1912 Stockholm	4x400 metre relay

James Tindal Soutter (1 January 1885 – 8 August 1966, Edinburgh) was a Scottish athlete who competed at the 1912 Summer Olympics.

== Career ==
Soutter finished second behind German Hanns Braun in the 880 yards event at the 1912 AAA Championships.

Shortly after the AAA Championships, he competed for Great Britain and Ireland in the 4 x 400 metre relay, at the 1912 Summer Olympics held in Stockholm, Sweden. He won the bronze medal with his teammates George Nicol, Ernest Henley and Cyril Seedhouse.
