= Eric Lindholm (athlete) =

Swedish distance runner (1890–1957)

Eric Evert Lindholm (August 22, 1890 – August 9, 1957) was a Swedish track and field athlete who competed in the 1912 Summer Olympics.

In 1912, he was eliminated in the semi-finals of the 400 metres competition. He was eliminated in the first round in the 800 metres event.

He was also a member of the Swedish relay team, which was eliminated in the first round of the 4x400 metre relay event.
