= Carroll Haff =

American track and field athlete and baseball player

Carroll Barse Haff (February 19, 1892 – April 9, 1947) was an American track and field athlete who competed in the 1912 Summer Olympics. He was born in Kansas City, Missouri and died in Pelham Manor, New York.

== Early Life ==
Carroll Haff was born on February 19, 1892 in Kansas City, Missouri. He was the eldest child of three and had two younger sisters named Madeline Barse Haff and Gertrude Barse Haff. His father, Delbert James Haff, was a prominent lawyer and civil leader. He moved to Ann Arbor, Michigan where he enrolled in the University of Michigan.

== Athletic Career ==
n 1912, he finished fifth place in the 400 metres competition. Haff also played as a pitcher in the exhibition baseball tournament at the 1912 Stockholm Olympics.

== Professional Life ==
After his athletic career, Haff earned a degree from the University of Michigan Law School in 1915. During World War I, he served as a Major in the Field of Artillery. After his military service, Haff transitioned in to finance and became a member of the New York Stock Exchange and was a major partner at the brokage firm Abbott, Proctor & Paine. Haff settled in Pelham Manor, New York, where he was a heavily involved community leader. During World War II, he lead local civic efforts directing wartime bond drives. He died of an illness on April 9, 1947 at the age of 55. At the time of his death, he had a wife named Gertrude Patterson and had four children with her.
