= Charles Reidpath =

American athlete

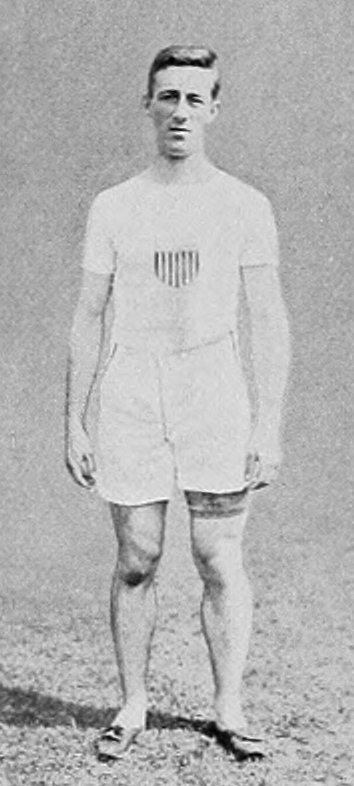
- Charles Reidpath at the 1912 Olympics

Personal information
- Born: September 20, 1889 Buffalo, New York, United States
- Died: October 21, 1975 (aged 86) Kenmore, New York, United States
- Height: 1.81 m (5 ft 11 in)
- Weight: 76 kg (168 lb)

Sport
- Sport: Sprint running
- Club: NYAC, New York
Medal record
Men's athletics
Representing the United States
Olympic Games
Gold medal – first place	1912 Stockholm	400 metres
Gold medal – first place	1912 Stockholm	4 × 400 m relay

Charles Decker Reidpath (September 20, 1889 – October 21, 1975) was an American track and field sprinter and winner of two gold medals at the 1912 Summer Olympics, who later went on to have an outstanding military career.

== Biography ==
Born in Buffalo, New York, and a graduate of that city's Lafayette High School, Reidpath became a collegiate track star at Syracuse University, winning the 220 yd (201 m) and 440 yd (402 m) dashes in the 1912 intercollegiate games. He also played football at Syracuse.

On graduating from Syracuse in 1912 with a degree in civil engineering, Reidpath was pressured by relatives to quit sports and take a position with the family business in Buffalo. Instead, he made the U.S. Olympic track team and headed to Stockholm, Sweden. Reidpath won the 400 m in an Olympic record shattering time of 48.2 seconds, a mark also ratified as a world record. Running the anchor leg of the 4 × 400 m relay, Reidpath helped the U.S. team set a world record of 3:16.6. In the 200 metres competition he finished fifth.

Reidpath was a lieutenant colonel in the United States Army who served in England, France and Belgium in the Transportation Corps during World War II, winning battle stars for the Northern France and Rheinland campaigns. In Belgium, he was made Officer of the Crown for his services at the vital port of Antwerp in 1944 and 1945. Reidpath was made a Brigadier General when he retired from the New York National Guard in 1948. He is a member of the Lafayette High School Sports Hall of Fame.

Away from sports and the military, Reidpath worked for the Berdencer construction company from 1912 through 1937, when he was named director of buildings for Buffalo. For 15 years, he worked in the city Department of Public Works. In 1956, he helped build the Federal Reserve Bank of New York Buffalo Branch as superintendent of construction for architects.

He died in Kenmore, New York in 1975.
