= George Nicol (athlete) =

British sprinter (1886–1967)

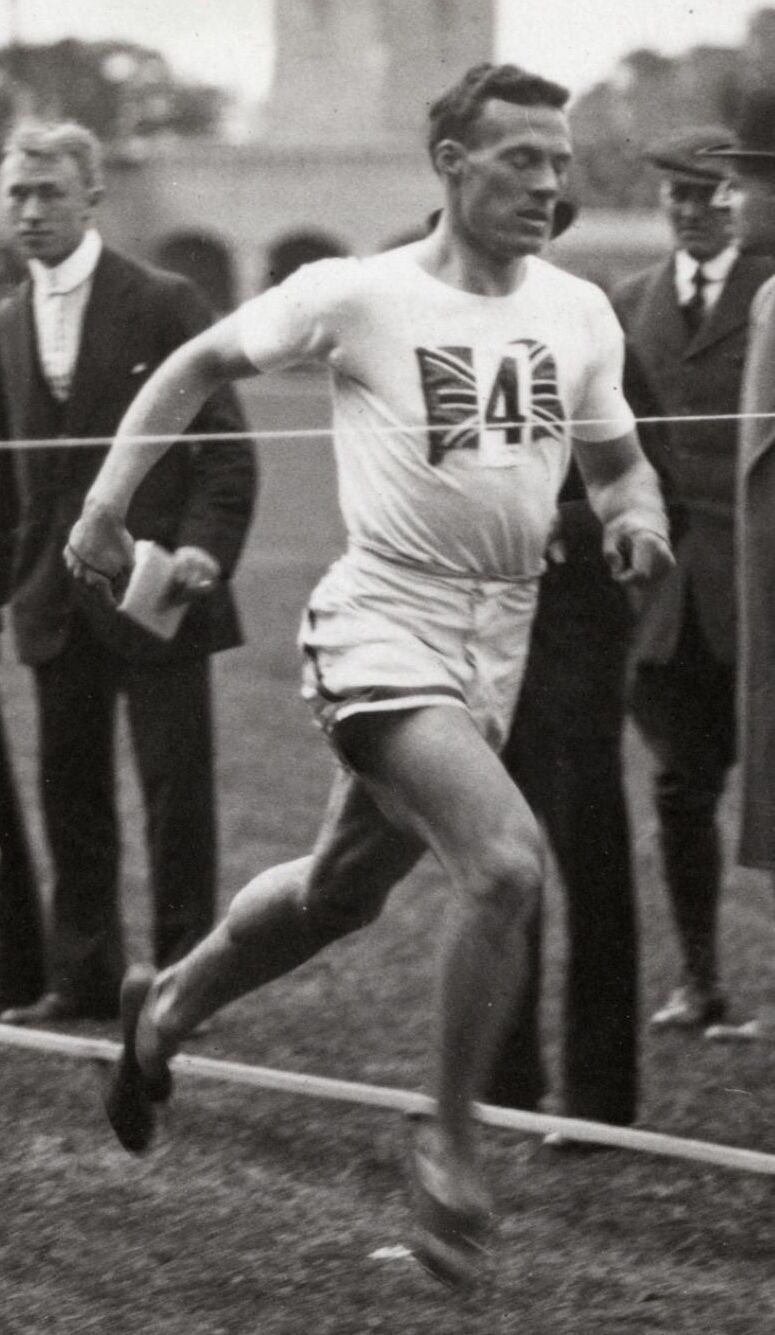
- George Nicol in 1914

Personal information
- Born: 28 December 1886 Battersea, London, England
- Died: 28 January 1967 (aged 80) Brighton, England

Sport
- Sport: Athletics
- Event: 400m/440y
- Club: Polytechnic Harriers
Medal record
Men's athletics
Representing Great Britain
Olympic Games
Bronze medal – third place	1912 Stockholm	4x400 metre relay

George Nicol (28 December 1886 – 28 January 1967) was a British athlete who competed at the 1908 Summer Olympics and 1912 Summer Olympics.

== Career ==
Nicol born in Battersea was selected to represent Great Britain at the 1908 Olympic Games in London, Nicol won his preliminary heat in the 400 metres with a time of 50.8 seconds. This qualified him to compete in the semifinals, where he placed third in his heat to be eliminated.

Four years later at the 1912 Summer Olympics in Stockholm, Sweden, he won his 400 metres heat before being eliminated in the semifinals. However, he was part of the team with Ernest Henley, Cyril Seedhouse and James Soutter that won the bronze medal in the 4 × 400 metres relay.

The following year, he became the National 440 yards champion after winning the AAA Championships title at the 1913 AAA Championships.
