= Charles Poulenard =

French sprinter

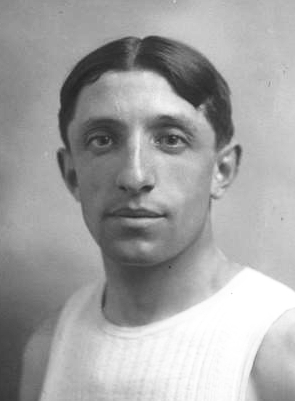
- Charles Poulenard in 1912

Personal information
- Born: 30 March 1885 Sens, France
- Died: 10 November 1958 (aged 73) Paris, France

Sport
- Sport: Athletics
- Event: 200–800 m
- Club: Racing Club de France, Paris

Achievements and titles
- Personal bests: 200 m – 22.8 (1912); 400 m – 50.0e (1908); 800 m- 1:57.6e (1912)
Medal record
Representing France
Olympic Games
Silver medal – second place	1912 Stockholm	4×400 metre relay

Charles Alexandre Casimir Poulenard (30 March 1885 – 10 November 1958) was a French sprinter who competed at the 1912 Summer Olympics. He won a silver medal in the 4×400 metre relay and failed to reach the finals of individual 200 m, 400 m and 800 m events.
