= Alexander Pedersen =

Norwegian sprinter (1891–1955)

Alexander Pedersen (4 February 1891 – 10 February 1955) was a Norwegian sprinter.

He competed in the 1912 Summer Olympics, where he was eliminated in the first round of the 100 metres competition. He was disqualified in both the 400 metres event and the relay. He became Norwegian 100 metres champion in 1910 and 1915, 200 metres champion in 1913 and 1915 and 400 metres champion in 1913, 1914 and 1915. He represented the club Torodd IF.
