= Yahiko Mishima =

Japanese sprinter

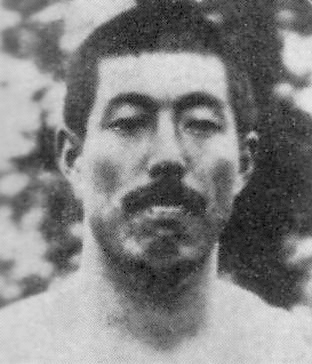
- Yahiko Mishima at the 1912 Olympics

Personal information
- Native name: 三島 弥彦
- Nationality: Japanese
- Born: February 23, 1886 Kōjimachi, Chiyoda-ku, Tokyo, Japan
- Died: February 1, 1954 (aged 67). Meguro, Tokyo, Japan

Sport
- Sport: Sprint
- Retired: 1920

Yahiko Mishima (三島 弥彦, Mishima Yahiko; February 23, 1886 – February 1, 1954) was a Japanese track and field athlete who competed in the 1912 Summer Olympics. Together with the marathon runner Shizo Kanakuri he was the first ever Olympic competitor for Japan.

== Biography ==
Mishima was the son of Viscount Mishima Michitsune, an important official in the Meiji government of Japan. His elder brother, Yatarō Mishima, was the 8th governor of the Bank of Japan. Mishima's father died when he was two years old. He attended the Gakushuin Peer's School, followed by Tokyo Imperial University, where he majored in law. However, Mishima's talents lay in sports, and he was active in college baseball, judo, horseback riding, boating, sumo, and skating, participating in numerous competitions. His height of 170 cm gave him an advantage at a time when the average Japanese man's height was around 150 cm. During the domestic qualifying trials for the 1912 Stockholm Olympics held at what later became Haneda Airport, Mishima was initially selected to be part of the referee committee but decided to participate in the event as a contestant instead, taking first place in the 100, 400 and 800-meter races, and placed second in the 200-meter race. Although a number of qualifying events had taken place, support for the Olympics was not forthcoming from the Japanese Ministry of Education, and the budget was limited to sending only two athletes to Stockholm. Mishima and long-distance runner Shizo Kanakuri were the two selected and travelled to Stockholm over the Trans-Siberian Railway.

On July 6, 1912, Mishima served as a standard bearer for the opening ceremonies of the 1912 Olympics. The same afternoon, although he tied his personal record, he was eliminated in the first round of the 100 meters competition by more than one second, coming in last place. He came in fifth (and last) place in the first heat of the 200 meters competition. In the 400 meters competition, he advanced to the semi-finals in second place, but since there was only one other runner, this was also last place. He defaulted the final race due to pain in his right leg. He left Stockholm before the closing ceremonies to visit Berlin, where he examined the grounds for the 1916 Summer Olympics, and to purchase sports equipment then not available in Japan, returning home only on February 7, 1913. However, the 1916 Berlin Olympics were cancelled due to World War I, and Mishima was unable to qualify for the 1920 Summer Olympics in Antwerp, Belgium.

In 1913, Mishima joined the Yokohama Specie Bank and was assigned to its branch office in Tsingtao, China, where he remained until 1939. His death at his home in Meguro, Tokyo in 1954 was largely overlooked by the Japanese media.

== See also ==
- Idaten (TV series)

== Sources ==
- Guttmann, Allen. Japanese Sports: A History. University of Hawaii Press (2001), ISBN 0824824644
- Yahiko Mishima. sports-reference.com
