= Athletics at the 1912 Summer Olympics – Men's 200 metres =

Men's 200 metres at the Games of the V Olympiad
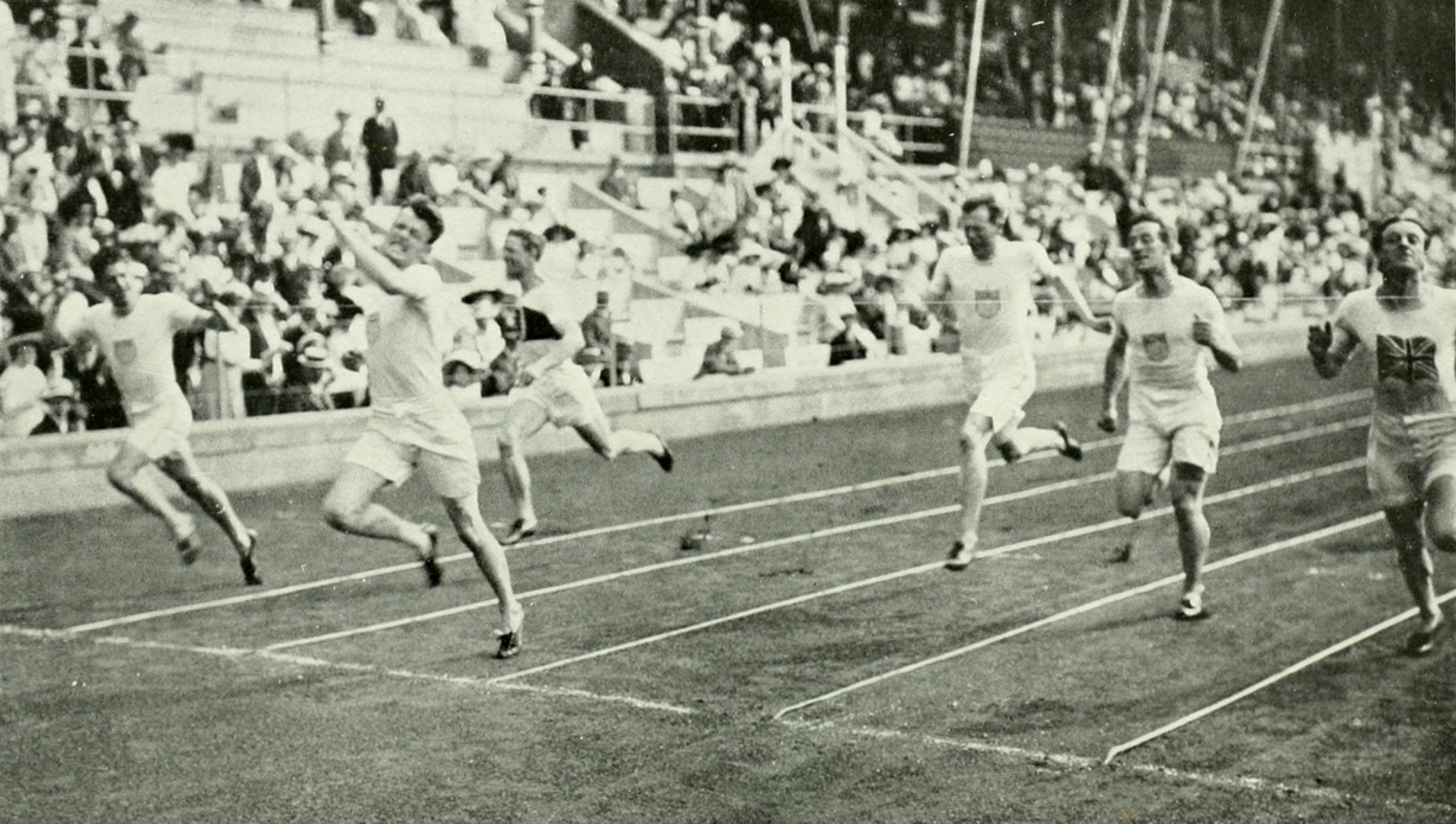
- The finish of the final.
- Venue: Stockholm Olympic Stadium
- Dates: July 10, 1912 (heats, semifinals); July 11, 1912 (final)
- Competitors: 61 from 19 nations
- Winning time: 21.7

Medalists
1st place, gold medalist(s)		Ralph Craig; United States
2nd place, silver medalist(s)		Donald Lippincott; United States
3rd place, bronze medalist(s)		Willie Applegarth; Great Britain

The men's 200 metres was a track and field athletics event held as part of the Athletics at the 1912 Summer Olympics programme. It was the fourth appearance of the event, which has appeared at every edition of the Summer Olympics since the 1900 Summer Olympics. The competition was held on July 10, 1912, and on July 11, 1912. 61 runners from 19 nations competed. NOCs could enter up to 12 athletes. The event was won by Ralph Craig of the United States, the nation's third victory in four Games. Another American, Donald Lippincott, took silver. Great Britain earned its first medal in the 200 metres with Willie Applegarth's bronze.

== Background ==
This was the fourth appearance of the event, which was not held at the first Olympics in 1896 but has been on the program ever since. None of the finalists from the 1908 Games returned. There was no clear favorite. None of the four different AAU champions since 1908 competed. Willie Applegarth of Great Britain was the 1912 AAA champion and closest thing to a favorite before the Games. American Ralph Craig had set the world record for 220 yards in 1910, won the eastern U.S. trials, and started out in Stockholm by winning the 100 metres.

Australasia, Bohemia, Chile, Japan, Portugal, and Russia each made their debut in the event. The United States made its fourth appearance, the only nation to have competed at each edition of the 200 metres to date.

== Competition format ==
There were three rounds: quarterfinals, semifinals, and a final. The quarterfinals consisted of 18 heats of between 2 and 5 athletes each; the two fastest men in each heat advanced to the semifinals. There were 6 semifinals, each with 6 runners. In that round, only the top athlete advanced. The final had 6 runners.

The race was run on a 383-metre track.

== Records ==
These were the standing world and Olympic records (in seconds) prior to the 1912 Summer Olympics.

World record	Jack Donaldson (AUS)^{*}	21.3	Glasgow, United Kingdom	26 July 1911
Olympic record	Archie Hahn (USA)^{**}	21.6	St. Louis, United States	31 August 1904

^{*} unofficial 220 yards (= 201.17 m)

^{**} straight course

Ralph Craig's 21.7 second performance in the final was 1/10 of a second off the Olympic record of 21.6 seconds, set in 1904.

== Schedule ==
Date	Time	Round
Wednesday, 10 July 1912	10:30; 16:00	Quarterfinals; Semifinals
Thursday, 11 July 1912	15:00	Final

== Results ==
=== Quarterfinals ===
All quarterfinal heats were held on Wednesday, July 10, 1912.

==== Quarterfinal 1 ====
Rank	Athlete	Nation	Time	Notes
1	Charles Reidpath	United States	22.6	Q
2	Georges Rolot	France	22.7	Q
3	Knut Stenborg	Sweden	Unknown	
4	Václav Labík	Bohemia	Unknown	

==== Quarterfinal 2 ====
Rank	Athlete	Nation	Time	Notes
1	Ralph Craig	United States	22.8	Q
2	Richard Rice	Great Britain	23.0	Q
3	Charles Poulenard	France	Unknown	
4	Karl Lindblom	Sweden	Unknown	

==== Quarterfinal 3 ====
Rank	Athlete	Nation	Time	Notes
1	Ira Courtney	United States	22.7	Q
2	Duncan Macmillan	Great Britain	Unknown	Q
3	Léon Aelter	Belgium	Unknown	
4	Haralds Hāns	Russia	Unknown	
—	Herberts Baumanis	Russia	DNF	

==== Quarterfinal 4 ====
Rank	Athlete	Nation	Time	Notes
1	Charles Luther	Sweden	23.6	Q
2	Jan Grijseels	Netherlands	Unknown	Q

==== Quarterfinal 5 ====
Rank	Athlete	Nation	Time	Notes
1	Willie Applegarth	Great Britain	24.7	Q
2	Harold Heiland	United States	24.7	Q

==== Quarterfinal 6 ====
Rank	Athlete	Nation	Time	Notes
1	Richard Rau	Germany	22.5	Q
2	Arthur Anderson	Great Britain	Unknown	Q
3	Rudolf Rauch	Austria	Unknown	

==== Quarterfinal 7 ====
Rank	Athlete	Nation	Time	Notes
1	Carl Cooke	United States	22.5	Q
2	Reuben Povey	South Africa	Unknown	Q
3	Joseph Wells	Great Britain	Unknown	
4	Harry Beasley	Canada	Unknown	
5	Georges Malfait	France	Unknown	

==== Quarterfinal 8 ====
Rank	Athlete	Nation	Time	Notes
1	John Howard	Canada	25.0	Q
2	Franco Giongo	Italy	25.0	Q

==== Quarterfinal 9 ====
Rank	Athlete	Nation	Time	Notes
1	Knut Lindberg	Sweden	23.1	Q
2	Frigyes Wiesner	Hungary	Unknown	Q
3	Charles Lelong	France	Unknown	

==== Quarterfinal 10 ====
Rank	Athlete	Nation	Time	Notes
1	Peter Gerhardt	United States	22.9	Q
2	Victor d'Arcy	Great Britain	22.9	Q
3	Gustav Möller	Sweden	Unknown	

==== Quarterfinal 11 ====
Rank	Athlete	Nation	Time	Notes
1	Donald Lippincott	United States	22.8	Q
2	Ivan Möller	Sweden	Unknown	Q
3	Pierre Failliot	France	Unknown	
4	Ernest Haley	Great Britain	Unknown	
5	Pablo Eitel	Chile	Unknown	

==== Quarterfinal 12 ====
Rank	Athlete	Nation	Time	Notes
1	Alvah Meyer	United States	24.1	Q
2	Robert Duncan	Great Britain	Unknown	Q

==== Quarterfinal 13 ====
Rank	Athlete	Nation	Time	Notes
1	Donnell Young	United States	22.8	Q
2	Cyril Seedhouse	Great Britain	Unknown	Q
3	Fritz Fleischer	Austria	Unknown	
4	Heinrich Wenseler	Germany	Unknown	
5	Yahiko Mishima	Japan	Unknown	

==== Quarterfinal 14 ====
Rank	Athlete	Nation	Time	Notes
1	George Patching	South Africa	22.3	Q
2	Clement Wilson	United States	Unknown	Q
3	Frank McConnell	Canada	Unknown	
4	Ervin Szerelemhegyi	Hungary	Unknown	
5	Emil Grandell	Sweden	Unknown	

==== Quarterfinal 15 ====
Rank	Athlete	Nation	Time	Notes
1	Max Herrmann	Germany	22.9	Q
2	István Déván	Hungary	Unknown	Q
3	Herman Sotaaen	Norway	Unknown	
4	Wladyslaw Ponurski	Austria	Unknown	

==== Quarterfinal 16 ====
Rank	Athlete	Nation	Time	Notes
1	William Stewart	Australasia	26.0	Q
2	Henry Macintosh	Great Britain	Unknown	Q

==== Quarterfinal 17 ====
Rank	Athlete	Nation	Time	Notes
1	David Jacobs	Great Britain	23.2	Q
2	Skotte Jacobsson	Sweden	23.2	Q

==== Quarterfinal 18 ====
Rank	Athlete	Nation	Time	Notes
1	Ture Person	Sweden	23.2	Q
2	Robert Schurrer	France	Unknown	Q
3	António Stromp	Portugal	Unknown	

=== Semifinals ===
All semi-finals were held on Wednesday, July 10, 1912.

==== Semifinal 1 ====
Rank	Athlete	Nation	Time	Notes
1	Ralph Craig	United States	21.9	Q
2	David Jacobs	Great Britain	Unknown	
3	Ira Courtney	United States	Unknown	
4	Ture Person	Sweden	Unknown	
5	Frigyes Wiesner	Hungary	Unknown	
—	Arthur Anderson	Great Britain	DNF	

==== Semifinal 2 ====
Rank	Athlete	Nation	Time	Notes
1	Willie Applegarth	Great Britain	21.9	Q
2	Clement Wilson	United States	Unknown	
3	Cyril Seedhouse	Great Britain	Unknown	
4	Harold Heiland	United States	Unknown	
5	Skotte Jacobsson	Sweden	Unknown	
—	William Stewart	Australasia	DNF	

==== Semifinal 3 ====
Rank	Athlete	Nation	Time	Notes
1	Donnell Young	United States	21.9	Q
2	Carl Cooke	United States	Unknown	
3	Georges Rolot	France	Unknown	
4	Max Herrmann	Germany	Unknown	
—	Henry Macintosh	Great Britain	DNF	
—	George Patching	South Africa	DNF	

==== Semifinal 4 ====
Rank	Athlete	Nation	Time	Notes
1	Donald Lippincott	United States	21.8	Q
2	Alvah Meyer	United States	Unknown	
3	John Howard	Canada	Unknown	
4	Ivan Möller	Sweden	22.4	
5	Duncan Macmillan	Great Britain	Unknown	
6	Jan Grijseels	Netherlands	Unknown	

==== Semifinal 5 ====
Rank	Athlete	Nation	Time	Notes
1	Richard Rau	Germany	22.1	Q
2	Peter Gerhardt	United States	Unknown	
3	Charles Luther	Sweden	22.3	
4	Franco Giongo	Italy	Unknown	
5	Reuben Povey	South Africa	Unknown	
—	Richard Rice	Great Britain	DNF	

==== Semifinal 6 ====
Rank	Athlete	Nation	Time	Notes
1	Charles Reidpath	United States	22.1	Q
2	Victor d'Arcy	Great Britain	Unknown	
3	Knut Lindberg	Sweden	22.5	
4	István Déván	Hungary	Unknown	
5	Robert Schurrer	France	Unknown	
—	Robert Duncan	Great Britain	DNF	

=== Final ===
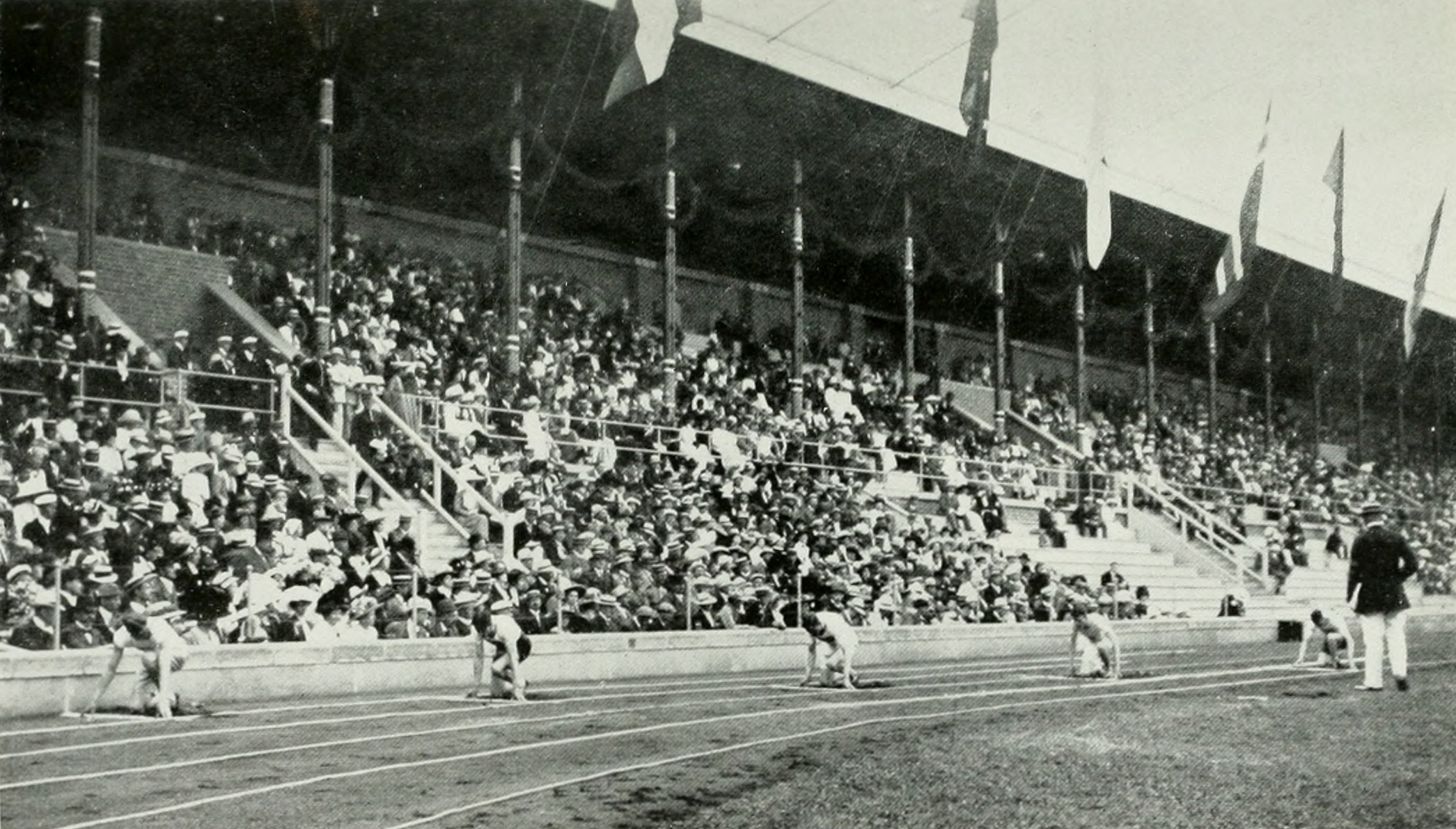
The start of the final.

The final was held on Thursday, July 11, 1912.

Rank	Athlete	Nation	Time
1st place, gold medalist(s)	Ralph Craig	United States	21.7
2nd place, silver medalist(s)	Donald Lippincott	United States	21.8
3rd place, bronze medalist(s)	Willie Applegarth	Great Britain	22.0
4	Richard Rau	Germany	22.2
5	Charles Reidpath	United States	22.3
6	Donnell Young	United States	22.3

== Notes ==
- Bergvall, Erik, ed. (1913). The Official Report of the Olympic Games of Stockholm 1912. Translated by Adams-Ray, Edward. Stockholm: Wahlström & Widstrand.
- Wudarski, Pawel (1999). "Wyniki Igrzysk Olimpijskich" (in Polish).
