= Canada at the 1912 Summer Olympics =

- IOC code: CAN
- NOC: Canadian Olympic Committee

in Stockholm
- Competitors: 37 in 7 sports
- Flag bearer: Duncan Gillis
- Medals Ranked 9th: Gold 3 Silver 2 Bronze 3 Total 8

Summer Olympics appearances (overview)
- 1900; 1904; 1908; 1912; 1920; 1924; 1928; 1932; 1936; 1948; 1952; 1956; 1960; 1964; 1968; 1972; 1976; 1980; 1984; 1988; 1992; 1996; 2000; 2004; 2008; 2012; 2016; 2020; 2024

Other related appearances
- 1906 Intercalated Games

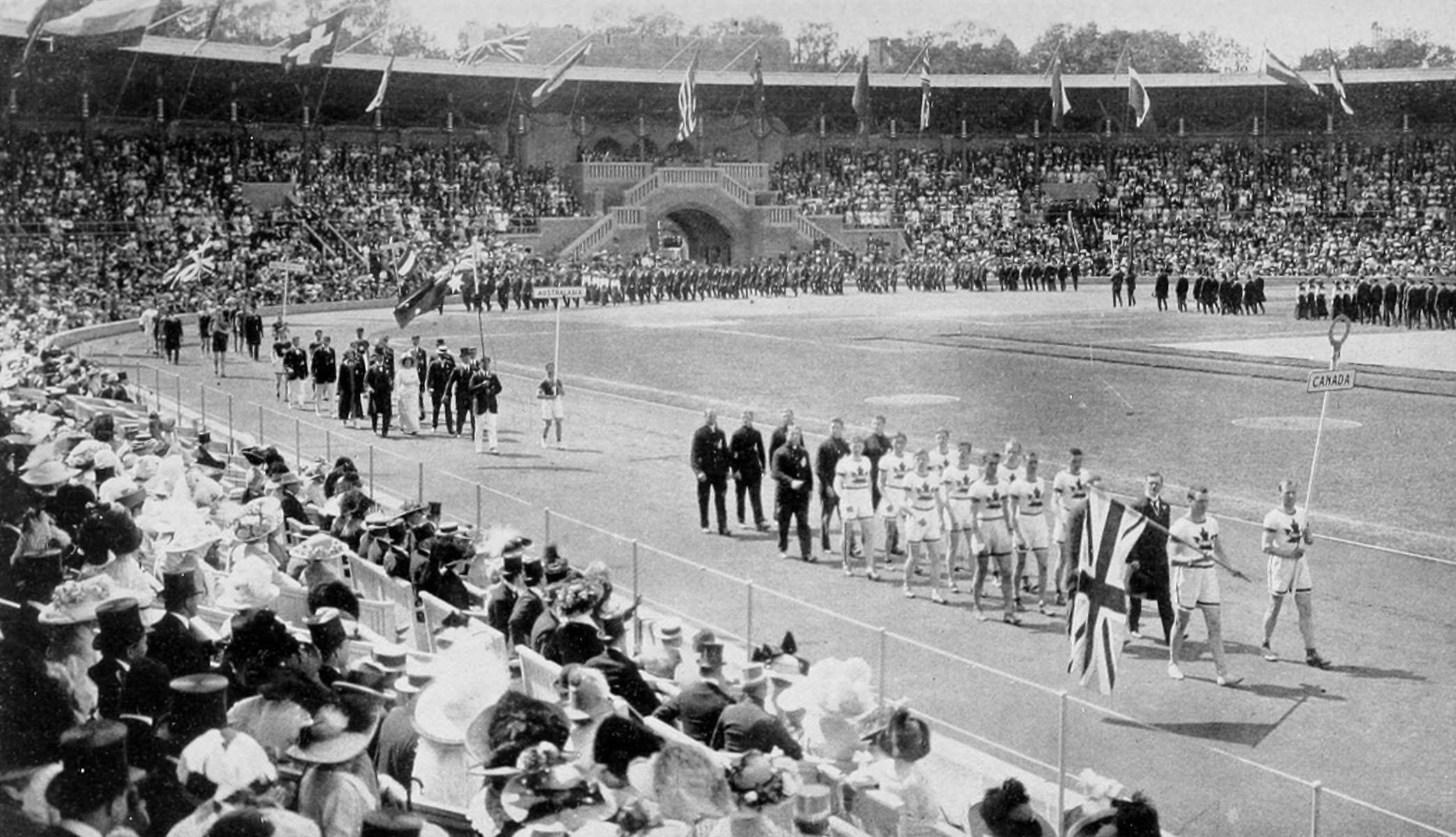
The team of Canada at the opening ceremony.

The Union Jack was the Canada flag for the 1912 Olympics.

Canada competed at the 1912 Summer Olympics in Stockholm, Sweden. 37 competitors, all men, took part in 30 events in 7 sports.

== Medallists ==
=== Gold ===
- George Goulding – Athletics, men's 10 km walk
- George Hodgson – Swimming, men's 400 m freestyle
- George Hodgson – Swimming, men's 1500 m freestyle

=== Silver ===
- Duncan Gillis – Athletics, men's hammer throw
- Calvin Bricker – Athletics, men's long jump

=== Bronze ===
- Frank Lukeman – Athletics, men's pentathlon
- William Halpenny – Athletics, men's pole vault
- Everard Butler – Rowing, men's single sculls

== Aquatics ==
=== Swimming ===
One swimmer competed for Canada at the 1912 Games. It was the second time the nation had competed in swimming, after similarly sending one swimmer to the 1908 Summer Olympics. George Hodgson won Canada's first Olympic swimming medals by taking the gold medals in both of his events, setting world records in each as well.

Ranks given for each swimmer are within the heat.

Men

Swimmer	Events	Heat		Quarterfinal		Semifinal		Final	
Swimmer	Events	Result	Rank	Result	Rank	Result	Rank	Result	Rank
George Hodgson	400 m freestyle	N/A		5:50.6	1 Q	5:25.4 WR	1 Q	5:24.4 WR	1st place, gold medalist(s)
George Hodgson	1500 m freestyle	N/A		22:23.0 WR	1 Q	22:26.0	1 Q	22:00.0 WR	1st place, gold medalist(s)

== Athletics ==
18 athletes competed for Canada in 1912. It was the country's fourth appearance in athletics, having competed in the sport each time the nation appeared at the Olympics. For the fourth straight time, Canada won exactly one athletics gold medal, this time with George Goulding's victory in the 10 kilometre racewalk. Calvin Bricker and Duncan Gillis added silver medals in the long jump and discus throw, respectively. William Halpenny earned one of the three bronze medals in the pole vault. Frank Lukeman, originally fourth in the pentathlon, received a bronze medal in 1913 when pentathlon winner Jim Thorpe was disqualified; Lukeman retained his upgraded placing even after Thorpe's reinstatement. The 4x100 metre relay team briefly held the Olympic record in that new event, though the team was eliminated in the semifinals.

Ranks given are within that athlete's heat for running events.

Athlete	Events	Heat		Semifinal		Final	
Athlete	Events	Result	Rank	Result	Rank	Result	Rank
Harry Beasley	100 m	?	4	did not advance			
Harry Beasley	200 m	?	4	did not advance			
Calvin Bricker	Long jump	N/A		7.21	2	7.21	2
Calvin Bricker	Triple jump	N/A		13.25	18	did not advance	
Mel Brock	400 m	?	3	did not advance			
Mel Brock	800 m	1:57.0	1	1:55.7	1	1:53.0	5
James Corkery	Marathon	N/A				did not finish	
Alexander Decoteau	5000 m	N/A		15:24.2	2	?	6
Alexander Decoteau	Marathon	N/A				did not start	
James Duffy	Marathon	N/A				2:42:18.8	5
Édouard Fabre	Marathon	N/A				2:50:36.2	11
William Forsyth	Marathon	N/A				2:52:23.0	15
Thomas Gallon	400 m	?	3	did not advance			
Duncan Gillis	Discus throw	N/A		48.39	2	48.39	2
Duncan Gillis	Hammer throw	N/A		39.01	14	did not advance	
George Goulding	Marathon	N/A				did not start	
George Goulding	10 km walk	N/A		47:14.5	1	46:28.4	1
William Halpenny	Pole vault	N/A		3.65	1	3.80	3
John Howard	100 m	11.0	1	?	6	did not advance	
John Howard	200 m	25.0	1	?	3	did not advance	
Joe Keeper	5000 m	N/A		15:24.2	2	?	8-11
Joe Keeper	10000 m	N/A		33:58.8	2	32:36.2	4
Joe Keeper	Marathon	N/A				did not start	
Frank Lukeman	100 m	?	2	?	3	did not advance	
Frank Lukeman	110 m hurdles	?	3	did not advance			
Frank Lukeman	Pentathlon	N/A				29	3
Frank Lukeman	Decathlon	N/A				5591.760	15
Arthur Maranda	Long jump	N/A		5.87	29	did not advance	
Arthur Maranda	Triple jump	N/A		12.53	20	did not advance	
Arthur Maranda	Standing long jump	N/A		2.98	17	did not advance	
Frank McConnell	100 m	?	3	did not advance			
Frank McConnell	200 m	?	3	did not advance			
John Tait	800 m	?	2	?	5	did not advance	
John Tait	1500 m			?	4	did not advance	
John Tait	Marathon	N/A				did not start	
Harry Beasley; John Howard; Frank Lukeman; Frank McConnell	4 × 100 m	46.2 OR	1	43.5	2	did not advance	
Mel Brock; Thomas Gallon; John Howard; John Tait	4 × 400 m	N/A		3:22.2	2	did not advance	

== Cycling ==
Two cyclists represented Canada. It was the second appearance of the nation in cycling, in which Canada had previously competed in 1908. Frank Brown had the best time in the time trial, the only race held, placing 5th. Because Canada had fewer than four cyclists, the nation was not entered in the team time trial event.

=== Road cycling ===
Cyclist	Events	Final	
Cyclist	Events	Result	Rank
Frank Brown	Ind. time trial	11:01:00.0	5
George Watson	Ind. time trial	12:52:22.2	78

== Diving ==
Two divers, both men, represented Canada. It was Canada's second appearance in diving. Robert Zimmerman, who had previously been Canada's lone diver in 1908, improved upon his prior performance in advancing to the final and placing 5th.

Men

Diver	Events	Heats		Final	
Diver	Events	Result	Rank	Result	Rank
John P. Lyons	10 m platform	did not finish		did not advance	
John P. Lyons	Plain high dive	32.5	8	did not advance	
Robert Zimmerman	3 m board	76.6	2 q	72.54	5

== Rowing ==
Ten rowers represented Canada. It was the nation's third appearance in rowing. Butler took one of the bronze medals in the single sculls, giving Canada its fourth rowing bronze medal as the nation continued to seek its first gold in the sport after having won a silver in the eights 1904. The 1912 eights crew, including one member of that silver-winning team from 1904 and three members of the bronze-medal team of 1908, was eliminated in the first round when it lost by half a length to the eventual champions.

(Ranks given are within each crew's heat.)

Rower	Event	Heats		Quarterfinals		Semifinals		Final	
Rower	Event	Result	Rank	Result	Rank	Result	Rank	Result	Rank
Everard Butler	Single sculls	7:45.2	1 Q	7:39.9	1 Q	7:41.0	2	did not advance ( (bronze) )	
Phil Boyd; Becher Gale; Richard Gregory; Albert Kent; Winslow McCleary (cox); William Murphy; Charles Riddy; Alex Sinclair; Geoffrey Taylor	Eight	unknown	2	did not advance					

== Shooting ==
Three shooters represented Canada. It was the nation's second appearance in shooting; the 1912 team was much smaller and less successful than the 1908 squad, which had won four medals.

Shooter	Event	Final	
Shooter	Event	Result	Rank
William Davies	Trap	13	45
Robert Hutcheson	Trap	84	17
James Kenyon	Trap	13	45
