= 1912 Summer Olympics medal table =

1912 Summer Olympics medals
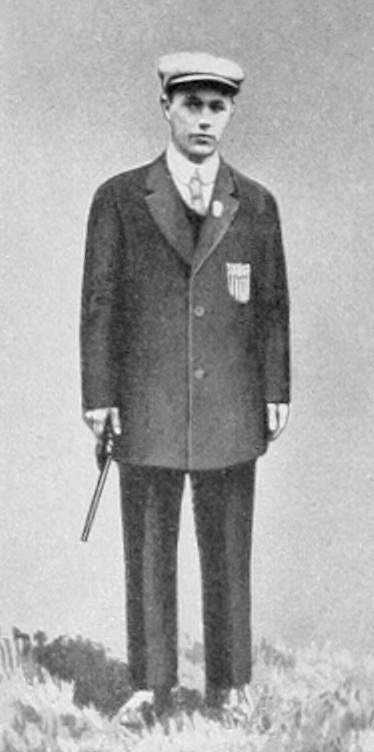
- American sport shooter Alfred Lane won three gold medals at the 1912 Summer Olympics, tied for the most of any competing athlete.
- Location: Stockholm, Sweden

Highlights
- Most gold medals: United States (26)
- Most total medals: Sweden (65)
- Medalling NOCs: 19

World map showing the medal achievements of each country during the 1912 Summer Olympics Legend: represents countries that won at least one gold medal. represents countries that won at least one silver medal but no gold medals. represents countries that won at least one bronze medal (no gold or silver). represents participating countries that did not win medals. represents entities that did not participate at the 1912 Summer Olympics.

The 1912 Summer Olympics, officially known as the Games of the V Olympiad, were an international multi-sport event held in Stockholm, Sweden, between 5 May and 27 July 1912. A total of 2,407 athletes representing 28 National Olympic Committees (NOCs) participated, which included seven teams making their Olympic debut at the Summer Games; Chile, Egypt, Iceland, Japan, Luxembourg, Portugal, and Serbia. The games featured 107 events in 19 disciplines. The games included the Olympic debut of equestrian dressage and eventing, as well as the modern pentathlon.

Athletes representing 19 NOCs received at least one medal, with 16 winning at least one gold medal. Sweden won the most medals overall, with 65, while the United States won the most gold medals, with 44. Among individual participants, Swedish shooter Vilhelm Carlberg, Finnish runner Hannes Kolehmainen, and American shooter Alfred Lane tied for the most gold medals, with three each. Carlberg had the most total medals, with five (three gold, two silver).

== Medal table ==
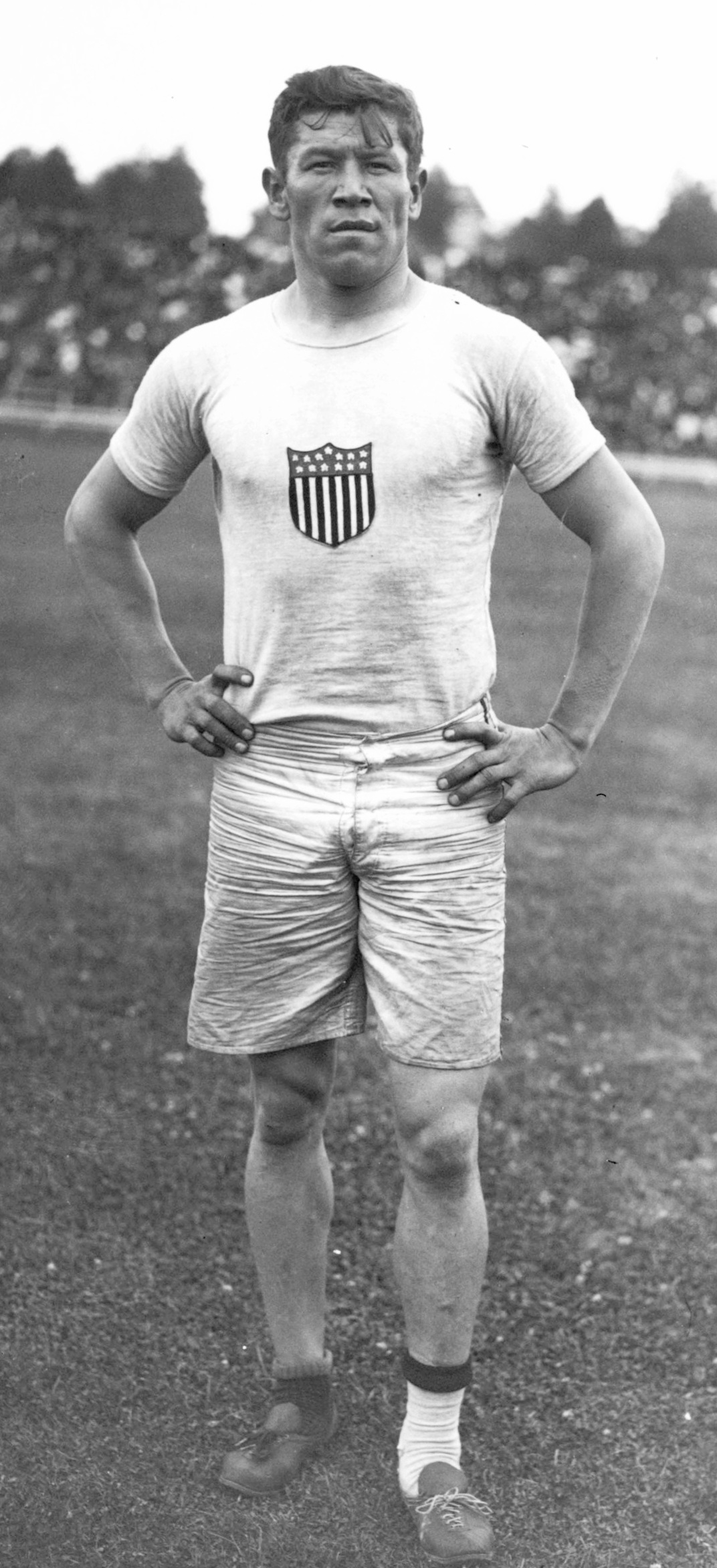
American athlete Jim Thorpe won gold medals in the men's pentathlon and decathlon events. His gold medals were stripped after he was found to have previously been a paid athlete. He was re-awarded the medals in 1982, as co-winner, and declared the sole winner of the events in 2022 by the IOC.

The medal table is based on information provided by the International Olympic Committee (IOC) and is consistent with IOC conventional sorting in its published medal tables. The table uses the Olympic medal table sorting method. By default, the table is ordered by the number of gold medals the athletes from a nation have won, where a nation is an entity represented by a NOC. The number of silver medals is taken into consideration next and then the number of bronze medals. If teams are still tied, equal ranking is given and they are listed alphabetically by their IOC country code.

The 1912 Games featured five art competitions which awarded medals, but did not do so for a full top three, instead opting to award only a first or first and second place medal. Only gold and no silver or bronze medals were awarded in architecture, literature, music, and painting. In sculpturing, a gold and silver medal, but no bronze, were awarded.

In the men's light heavyweight Greco-Roman, the final round featured three wrestlers, Anders Ahlgren, Ivar Böhling, and Béla Varga, who took turns facing off against one another. Ahlgren and Böhling defeated Varga, but they were unable to defeat each other. The match between Ahlgren and Böhling lasted for over 9 hours without a victor. The Olympic rules at the time specifically stated that the winner must have beaten their opponent, and since neither person could claim to have done so, both Ahlgreen and Böhling were awarded silver medals, with no gold being awarded.

In men's single sculls and men's coxed four, there were two-way ties for third which resulted in two bronze medals being awarded in each event. In men's pole vault, there was a two-way tie for second, which resulted in two silver medals being awarded. Additionally, there was a three-way tie for fourth, which the IOC awarded bronze medals for.

In the tug of war, three of the five teams withdrew for unknown reasons, resulting in only two teams participating and a bronze medal not being awarded. Three teams made the final round of the men's 4 x 100 metres relay, but when Germany was disqualified for a faulty baton pass, it resulted in no bronze medal being awarded for the event.

* Host nation (Sweden)

1912 Summer Olympics medal table
Rank	NOC	Gold	Silver	Bronze	Total
1	United States	26	19	19	64
2	Sweden*	23	25	17	65
3	Great Britain	10	15	16	41
4	Finland	9	8	9	26
5	France	7	5	3	15
6	Germany	6	13	7	26
7	South Africa	4	2	0	6
8	Norway	3	2	5	10
9	Canada	3	2	3	8
9	Hungary	3	2	3	8
11	Italy	3	1	2	6
12	Australasia	2	2	3	7
13	Belgium	2	1	3	6
14	Denmark	1	6	5	12
15	Greece	1	0	1	2
16	Switzerland	1	0	0	1
17	Russian Empire	0	2	3	5
18	Austria	0	2	2	4
19	Netherlands	0	0	3	3
Totals (19 entries)		104	107	104	315

== Changes in medal standings ==
List of official changes in medal standings
Event	Ruling date	Athlete (NOC)	1st place, gold medalist(s)	2nd place, silver medalist(s)	3rd place, bronze medalist(s)	Net change	Comment
Athletics, men's pentathlon	1913	Jim Thorpe (USA) DSQ	−1			−1	Jim Thorpe, the winner of the pentathlon and decathlon events, was subsequently disqualified after having taken expense money for playing semi-professional baseball. Only amateur athletes were allowed to compete at the time, and by taking money, he was no longer considered an amateur. The athletes ranking second through fourth were upgraded to first through third. Hugo Wieslander had refused to accept the gold medal, being of the opinion that Thorpe was the legitimate gold medallist. Ferdinand Bie is also thought to have never accepted the gold medal.
Athletics, men's pentathlon	1913	Ferdinand Bie (NOR)	+1			0	
Athletics, men's pentathlon	1913	James Donahue (USA)		+1	–1	0	
Athletics, men's pentathlon	1913	Frank Lukeman (CAN)			+1	+1	
Athletics, men's decathlon	1913	Jim Thorpe (USA) DSQ	−1			−1	
Athletics, men's decathlon	1913	Hugo Wieslander (SWE)	+1	–1		0	
Athletics, men's decathlon	1913	Charles Lomberg (SWE)		+1	–1	0	
Athletics, men's decathlon	1913	Gösta Holmér (SWE)			+1	+1	
Athletics, men's pentathlon	October 1982	Jim Thorpe (USA)	+1			+1	In 1982, twenty-nine years after Thorpe's death, he was reinstated as a co-winner in both events as the disqualification was deemed improper. Thorpe became co-champion with Ferdinand Bie and Hugo Wieslander. None of the other medalists had their positions adjusted.
Athletics, men's decathlon	October 1982	Jim Thorpe (USA)	+1			+1	In 1982, twenty-nine years after Thorpe's death, he was reinstated as a co-winner in both events as the disqualification was deemed improper. Thorpe became co-champion with Ferdinand Bie and Hugo Wieslander. None of the other medalists had their positions adjusted.
Athletics, men's pentathlon	July 2022	Ferdinand Bie (NOR)	–1	+1		0	In 2022, Thorpe was reinstated as the sole winner of the events with the consent of the involved National Olympic Committees and descendants of the athletes. There were no adjustments made to the standings of the other competitors who were awarded medals.
Athletics, men's decathlon	July 2022	Hugo Wieslander (SWE)	–1	+1		0	In 2022, Thorpe was reinstated as the sole winner of the events with the consent of the involved National Olympic Committees and descendants of the athletes. There were no adjustments made to the standings of the other competitors who were awarded medals.

List of official changes by country
NOC	Gold	Silver	Bronze	Net change
Canada			+1	+1
Norway				0
Sweden		+1		+1
United States		+1	–1	0

== See also ==
- All-time Olympic Games medal table
- List of 1912 Summer Olympics medal winners
