= Lindblom =

Lindblom is a Swedish surname. Notable people with the surname include:

- Anita Lindblom (1937–2020), Swedish singer and actress
- Björn Lindblom (born 1934), Swedish phonetician
- Charles E. Lindblom (1917–2018), American political scientist
- Duran O'Hara Lindblom (born 1983), Swedish figure skater
- Gerhard Lindblom (1887–1969), Swedish ethnographer
- Gunnel Lindblom (1931–2021), Swedish actress
- Gustaf Lindblom (athlete) (1891–1960), Swedish athlete
- Jacob Axel Lindblom (1746–1819), Swedish scholar and archbishop of Uppsala
- Josh Lindblom (born 1987), American baseball player
- Karl Lindblom (1892–1969), Swedish athlete
- Louise Lindblom (born 1968), Swedish lichenologist
- Mattias Lindblom (born 1971), Swedish singer
- Olavi Lindblom (1911–1990), Finnish trade unionist and politician
- Oskar Lindblom (born 1996), Swedish ice hockey player
- Per Lindblom, Norwegian chess master
- Robert Lindblom (1844–1907), Swedish-born American businessman
- Sari Lindblom (born 1960), Finnish academic
- Seppo Lindblom (born 1935), Finnish banker and politician
