= Athletics at the 1912 Summer Olympics – Men's 4 × 100 metres relay =

Men's 4 × 100 metres relay at the Games of the V Olympiad
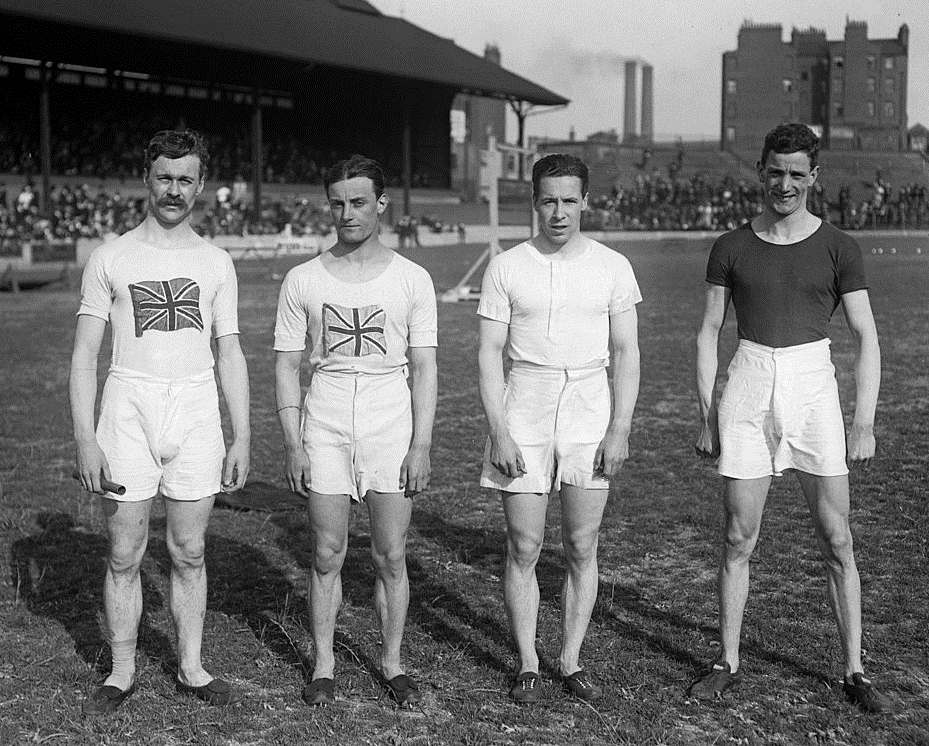
- The winning British relay team.
- Venue: Stockholm Olympic Stadium
- Dates: July 8, 1912 (heats, semifinals); July 9, 1912 (final)
- Competitors: 33 from 8 nations

Medalists
1st place, gold medalist(s)		Victor d'Arcy; Willie Applegarth; Henry Macintosh; David Jacobs	Great Britain
2nd place, silver medalist(s)		Knut Lindberg; Charles Luther; Ivan Möller; Ture Person	Sweden

Official Video

The men's 4 × 100 meters relay was a track and field athletics event held as part of the Athletics at the 1912 Summer Olympics program. It was the debut of the event, which along with the 4 × 400-meter relays marked the first relays of equal legs in the athletics program (a medley relay had been held in 1908). The competition was held on Monday, July 8, 1912, and on Tuesday, July 9, 1912. NOCs could enter 1 team of 4 athletes, with up to 2 reserves.

Thirty-three runners from 8 nations competed. Only Germany replaced one runner.

== Context ==
Though this was the Olympic debut of the event, the 4 × 100 metres relay had been held at meets going back to at least 1897. Meets like the Penn Relays had contested 4 × 440 yards and 4 × 220 yards relays before, but not over the 4 × 110 yard distance or its metric equivalent. Although a sprint medley relay had been held in 1908, this was the first Olympic relay race to take place using batons and exchange zones, rather than exchanging via hand touch.

== Records ==
The previous world record was 43.5 seconds, set by a German team in May 1912.

World record	SC Charlottenburg (GER); Otto Röhr; August Sandvoss; Willy Schöltz; Richard Rau	43.5	Berlin	19 May 1912
Olympic record	N/A			

The record for the new event progressed quickly, with the Canadians winning the first heat. The Americans and then the Swedes then took the record, with the Germans tying the Swedes.

The British took the record in the first semifinal, only to lose it quickly to the Swedes in the second. This time, the Germans running in the third semifinal bested the Swedish team's time to take the record for themselves after replacing Karl Halt with Otto Röhr as their lead-off runner.

The German team held the record at the finish, despite finishing in second (and then being disqualified for a baton-passing fault) in the final. Their disqualification left the event without a bronze medalist, making it the only athletics event to award only two medals.

The record of the German team, 42.3 seconds, became the first official world record for the 4 × 100 meters relay.

== Results ==
=== Heats ===
All heats were held on Monday, July 8, 1912.

Only two teams were eliminated after the first round.

==== Heat 1 ====
Place	Athletes	Time	Qual.
1	Frank McConnell, Frank Lukeman, Harry Beasley, John Howard (CAN)	46.2 OR	QS

==== Heat 2 ====
Place	Athletes	Time	Qual.
1	Ira Courtney, Frank Belote, Clement Wilson, Carl Cooke (USA)	43.7 OR	QS

==== Heat 3 ====
Place	Athletes	Time	Qual.
1	David Jacobs, Henry Macintosh, Willie Applegarth, Victor d'Arcy (GBR)	45.0	QS

==== Heat 4 ====
Place	Athletes	Time	Qual.
1	Ivan Möller, Charles Luther, Ture Person, Knut Lindberg (SWE)	43.6 OR	QS

==== Heat 5 ====
Place	Athletes	Time	Qual.
1	Karl Halt, Max Herrmann, Erwin Kern, Richard Rau (GER)	43.6 =OR	QS
2	Gustav Kröjer, Rudolf Rauch, Fritz Weinzinger, Fritz Fleischer (AUT)	44.8	

==== Heat 6 ====
Place	Athletes	Time	Qual.
1	Ferenc Szobota, Vilmos Rácz, Pál Szalay, István Jankovich (HUN)	43.7	QS
2	Pierre Failliot, Georges Rolot, Charles Lelong, René Mourlon (FRA)	43.8	

=== Semifinals ===
All semifinals were held on Monday, July 8, 1912.

Semifinal 1

The United States team was disqualified after a baton-passing fault on the first transfer.

Place	Athletes	Time	Qual.
1	David Jacobs, Henry Macintosh, Willie Applegarth, Victor d'Arcy (GBR)	43.0 OR	QF
—	Ira Courtney, Frank Belote, Clement Wilson, Carl Cooke (USA)	DSQ	

Semifinal 2

Place	Athletes	Time	Qual.
1	Ivan Möller, Charles Luther, Ture Person, Knut Lindberg (SWE)	42.5 OR	QF
2	Ferenc Szobota, Vilmos Rácz, Pál Szalay, István Jankovich (HUN)	42.9	

Semifinal 3

Place	Athletes	Time	Qual.
1	Otto Röhr, Max Herrmann, Erwin Kern, Richard Rau (GER)	42.3 OR	QF
2	Frank McConnell, Frank Lukeman, Harry Beasley, John Howard (CAN)	43.5	

=== Final ===
The final was held on Tuesday, July 9, 1912: d'Arcy beat Rau and Lindberg in a close and exciting contest.

Afterwards, the German team were disqualified as Kern had passed the 20 metre line before receiving the baton from Herrmann. This left no bronze medalist in the event.

Place	Athletes	Time
1	David Jacobs, Henry Macintosh, Willie Applegarth, Victor d'Arcy (GBR)	42.4
2	Ivan Möller, Charles Luther, Ture Person, Knut Lindberg (SWE)	42.6
—	Otto Röhr, Max Herrmann, Erwin Kern, Richard Rau (GER)	Disqualified

== Gallery ==
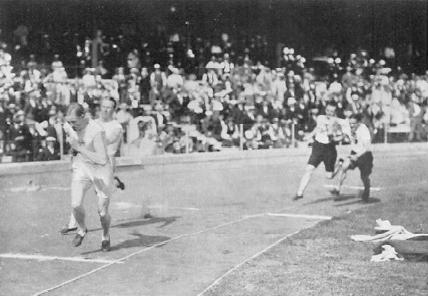
Semifinal 2: Team Sweden on the left and the Hungarian team on the right.

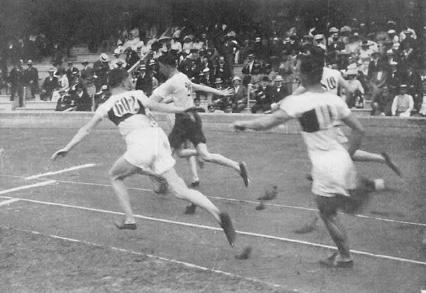
The final: Team Germany passing the baton.

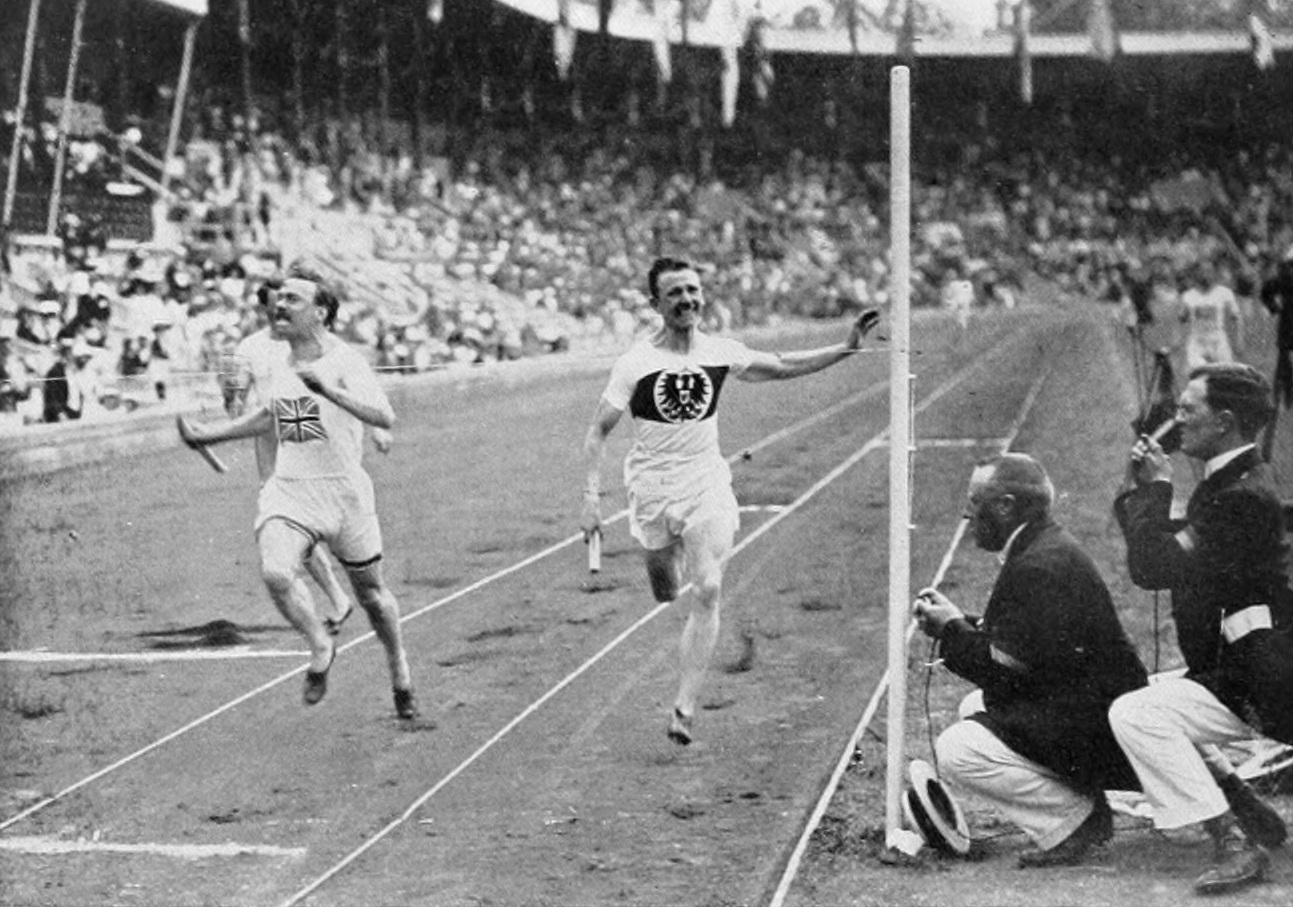
The finish of the final: Victor d'Arcy on the left winning the race for Great Britain. On the right finishing second but later disqualified, Richard Rau for Germany.

== Sources ==
- Bergvall, Erik, ed. (1913). The Official Report of the Olympic Games of Stockholm 1912. Translated by Adams-Ray, Edward. Stockholm: Wahlström & Widstrand.
- Wudarski, Pawel (1999). "Wyniki Igrzysk Olimpijskich" (in Polish).
