= Karl Luther =

Karl Luther may refer to:

- Charles Luther (sprinter), Karl August "Charles" Luther, (1885–1962), Swedish athlete
- Karl Theodor Robert Luther (1822–1900), German astronomer
