= Switzerland at the 1908 Summer Olympics =

- IOC code: SUI
- NOC: Swiss Olympic Association

in London
- Competitors: 1 in 1 sport
- Medals: Gold 0 Silver 0 Bronze 0 Total 0

Summer Olympics appearances (overview)
- 1896; 1900; ~~1904~~; 1908; 1912; 1920; 1924; 1928; 1932; 1936; 1948; 1952; 1956; 1960; 1964; 1968; 1972; 1976; 1980; 1984; 1988; 1992; 1996; 2000; 2004; 2008; 2012; 2016; 2020; 2024; 2028

Other related appearances
- 1906 Intercalated Games

Switzerland competed at the 1908 Summer Olympics in London, England.

== Results by event ==
=== Athletics ===
Switzerland had one track & field athlete compete in 1908, in the hammer throwing event. His results are unknown.

Event	Place	Athlete	Distance
Men's hammer throw	10-19	Julius Wagner	Unknown

== Sources ==
- Cook, Theodore Andrea (1908). The Fourth Olympiad, Being the Official Report. London: British Olympic Association.
- De Wael, Herman (2001). "Top London 1908 Olympians". Herman's Full Olympians. Archived from the original on 12 July 2006.
