= Carl Cooke =

American sprinter (1889–1971)

Personal information
- Born: August 25, 1889 Columbus, Ohio, United States
- Died: July 28, 1971 (aged 81) Columbus, Ohio, United States

Sport
- Sport: Sprinting
- Event: 200 metres

Carl Clement Cooke (August 25, 1889 – July 28, 1971) was an American sprinter. He competed at the 1912 Summer Olympics.

== Early life and education ==
Cooke was born on August 25, 1889, in Columbus, Ohio. He attended Columbus North High School, setting the state shot put record and winning four events at the Ohio championships. He later attended Ohio State University (OSU), where he was a sprinter/long jumper and also played football.

== Athletic career ==
He competed at the Amateur Athletic Union (AUU) tournaments, and was the 220-yard dash runner-up in 1911 and 1913. He also competed for the Chicago Athletic Association and Cleveland Athletic Club.

Cooke was selected to represent the United States at the 1912 Summer Olympics in Stockholm, Sweden, and was to compete in the men's 200 metres, men's 400 metres, and the men's 4 x 100 metres relay. He did not participate in the 400 metres, but did compete in the 200 metres and 4 x 100 metres relay, and in the former lost in the semifinals to Donnell Young, while in the latter his team was disqualified in the semifinals. He also sometimes officiated high school track games.

=== Later life ===
After competing in the Olympics, Cooke left OSU and became an executive in his father's bridge building company, Fritz-Rumer-Cooke. He eventually became the president.

== Personal life ==
Cooke was married to Dorothy Beebe, and died in July 1971, at the age of 81.
