= James Kenyon =

James Kenyon may refer to:

- James Kenyon (cinematographer) (1850–1925), businessman and pioneer of cinematography in Blackburn, England
- James Kenyon (politician) (1846–1924), British Member of Parliament for Bury
- James Kenyon (sport shooter) (1875–1935), Canadian Olympic sport shooter
- Jimmy Kenyon (1888–1949), English footballer for Stockport County, Bradford Park Avenue, Glossop and Rochdale
