= Switzerland at the 1912 Summer Olympics =

- IOC code: SUI
- NOC: Swiss Olympic Association

in Stockholm
- Medals: Gold 0 Silver 0 Bronze 0 Total 0

Summer Olympics appearances (overview)
- 1896; 1900; 1904; 1908; 1912; 1920; 1924; 1928; 1932; 1936; 1948; 1952; 1956; 1960; 1964; 1968; 1972; 1976; 1980; 1984; 1988; 1992; 1996; 2000; 2004; 2008; 2012; 2016; 2020; 2024

Other related appearances
- 1906 Intercalated Games

Switzerland competed at the 1912 Summer Olympics in Stockholm, Sweden.

== Athletics ==
A single athlete represented Switzerland. It was the nation's third appearance in athletics, and the second time that Julius Wagner was the only representative Switzerland sent in the sport. Wagner was in 20th place after the third round of the pentathlon, resulting in his elimination.

Ranks given are within that athlete's heat for running events.

Athlete	Events	Heat		Semifinal		Final	
Athlete	Events	Result	Rank	Result	Rank	Result	Rank
Julius Wagner	Pentathlon	N/A				Elim-3 52	20
