= Władysław Ponurski =

Polish sprinter

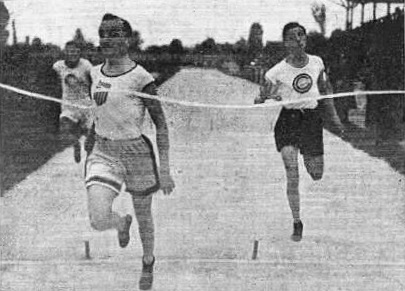
Władysław Ponurski (left) and Edward Jakubowicz in 1912.

Władysław Ponurski (April 23, 1891 in Lemberg – October 13, 1978 in Kraków) was a Polish track and field athlete. Ponurski competed in the men's 200 metres and the men's 400 metres for Austria at the 1912 Summer Olympics. Ponurski was born in the Kingdom of Galicia and Lodomeria (now Ukraine).
