= Otto Bäurle =

German triple jumper

Otto Bäurle (February 3, 1887 – April 26, 1951) was a German track and field athlete, born in Munich, who competed in the 1912 Summer Olympics. In 1912, he finished 14th in the triple jump competition. He also participated in the pentathlon event but retired after three events.
