= Richard Rice (athlete) =

British track and field athlete

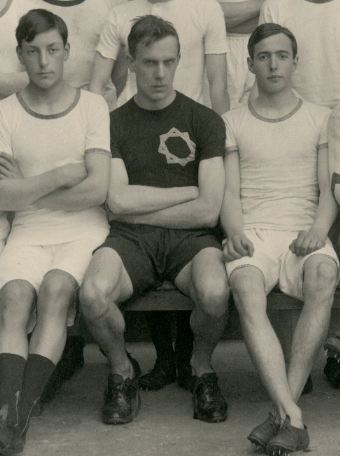

Personal information
- Nationality: British
- Born: 18 October 1886
- Died: 15 October 1939 (aged 52)

Sport
- Sport: Athletics
- Club: London Hospital & Abingdon School

Richard Goodenough Rice (19 March 1886 – 15 October 1939) was a British track and field athlete who competed in the 1912 Summer Olympics.

== Profile ==
He was one of three brothers to attend Abingdon School where he was educated from 1895 until 1903, the brothers were called Geoffrey Cecil Rice and Alexander Guy Campbell Rice. He gained colours at the school in soccer and cricket. After leaving Abingdon, he went to London University, playing soccer and winning the United Hospital Sports 100 yards title in 1905. He then won the Inter Hospitals title three years running from 1907-1909.

== Olympics ==
In 1912, he attended the Olympic trials before being selected to represent Great Britain. In 1912 he was eliminated in the semi-finals of the 100 metres competition as well as of the 200 metres event.

== Later life ==
He served with the Royal Berkshire Regiment in 1914 before becoming a 2nd Lieutenant with the Royal Garrison Artillery in 1918.

== See also ==
- List of Old Abingdonians
