= Jan Grijseels =

Dutch sprinter

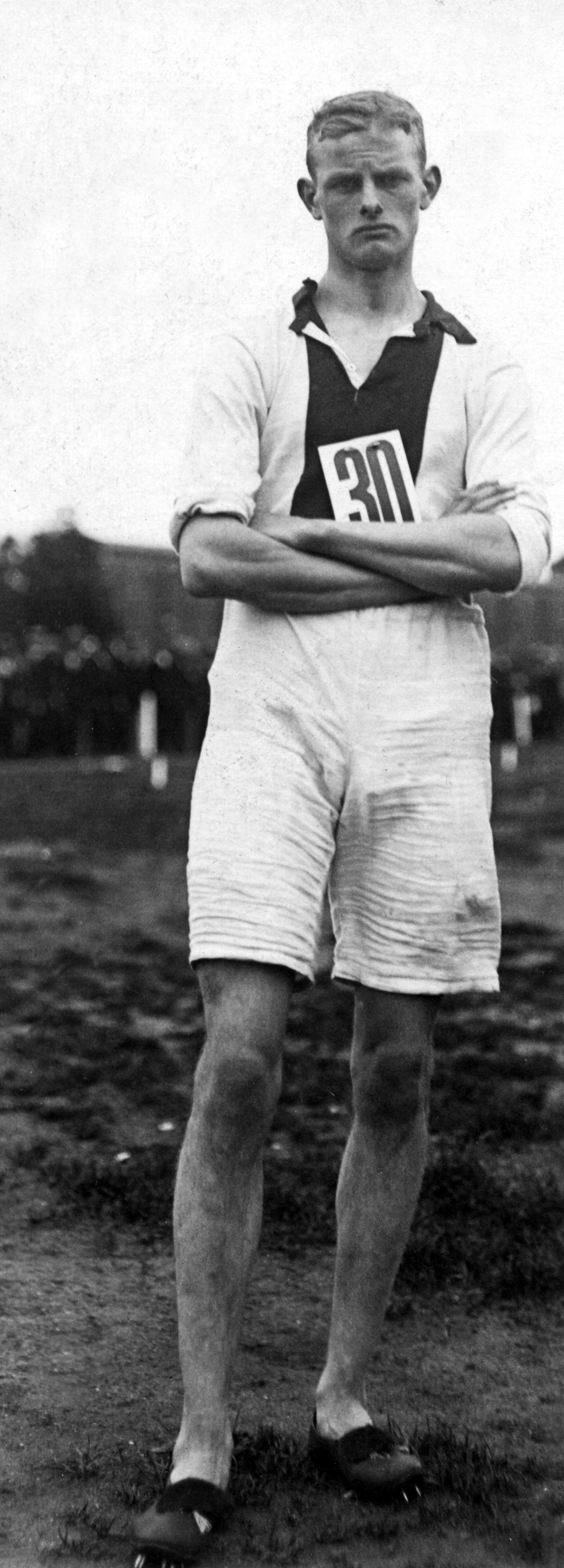
Jan Grijseels sr.

Johannes "Jan" Antonius Constantius Marie Grijseels (October 6, 1890 – May 10, 1961) was a Dutch track and field athlete, who competed in the 1912 Summer Olympics. He was a seventeenfold Dutch champion in all track events, running up from 100 to 800 metres.

Grijseels was born in Abcoude-Proosdij and died in Noordwijkerhout.

In 1912, he was eliminated in the semi-finals of the 200 metres competition. He was eliminated in the first round in the 100 metres event.
