= István Déván =

Hungarian sprinter and cross-country skier (1891–1977)

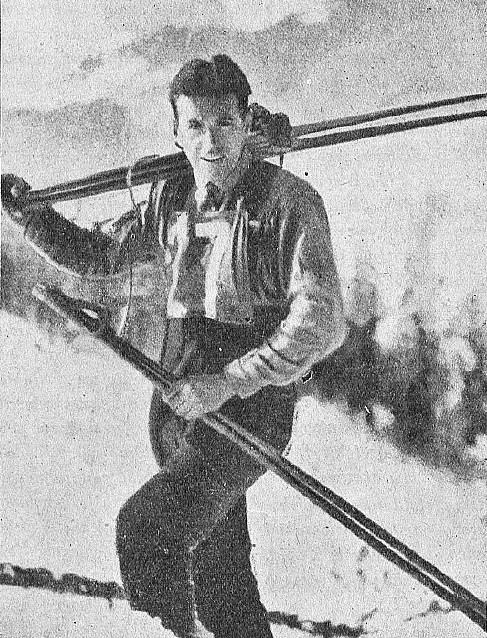

István Déván (Slovak: Štefan Déván; 4 November 1890 – 20 April 1977) was a Hungarian track and field athlete and cross-country skier who competed for Hungary in the 1912 Summer Olympics and in the 1924 Winter Olympics.

He was born in Pressburg (Pozsony), Austria-Hungary (today Bratislava, Slovakia) and died in Kempten im Allgäu, West Germany.

In 1912, he was eliminated in the semifinals of the 200 metres competition. He also participated in the 400 metres event but was eliminated in the first round. He was also a member of the Hungarian team, which was eliminated in the first round of the 4x400 metre relay competition.

Twelve years later, he participated in the first Winter Olympics and finished 31st in the 18 km cross-country skiing event.
