= František Szobota =

Hungarian, Slovak sprinter

František Szobota (August 30, 1891 – January 10, 1939) was a Hungarian track and field athlete of Slovak descent in the 1912 Summer Olympics. He was born in Košice and committed suicide in Levoča. In 1912, he was eliminated in the semifinals of the 100 metres competition. He was also a member of the Hungarian team which was eliminated in the semifinals of the 4x100 metre relay competition.
