= Hugo Ericson =

Swedish pentathlete

Personal information
- Nationality: Swedish
- Born: 10 March 1886 Sundsvall, Sweden
- Died: 2 February 1945 (aged 58) Sundsvall, Sweden

Sport
- Sport: Athletics
- Event: Pentathlon

Hugo Ericson (10 March 1886 – 2 February 1945) was a Swedish athlete. He competed in the men's pentathlon at the 1912 Summer Olympics.
