= Sari Lindblom =

Finnish pedagogue and rector

- Born: 6 May 1960 (age 66); Helsinki, Finland
- Parent: Seppo Lindblom (father)

Academic background
- Thesis: Studying in a traditional medical curriculum : study success, orientations to studying and problems that arise (1999)

Academic work
- Discipline: Psychologist
- Sub-discipline: Educationalist
- Institutions: University of Helsinki

Sari Lindblom (born 6 May 1960) is a Finnish psychologist and educationalist specialising in tertiary education, who has since 2022 served as the first female rector of the University of Helsinki.

Prior to her appointment as the rector, Lindblom held the positions of vice- and deputy rector, as well as directing the university's Centre for University Teaching and Learning 'HYPE' from 2004 to 2017.

Lindblom has (co-)authored 17 books and over 100 articles. She publishes also under her married name Lindblom-Ylänne.

Lindblom's is the eldest daughter of the banker and politician Seppo Lindblom, and a grandchild of the trade unionist and politician Olavi Lindblom.

== Controversies ==
=== Collective bargaining and workplace policy ===
In March 2025, as a board member of Finnish Education Employers (FEE) and Rector of the University of Helsinki, Lindblom published commentary advocating for the reintroduction of strict working-time monitoring at the university, a shift away from the flexible performance-based workload agreement established in 1998. Critics argued this would reverse decades of progress in academic labor regulation and undermine collective bargaining agreements.

=== Academic freedom and student activism ===
During the 2023–2025 period, university leadership under Lindblom was criticized for suppressing pro-Palestinian campus activism. In November 2023, a peaceful student sit-in was broken up by police and university security, with electricity cut off at the protest site. In May 2025, internal university mailing lists reportedly began redirecting or blocking messages advocating for an academic boycott of Israeli institutions, actions that faculty and students attributed to administrative-level intervention.

Critics noted that similar expressions of solidarity during the Ukraine conflict were tolerated or even encouraged, and accused the university of applying double standards in regulating political discourse on campus.

=== Rosebud Bookstore Eviction ===
Lindblom has also been criticized for declining to respond to media and public inquiries regarding the eviction of the independent Rosebud Bookstore from the university campus. Coverage in Helsingin Sanomat noted the rector's silence and framed the eviction as detrimental to intellectual and cultural diversity.
