= Inge Lindholm =

Swedish athlete

Personal information
- Born: 22 June 1892 Karlstad, Värmland, Sweden
- Died: 24 May 1932 (aged 39) Stockholm, Sweden

Sport
- Sport: Athletics
- Event: triple jump / high jump / pentathlon
- Club: IFK Karlstad

Inge Lindholm (22 June 1892 – 24 May 1932) was a Swedish track and field athlete who competed in the 1912 Summer Olympics.

== Career ==
Lindholm was selected to represent Sweden in his home Olympics in 1912 in Stockholm. He finished twelfth in the triple jump competition. He also participated in the pentathlon competition. He was in eighth place after four events and did not finish the final 1500 m run.

The following year, he finished third behind Benjamin Howard Baker in the high jump event and second behind Sidney Abrahams in the long jump event at the British 1913 AAA Championships.
