= Pál Szalay (athlete) =

Hungarian athlete and footballer (born 1892)

Personal information
- Date of birth: 30 June 1892
- Place of birth: Kula, Austria-Hungary
- Height: 1.80 m (5 ft 11 in)
- Position: Forward

Senior career*
Years	Team	Apps	(Gls)
1910–1922	MTK Budapest		

Managerial career
- 1932: Pontedera
- 1932–1933: Pro Patria
- 1933–1934: Pistoiese
- 1934–1937: Macerata
- 1938–1939: Parma
- 1939–1940: Treviso
- 1941–1942: Rieti
- 1947: Carrarese
- 1948: Pisa
- 1948–1949: Aurora Pro Patria
- 1953–1954: Barletta
- 1957–1958: Potenza
- * Club domestic league appearances and goals

Pál Szalay (born 30 June 1892, date of death unknown) was a Hungarian track and field athlete, football player and manager.

At the 1912 Summer Olympics he competed in the 100 metres, the 4 × 100 metres relay and the long jump. He represented the sports clubs Kőbánya TE and from 1911 MTK Budapest, becoming Hungarian champion in the 100 and 220 yard sprint events in 1913. He also played football for MTK Budapest from 1910 to 1922, although his career was interrupted by service in World War I.

After retiring as a player and athlete, he was a football manager in Italy for almost three decades.
