= Athletics at the 1912 Summer Olympics – Men's pentathlon =

Men's pentathlon at the Games of the V Olympiad
- Venue: Stockholm Olympic Stadium
- Date: July 7
- Competitors: 26

Medalists
1st place, gold medalist(s)		Jim Thorpe	United States
2nd place, silver medalist(s)		Ferdinand Bie	Norway
2nd place, silver medalist(s)		James Donahue	United States
3rd place, bronze medalist(s)		Frank Lukeman	Canada

The men's pentathlon was a track and field athletics event held as part of the Athletics at the 1912 Summer Olympics programme. It was the first time the event was held. Twenty-six athletes from 11 nations competed. NOCs could enter up to 12 athletes. Jim Thorpe's gold medal was the first ever won by an Indigenous athlete in Olympic history.

== Results ==
Thorpe's gold medal was stripped by the International Olympic Committee in 1913, after the IOC learned that Thorpe had taken expense money for playing baseball, violating contemporary Olympic amateurism rules, before the 1912 Games. This moved everyone else up in the rankings. In 1982, the IOC was convinced that the disqualification had been improper, as no protest against Thorpe's eligibility had been brought within the required 30 days and reinstated Thorpe's medals, but without demoting the other athletes. This made Thorpe and Bie co-champions. In 2022, in consultation with surviving members of Ferdinand Bie's family, the IOC reinstated Thorpe as the sole winner of the event, as all his competitors had always wanted.

The placings for each discipline, used to calculate the points awarded against each athlete, were recalculated discounting Thorpe in 1913. Thorpe's reinstatement in 1982 was as co-holder of his positions in each discipline, leaving the revised points against the other athletes unchanged. The points were not recalculated again when Thorpe was reinstated as sole gold medallist in 2022, because the extra point that would have been debited against James Donahue would have placed him below Frank Lukeman and required the medals to be redistributed; this was considered inappropriate, as Donahue initially finished ahead of Lukeman before Thorpe's disqualification.

=== Long jump ===
Event 1
Place	Athlete	Distance	Score
1	Jim Thorpe (USA)	7.07	1
2	Ferdinand Bie (NOR)	6.85	1
3	James Donahue (USA)	6.83	2
4	Avery Brundage (USA)	6.58	3
5	Oscar Lemming (SWE)	6.55	4
6	Charles Lomberg (SWE)	6.53	5
7	Otto Bäurle (GER)	6.52	6
8	Erik Kugelberg (SWE)	6.45	7
8	Frank Lukeman (CAN)	6.45	7
10	Nils Fjästad (SWE)	6.43	9
11	James Menaul (USA)	6.40	10
12	Inge Lindholm (SWE)	6.32	11
13	Pierre Failliot (FRA)	6.29	12
14	Hugo Wieslander (SWE)	6.27	13
15	Einar Nilsson (SWE)	6.23	14
16	Julius Wagner (SUI)	6.22	15
17	Emil Kukko (FIN)	6.19	16
18	John Eller (USA)	6.17	17
19	Gustav Krojer (AUT)	6.10	18
20	Gösta Holmér (SWE)	6.02	19
21	Géo André (FRA)	5.98	20
22	Halt/Waitzer (GER)		21
23	Alfredo Pagani (ITA)	5.86	22
24	Halt/Waitzer (GER)		23
25	Mgirdiç Migiryan (TUR)	5.59	24
26	Hugo Ericson (SWE)	5.58	25

=== Javelin throw ===
Event 2
Place	Athlete	Distance	Score
1	Hugo Wieslander (SWE)	49.56	1
2	Oscar Lemming (SWE)	49.51	2
3	Jim Thorpe (USA)	46.71	3
4	Ferdinand Bie (NOR)	46.45	3
5	Gösta Holmér (SWE)	45.46	4
6	Emil Kukko (FIN)	44.43	5
7	Hugo Ericson (SWE)	43.74	6
8	Einar Nilsson (SWE)	43.67	7
9	Avery Brundage (USA)	42.85	8
10	Karl Halt (GER)	42.75	9
11	Erik Kugelberg (SWE)	42.02	10
12	Inge Lindholm (SWE)	41.94	11
13	Julius Wagner (SUI)	41.31	12
14	Nils Fjästad (SWE)	40.15	13
15	Gustav Krojer (AUT)	39.89	14
16	James Donahue (USA)	38.28	15
17	Charles Lomberg (SWE)	37.15	16
18	Mgirdiç Migiryan (TUR)	36.87	17
19	Frank Lukeman (CAN)	36.02	18
20	James Menaul (USA)	35.85	19
21	Géo André (FRA)	34.83	20
22	Otto Bäurle (GER)	34.29	21
23	Alfredo Pagani (ITA)	34.23	22
24	Pierre Failliot (FRA)	33.46	23
25	John Eller (USA)	33.36	24
26	Josef Waitzer (GER)		25

After 2 events
Place	Athlete	1	2	Total
1	Jim Thorpe (USA)	1	3	4
1	Ferdinand Bie (NOR)	1	3	4
3	Oscar Lemming (SWE)	4	2	6
4	Avery Brundage (USA)	3	8	11
5	Hugo Wieslander (SWE)	13	1	14
6	James Donahue (USA)	2	15	17
6	Erik Kugelberg (SWE)	7	10	17
8	Emil Kukko (FIN)	16	5	21
8	Charles Lomberg (SWE)	5	16	21
8	Einar Nilsson (SWE)	14	7	21
11	Nils Fjästad (SWE)	9	13	22
11	Inge Lindholm (SWE)	11	11	22
13	Gösta Holmér (SWE)	19	4	23
14	Frank Lukeman (CAN)	7	18	25
15	Otto Bäurle (GER)	6	21	27
15	Julius Wagner (SUI)	15	12	27
17	James Menaul (USA)	10	19	29
18/19	Hugo Ericson (SWE)	25	6	31
18/20	Karl Halt (GER)	21/23	9	30/32
20	Gustav Krojer (AUT)	18	14	32
21	Pierre Failliot (FRA)	12	23	35
22	Géo André (FRA)	20	20	40
23	John Eller (USA)	17	24	41
23	Mgirdiç Migiryan (TUR)	24	17	41
25	Alfredo Pagani (ITA)	22	22	44
26	Josef Waitzer (GER)	21/23	25	46/48

=== 200 metres ===
Halt and Waitzer both dropped out of the running, not finishing the 200 metres. After the event was over, only the top 12 athletes advanced to the fourth event, with everyone else eliminated. Scores were recalculated after the eliminations.

Event 3
Place	Athlete	Time	Score
1	Jim Thorpe (USA)	22.9	1
2	James Donahue (USA)	23.0	1
2	James Menaul (USA)	23.0	1
4	John Eller (USA)	23.1	3
5	Frank Lukeman (CAN)	23.2	4
6	Pierre Failliot (FRA)	23.2	4
7	Ferdinand Bie (NOR)	23.5	6
7	Inge Lindholm (SWE)	23.5	6
9	Otto Bäurle (GER)	23.6	8
9	Nils Fjästad (SWE)	23.6	8
11	Hugo Ericson (SWE)	24.0	10
11	Gösta Holmér (SWE)	24.0	10
11	Emil Kukko (FIN)	24.0	10
14	Hugo Wieslander (SWE)	24.1	13
15	Avery Brundage (USA)	24.2	14
16	Einar Nilsson (SWE)	24.3	15
17	Charles Lomberg (SWE)	24.4	16
18	Géo André (FRA)	24.6	17
18	Oscar Lemming (SWE)	24.6	17
20	Gustav Krojer (AUT)	24.7	19
21	Erik Kugelberg (SWE)	24.9	20
22	Alfredo Pagani (ITA)	25.2	21
23	Julius Wagner (SUI)	25.3	22
24	Mgirdiç Migiryan (TUR)	26.4	23
25	Karl Halt (GER)	DNF	---
26	Josef Waitzer (GER)	DNS	---

After 3 events
Place	Athlete	1	2	3	Total
1	Jim Thorpe (USA)	1	3	1	5
2	Ferdinand Bie (NOR)	1	3	6	10
3	James Donahue (USA)	2	15	1	18
4	Oscar Lemming (SWE)	4	2	17	23
5	Avery Brundage (USA)	3	8	14	25
6	Hugo Wieslander (SWE)	13	1	13	27
7	Inge Lindholm (SWE)	11	11	6	28
8	Frank Lukeman (CAN)	7	18	4	29
9	Nils Fjästad (SWE)	9	13	8	30
9	James Menaul (USA)	10	19	1	30
11	Emil Kukko (FIN)	16	5	10	31
12	Gösta Holmér (SWE)	19	4	10	33
13	Otto Bäurle (GER)	6	21	8	35
14	Einar Nilsson (SWE)	14	7	15	36
15	Erik Kugelberg (SWE)	7	10	20	37
15	Charles Lomberg (SWE)	5	16	16	37
17	Pierre Failliot (FRA)	12	23	4	39
18	Hugo Ericson (SWE)	25	6	10	41
19	John Eller (USA)	17	24	3	44
20	Julius Wagner (SUI)	15	12	22	49
21	Gustav Krojer (AUT)	18	14	19	51
22	Géo André (FRA)	20	20	17	57
23	Mgirdiç Migiryan (TUR)	24	17	23	64
24	Alfredo Pagani (ITA)	22	22	21	65
25	Karl Halt (GER)	21/23	9	---	DNF-2 30/32
26	Josef Waitzer (GER)	21/23	25	---	DNF-2 46/48

After eliminations
Place	Athlete	1	2	3	Total
1	Jim Thorpe (USA)	1	3	1	5
2	Ferdinand Bie (NOR)	1	3	4	8
3	James Donahue (USA)	2	9	1	12
4	Oscar Lemming (SWE)	4	2	11	17
5	Frank Lukeman (CAN)	5	10	3	18
6	Avery Brundage (USA)	3	6	10	19
6	Inge Lindholm (SWE)	8	7	4	19
6	James Menaul (USA)	7	11	1	19
6	Hugo Wieslander (SWE)	9	1	9	19
10	Nils Fjästad (SWE)	6	8	6	20
11	Gösta Holmér (SWE)	11	4	7	22
11	Emil Kukko (FIN)	10	5	7	22
13	Otto Bäurle (GER)	6	21	8	Elim-3 35
14	Einar Nilsson (SWE)	14	7	15	Elim-3 36
15	Erik Kugelberg (SWE)	7	10	20	Elim-3 37
15	Charles Lomberg (SWE)	5	16	16	Elim-3 37
17	Pierre Failliot (FRA)	12	23	4	Elim-3 39
18	Hugo Ericson (SWE)	25	6	10	Elim-3 43
19	John Eller (USA)	17	24	3	Elim-3 44
20	Julius Wagner (SUI)	15	12	22	Elim-3 49
21	Gustav Krojer (AUT)	18	14	19	Elim-3 51
22	Géo André (FRA)	20	20	17	Elim-3 57
23	Mgirdiç Migiryan (TUR)	24	17	23	Elim-3 64
24	Alfredo Pagani (ITA)	22	22	21	Elim-3 65
25	Karl Halt (GER)	0	9	---	DNF-2 30/32
26	Josef Waitzer (GER)	0	25	---	DNF-2 46/48

=== Discus throw ===
Only the top 6 athletes after the discus throw advanced to the final event. Since at the time there was a tie for 6th (before the points were recalculated after Jim Thorpe's disqualification), both of the 6th-place athletes moved on, making 7 competitors in the 1500 metres. Scores were not recalculated after the second cut.

Event 4
Place	Athlete	Distance	Score
1	Jim Thorpe (USA)	35.57	1
2	Avery Brundage (USA)	34.72	1
3	Frank Lukeman (CAN)	33.76	2
4	Ferdinand Bie (NOR)	31.79	3
5	Gösta Holmér (SWE)	31.78	4
6	James Menaul (USA)	31.38	5
7	Hugo Wieslander (SWE)	30.74	6
8	Inge Lindholm (SWE)	30.47	7
9	Nils Fjästad (SWE)	30.43	8
10	Emil Kukko (FIN)	29.97	9
11	James Donahue (USA)	29.64	10
12	Oscar Lemming (SWE)	27.64	11
—	Otto Bäurle (GER)	Elim	---
—	Einar Nilsson (SWE)	Elim	---
—	Erik Kugelberg (SWE)	Elim	---
—	Charles Lomberg (SWE)	Elim	---
—	Pierre Failliot (FRA)	Elim	---
—	Hugo Ericson (SWE)	Elim	---
—	John Eller (USA)	Elim	---
—	Julius Wagner (SUI)	Elim	---
—	Gustav Krojer (AUT)	Elim	---
—	Géo André (FRA)	Elim	---
—	Mgirdiç Migiryan (TUR)	Elim	---
—	Alfredo Pagani (ITA)	Elim	---
—	Karl Halt (GER)	Elim	---
—	Josef Waitzer (GER)	Elim	---

After 4 events
Place	Athlete	1	2	3	4	Total
1	Jim Thorpe (USA)	1	3	1	1	6
2	Ferdinand Bie (NOR)	1	3	4	3	11
3	Avery Brundage (USA)	3	6	10	1	20
3	Frank Lukeman (CAN)	5	10	3	2	20
5	James Donahue (USA)	2	9	1	10	22
6	James Menaul (USA)	7	11	1	5	24
7	Hugo Wieslander (SWE)	9	1	9	6	25
8	Gösta Holmér (SWE)	11	4	7	4	26
8	Inge Lindholm (SWE)	8	7	4	7	26
10	Nils Fjästad (SWE)	6	8	6	8	28
10	Oscar Lemming (SWE)	4	2	11	11	28
12	Emil Kukko (FIN)	10	5	7	9	31
13	Otto Bäurle (GER)	6	21	8	---	Elim-3 35
14	Einar Nilsson (SWE)	14	7	15	---	Elim-3 36
15	Erik Kugelberg (SWE)	7	10	20	---	Elim-3 37
15	Charles Lomberg (SWE)	5	16	16	---	Elim-3 37
17	Pierre Failliot (FRA)	12	23	4	---	Elim-3 39
18	Hugo Ericson (SWE)	25	6	10	---	Elim-3 41
19	John Eller (USA)	17	24	3	---	Elim-3 44
20	Julius Wagner (SUI)	15	12	22	---	Elim-3 49
21	Gustav Krojer (AUT)	18	14	19	---	Elim-3 51
22	Géo André (FRA)	20	20	17	---	Elim-3 57
23	Mgirdiç Migiryan (TUR)	24	17	23	---	Elim-3 64
24	Alfredo Pagani (ITA)	22	22	21	---	Elim-3 65
25	Karl Halt (GER)	21/23	9	---	---	DNF-2 30/32
26	Josef Waitzer (GER)	21/23	25	---	---	DNF-2 46/48

=== 1500 metres ===
The tie between Donahue and Lukeman was broken by calculating each athlete's score on the decathlon table, originally deciding between a bronze medal and fourth place. Donahue won, 3475.865 points to 3396.975 points, to take the bronze medal. Thorpe's disqualification in 1913 resulted in Bie being awarded the gold medal, while Donahue and Lukeman moved up to silver and bronze, respectively. When Thorpe's results were reinstated 70 years later, his gold medal status was returned while the other three athletes kept their upgraded placings—resulting in two gold medalists. In 2022, the IOC reinstated Thorpe as the sole winner of the gold medal, and named Bie a co-winner of silver alongside Donahue.

Event 5
Place	Athlete	Time	Score
1	Jim Thorpe (USA)	4:44.8	1
2	James Menaul (USA)	4:49.6	1
3	James Donahue (USA)	4:51.0	2
4	Hugo Wieslander (SWE)	4:53.1	3
5	Frank Lukeman (CAN)	5:00.2	4
6	Ferdinand Bie (NOR)	5:07.8	5
—	Avery Brundage (USA)	DNF	6
—	Gösta Holmér (SWE)	Elim	---
—	Inge Lindholm (SWE)	Elim	---
—	Oscar Lemming (SWE)	Elim	---
—	Nils Fjästad (SWE)	Elim	---
—	Emil Kukko (FIN)	Elim	---
—	Otto Bäurle (GER)	Elim	---
—	Einar Nilsson (SWE)	Elim	---
—	Erik Kugelberg (SWE)	Elim	---
—	Charles Lomberg (SWE)	Elim	---
—	Pierre Failliot (FRA)	Elim	---
—	Hugo Ericson (SWE)	Elim	---
—	John Eller (USA)	Elim	---
—	Julius Wagner (SUI)	Elim	---
—	Gustav Krojer (AUT)	Elim	---
—	Géo André (FRA)	Elim	---
—	Mgirdiç Migiryan (TUR)	Elim	---
—	Alfredo Pagani (ITA)	Elim	---
—	Karl Halt (GER)	Elim	---
—	Josef Waitzer (GER)	Elim	---

Final standings
Place	Athlete	1	2	3	4	5	Total
Gold	Jim Thorpe (USA)	1	3	1	1	1	7
Silver	Ferdinand Bie (NOR)	1	3	4	3	5	16
Silver	James Donahue (USA)	2	9	1	10	2	24
Bronze	Frank Lukeman (CAN)	5	10	3	2	4	24
4	James Menaul (USA)	7	11	1	5	1	25
5	Avery Brundage (USA)	3	6	10	1	6	26
6	Hugo Wieslander (SWE)	9	1	9	6	3	28
7	Gösta Holmér (SWE)	11	4	7	4	---	Elim-4 26
7	Inge Lindholm (SWE)	8	7	4	7	---	Elim-4 26
9	Nils Fjästad (SWE)	6	8	6	8	---	Elim-4 28
9	Oscar Lemming (SWE)	4	2	11	11	---	Elim-4 28
11	Emil Kukko (FIN)	10	5	7	9	---	Elim-4 31
12	Otto Bäurle (GER)	6	21	8	---	---	Elim-3 35
13	Einar Nilsson (SWE)	14	7	15	---	---	Elim-3 36
14	Erik Kugelberg (SWE)	7	10	20	---	---	Elim-3 37
14	Charles Lomberg (SWE)	5	16	16	---	---	Elim-3 37
16	Pierre Failliot (FRA)	12	23	4	---	---	Elim-3 39
17	Hugo Ericson (SWE)	25	6	10	---	---	Elim-3 41
18	John Eller (USA)	17	24	3	---	---	Elim-3 44
19	Julius Wagner (SUI)	15	12	22	---	---	Elim-3 49
20	Gustav Krojer (AUT)	18	14	19	---	---	Elim-3 51
21	Géo André (FRA)	20	20	17	---	---	Elim-3 57
22	Mgirdiç Migiryan (TUR)	24	17	23	---	---	Elim-3 64
23	Alfredo Pagani (ITA)	22	22	21	---	---	Elim-3 65
24	Karl Halt (GER)	21/23	9	---	---	---	DNF-2 30/32
25	Josef Waitzer (GER)	21/23	25	---	---	---	DNF-2 46/48

== Sources ==
- Bergvall, Erik, ed. (1913). The Official Report of the Olympic Games of Stockholm 1912. Translated by Adams-Ray, Edward. Stockholm: Wahlström & Widstrand.
- Wudarski, Pawel (1999). "Wyniki Igrzysk Olimpijskich" (in Polish).
