= Emil Grandell =

Swedish sprinter

Emil Grandell (5 December 1889 – 20 May 1963) was a Swedish track and field athlete who competed in the 1912 Summer Olympics. In 1912, he was eliminated in the first round of the 200 metres competition.
