= Herman Sotaaen =

Norwegian sprinter

Herman Sotaaen (August 27, 1888 – August 27, 1967) was a Norwegian track and field athlete who competed in the 1912 Summer Olympics. In 1912 he was eliminated in the first round of the 100 metres competition as well as of the 200 metres event.
