= Emil Kukko =

Finnish athlete (1888–1963)

Emil Kukko (14 May 1888, Vaasa – 25 July 1963) was a Finnish track and field athlete who competed in the 1912 Summer Olympics.

In 1912, he finished 18th in the javelin throw competition and 24th in the long jump event. He also participated in the pentathlon competition. Being in twelfth place after four events, he did not start in the 1500 m run.
