= Josef Waitzer =

German track and field athlete

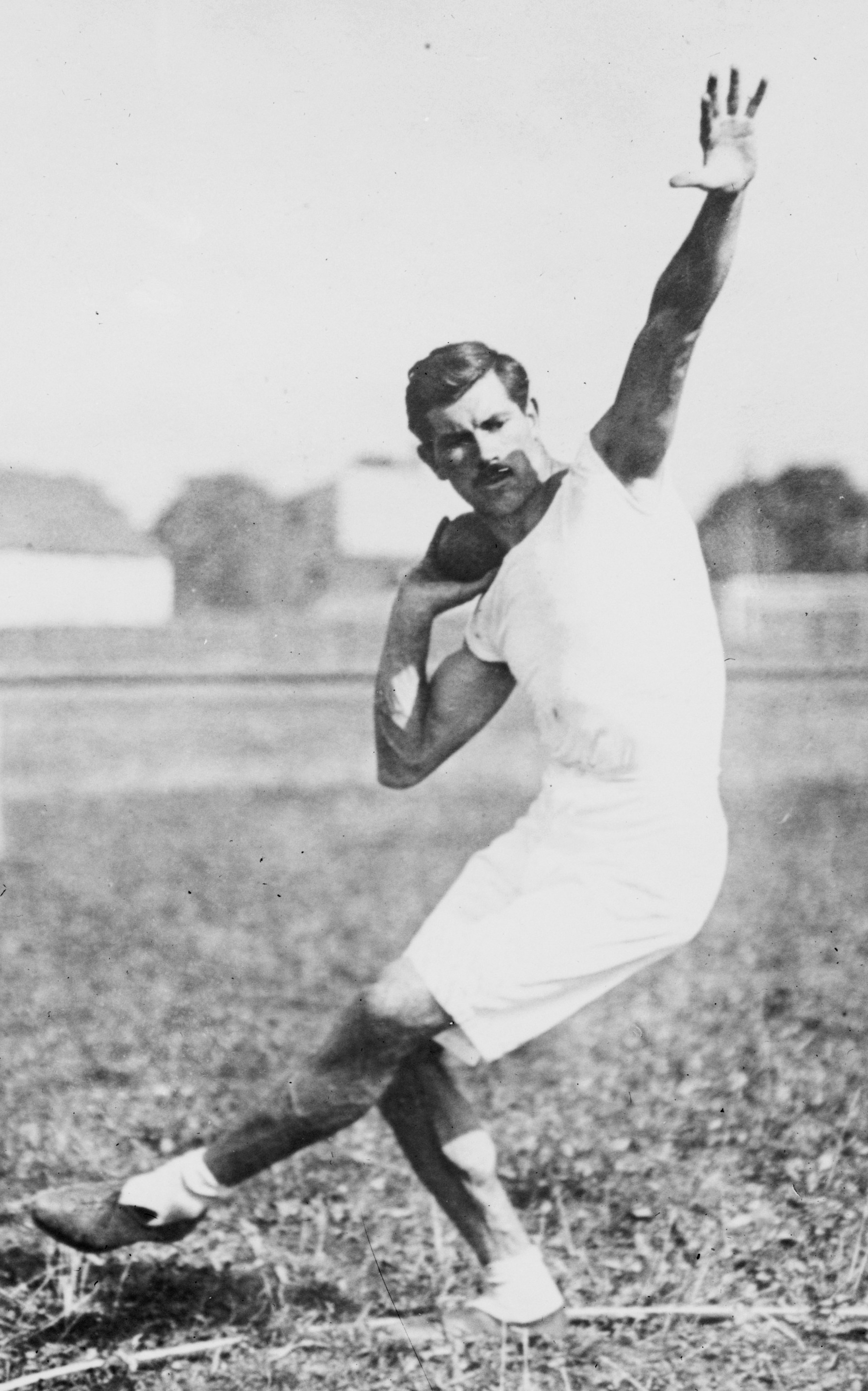
- Josef Waitzer at the 1912 Olympics

Personal information
- Born: 1 May 1884 Munich, German Empire
- Died: 28 March 1966 (aged 81) Korbach, West Germany

Sport
- Sport: Athletics
- Events: Discus throw, javelin throw, pentathlon
- Club: TSV 1860 München

Achievements and titles
- Personal best: DT – 41.70 m (1910)

Josef Waitzer (1 May 1884 – 28 March 1966) was a German track and field athlete who competed in the 1912 Summer Olympics. He placed 19th in the javelin throw and 16th in the discus throw, and failed to finish the pentathlon event.

== Biography ==
He was born on 1 May 1884. After retiring from competitions, Waitzer worked as an athletics coach and functionary. He headed the Bavarian Athletics Federation in 1948–1950 and 1951–1953. He died on 28 March 1966.

He also worked with German wrestlers, including Jean Foldeak.
