= Max Herrmann (athlete) =

German sprinter (1885–1915)

Max Herrmann (March 17, 1885 – January 29, 1915) was a German track and field athlete who competed in the 1912 Summer Olympics. He was born in Danzig, German Empire.

In 1912 he was eliminated in the first round of the 100 metres competition as well as of the 400 metres event. He was eliminated in the semi-finals in the 200 metres competition. He was also a member of the German relay team, which was disqualified in the final of the 4 × 100 metre relay competition after a fault with its second baton passing. In the 4 × 400 metre relay event, he was eliminated with the German team in the first round.

He was killed in action during World War I.

== See also ==
- List of Olympians killed in World War I
