= Nils Fjästad =

Swedish pentathlete

Personal information
- Nationality: Swedish
- Born: 26 February 1890 Stockholm, Sweden
- Died: 13 July 1964 (aged 74) Stockholm, Sweden

Sport
- Sport: Athletics
- Event: Pentathlon

Nils Fjästad (26 February 1890 – 13 July 1964) was a Swedish athlete. He competed in the men's pentathlon at the 1912 Summer Olympics.
