= Peter Clarence Gerhardt =

American sprinter

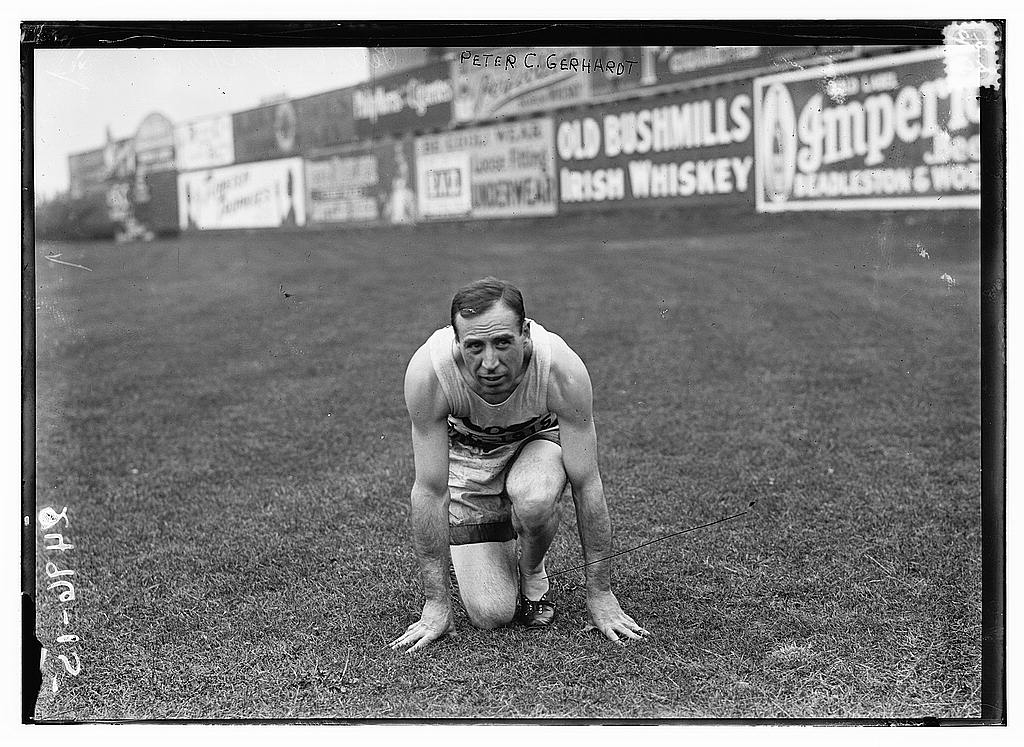
Gerhardt circa 1912

Peter Clarence Gerhardt (November 26, 1877 – August 5, 1952) was a track and field athlete at the 200 meters.

== Biography ==
He was born on November 26, 1877, in Virginia City, Nevada.

== See also ==
- United States at the 1912 Summer Olympics
