= Austin Menaul =

American athlete (1888–1975)

James Menaul
Personal information
- Full name: James Austin Menaul
- Nationality: American
- Born: March 26, 1888 Albuquerque, New Mexico, United States
- Died: October 17, 1975 (aged 87) Menlo Park, California, United States

Sport
- Sport: Athletics
- Event(s): Pentathlon, Decathlon, Shot put, High jump
- Club: Chicago Maroons

James Austin Menaul (March 26, 1888 – October 17, 1975) was an American athlete who came fifth in the 1912 Olympic pentathlon.

== Biography ==
Menaul was born in Albuquerque, New Mexico, where his father, also named James Austin Menaul (1843–1897), was principal of Menaul School. After his father's death his mother, née Sara M. Foresman, moved the family to Chicago, where Menaul attended Englewood High School and in 1908 enrolled in the University of Chicago. Coached by Amos Alonzo Stagg, Menaul represented the Chicago Maroons in track and field and college football (1909 and 1910). In 1909 he moved into the Delta Kappa Epsilon frat house. He was 1911 Big Ten champion in shot put, despite being relatively small. He also competed in the high jump and sprint hurdles. He was lead runner on the 4 × 440 yards relay teams that won the 1910–11–12 Drake Relays and the 1911 Penn Relays, the last in 3:21.8, 1.2 s outside the world record.

In 1912 Menaul competed in the Central regional U.S. trials for the Stockholm Olympics. Stagg complained that the trials interfered with the intervarsity schedule. On 16 May he finished second (of two) in the pentathlon, behind Avery Brundage; in the decathlon on 22–23 May he finished first, ahead of Brundage and two others. The Amateur Athletic Union scored the results by sum-of-placings rather than the IAAF's newly devised scoring tables; Menaul's decathlon performance would have been a world record using the tables, though this was not realized until 1987.

At the Olympic Games, Menaul narrowly missed out on a medal in the pentathlon: he finished fifth on 30 points, one point behind third and fourth places, which were promoted to second and third when winner Jim Thorpe was disqualified (and kept their medals when he was reinstated in 1982). Menaul had injured his shoulder practicing for the javelin throw, a discipline not part of the Big Ten program, and by far his worst score at the Olympics. Lingering effects of the injury prompted him to withdraw from the Olympic decathlon.

Track and field results of J. Austin Menaud
Event	Competition	Date	Placing	Performance	Refs
Shot put	Big Ten outdoors	1909	1st	42 feet 10 inches (13.06 m)	
Shot put	Big Ten indoors	1911	1st	42 feet 8 inches (13.00 m)	
Pentathlon	Central U.S. Olympic Trials	1912	2nd		
Decathlon	Central U.S. Olympic Trials	1912	1st	7414.555 (1912 tables) / 5867 (1984 tables); 100m 11.4 — LJ 6.06 m (19 ft 11 in) — SP 12.70 m (41 ft 8 in) — HJ 1.78 m (5 ft 10 in) — 400m 53.8 — 110mH 16.6 — DT 33.00 m (108 ft 3 in) — PV 2.89 m (9 ft 6 in) — JT 40.48 m (132 ft 10 in) — 1500m 4:37.2	
Pentathlon	Olympic Games	1912	5th		

After graduation, Menaul enlisted and fought in World War I. Later he worked for publishers Scott Foresman (founded by his mother's brother) and then as a livestock buyer for Swift and Company. He married Della Patterson in 1922 and had four children, retiring in 1951 and moving to Menlo Park, California, where he died in 1975.
