= Duncan Macmillan (athlete) =

British sprinter

Personal information
- Nationality: British (English)
- Born: 1 June 1890 Nottingham, England
- Died: 15 September 1963 (aged 73) Perth, Australia

Sport
- Sport: Athletics
- Event: Sprints
- Club: University of Cambridge AC; Achilles Club

Charles Duncan Macmillan (6 January 1890 – 15 September 1963) was a British track and field athlete who competed at the 1912 Summer Olympics.

== Biography ==
Macmillan was born in Nottingham. He was educated at Trinity College, Cambridge and won his Cambridge blue from 1910 to 1912.

In 1912, he represented the Great Britain team at the 1912 Stockholm Olympics, where he was eliminated in the semi-finals of the 200 metres competition. He was also eliminated in the first round in the 100 metres event.

Macmillan died in Perth, Australia.
