= Frank McConnell =

Canadian sprinter

Frank Duncan McConnell (January 17, 1887 – April 21, 1933) was a Canadian track and field athlete, born in Deloraine, Manitoba, who competed in the 1912 Summer Olympics.

In 1912, he was eliminated in the first round of the 100 metres competition, as well as of the 200 metres event. He was also a member of the Canadian relay team, which was eliminated in the semi-finals of the 4x100 metre relay competition.
