= Frank Brown (cyclist) =

Canadian cyclist

Personal information
- Born: 11 April 1890 Newark, New Jersey, U.S.
- Died: 2 January 1969 (aged 78) York, Toronto, Ontario, Canada

Sport
- Country: Canada
- Sport: Road bicycle racing

Frank Brown (11 April 1890 – 2 January 1969) was a Canadian cyclist. He competed in the time trial event at the 1912 Summer Olympics, finishing 5th.
