= Karl Lindblom =

Swedish sprinter

Karl Lindblom (7 June 1892 – 10 January 1969) was a Swedish track and field athlete who competed in the 1912 Summer Olympics. In 1912, he was eliminated in the first round of the 200 metres competition.
