= Ferdinand Bie =

Athletics competitor

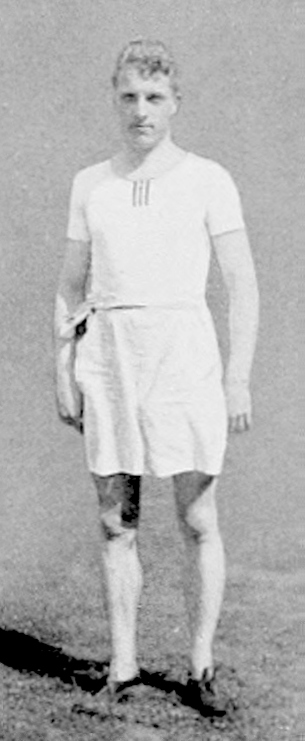
- Bie at the 1912 Olympics

Personal information
- Born: 16 February 1888 Drammen, Buskerud, Norway
- Died: 8 November 1961 (aged 73) Kristiansand, Vest-Agder, Norway
- Height: 1.74 m (5 ft 9 in)
- Weight: 72 kg (159 lb)

Sport
- Sport: Pentathlon, long jump, hurdles
- Club: Oslo IL
Medal record
Representing Norway
Olympic Games
Silver medal – second place	1912 Stockholm	Pentathlon

Ferdinand Reinhardt Bie (16 February 1888 – 9 November 1961) was a Norwegian track and field athlete. At the 1912 Summer Olympics in Stockholm, he won the silver medal in pentathlon. On winner Jim Thorpe's subsequent disqualification for having played semi-professional baseball in 1913, Bie was declared Olympic champion, but refused to accept the gold medal from the IOC. In 1982 Thorpe was reinstated as champion by the IOC; however, Bie was still listed as co-champion until the IOC announced 15 July 2022 that Thorpe's gold medal had been reinstated and Bie became the silver medalist.

He also finished eleventh in the long jump and competed in 110 metres hurdles and decathlon but failed to finish. He became Norwegian champion in long jump in 1910 and 1917 and in 110 m hurdles in 1910.
