= Donnell Young =

American sprinter

Personal information
- Born: April 25, 1888 North Hanover, Massachusetts, United States
- Died: July 28, 1989 (aged 101) Hingham, Massachusetts, United States

Sport
- Sport: Sprinting
- Event: 200 metres

Donnell Young (April 25, 1888 – July 28, 1989) was an American sprinter. He competed in the men's 200 metres at the 1912 Summer Olympics.

== See also ==
- List of centenarians (sportspeople)
