= Henry Macintosh =

Scottish track and field athlete

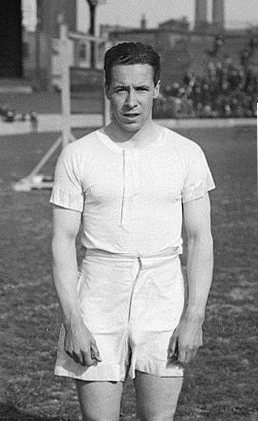
- Henry Macintosh in 1913

Personal information
- Born: 10 June 1892 Kelso, Scottish Borders, Great Britain
- Died: 26 July 1918 (aged 26) Albert, Somme, France
- Education: University of Cambridge
- Height: 1.73 m (5 ft 8 in)
- Weight: 66 kg (146 lb)

Sport
- Sport: Athletics
- Events: 100 m, 200 m
- Club: University of Cambridge

Achievements and titles
- Personal bests: 100 m – 10.7 (1913); 200 m – 22.1 (1913)
Medal record
Representing Great Britain
Olympic Games
Gold medal – first place	1912 Stockholm	4 × 100 m relay

Henry Maitland Macintosh (10 June 1892 – 26 July 1918) was a Scottish track and field athlete and winner of gold medal in 4 × 100 metres relay at the 1912 Summer Olympics.

Macintosh was born in Kelso and educated at Glenalmond College and Corpus Christi College, Cambridge. A sprinter, at the Stockholm Olympic Games, he was eliminated in the first round of the 100 metres and did not finish in the semi-final of the 200 metres. He won a gold medal in the second leg in the British 4 × 100 m relay team despite finishing second after the United States in the semifinal. The United States was later disqualified for a fault in passing the baton – the same mistake was made in the final by the world record holder and main favourite German team.

In 1913, Macintosh served as president of the Cambridge University Athletics Club, won the Scottish title, and equalled the British record for over 100 yards. He ran his last competition in 1914 and left for South Africa. After the start of World War I, he was commissioned into the Argyll and Sutherland Highlanders. He died as a captain at age 26 from wounds. He was buried in Senlis French National Cemetery.

== See also ==
- List of Olympians killed in World War I
