= John Howard (Canadian sprinter) =

Canadian track and field athlete

Personal information
- Full name: John Armstrong Howard
- Nickname: Army
- Born: October 6, 1888
- Died: January 9, 1937 (aged 48) Winnipeg, Manitoba, Canada

Sport
- Sport: Running
- Event(s): 100 metres, 200 metres

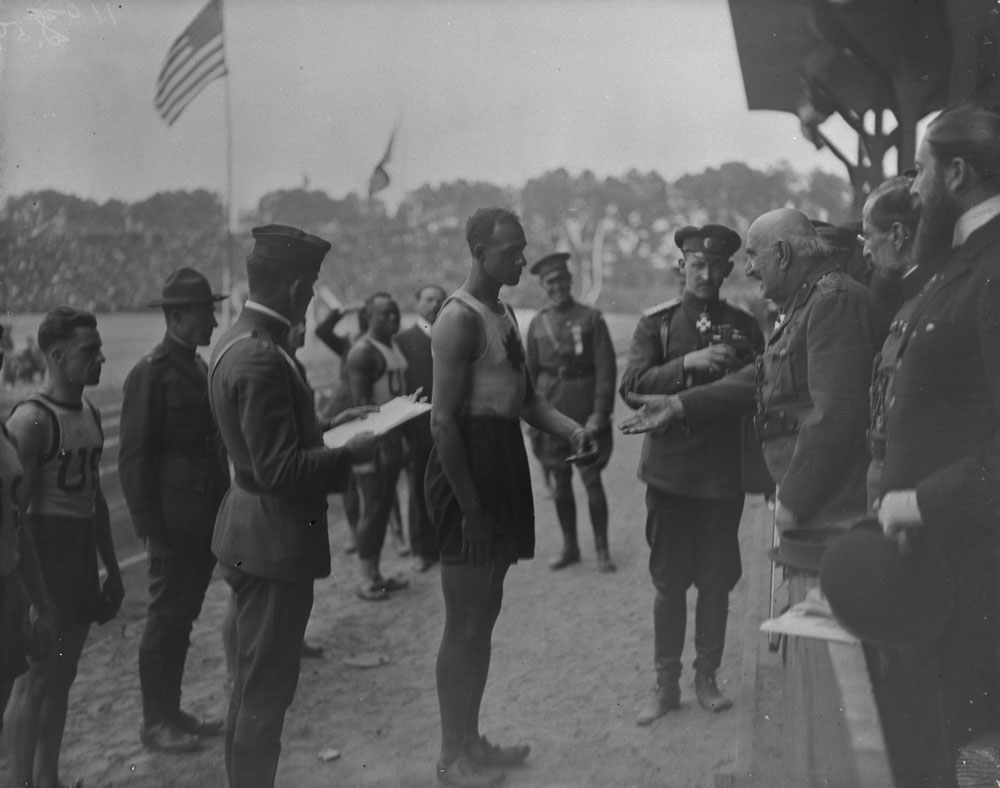
John Howard receiving his bronze medal for the 100 metres event of the Inter-Allied Games from Nicholas I of Montenegro

John Armstrong "Army" Howard (October 6, 1888 – January 9, 1937) was a Canadian track and field athlete. He was the first black Olympic athlete from Canada, competing in the 1912 Summer Olympics.

Details of Howard's early life are sparse: he may have been born in Winnipeg or in Minnesota. In addition to his domination of Canadian sprinting, he also played baseball as a catcher on the Crescent Creamery Baseball Club in Winnipeg.

Major Canadian media cited him as Canada's best gold medal hope for the 1912 Olympics. During training for the Olympics, he ran into conflicts with chief coach Walter Knox; according to the Manitoba Free Press of June 27, 1912, Knox accused Howard of insubordination, and, in an era when discrimination against black athletes was common, threatened to expel him from the team. The efforts of the Amateur Athletic Union of Canada kept Howard on the team. In the Olympics in Stockholm, he was hindered by a stomach ailment and stress resulting from discord with coach Knox. He was eliminated in the semi-finals of the 100 metres competition as well as of the 200 metres event. He was also a member of the Canadian relay teams, which were eliminated in the semi-final of the 4x100 metre relay competition and in the first round of the 4x400 metre relay event.

During World War I, he served as a sapper with the Canadian Railway Troop, then transferred to the 11th and 18th Canadian Reserve Battalions and later served with the Canadian Army Medical Corps, most likely as a stretcher-bearer. He competed in the 1919 Inter-Allied Games held in Paris where he won the bronze medal in the 100 metres race.

He returned to Canada about two years after going to Europe with a white English wife, Edith (née Lipscomb). They homesteaded in Ste. Rose du Lac, north of Winnipeg, but were forced to leave by hostility to the interracial marriage. Howard found work as a railway porter. Later, the marriage broke up.

He is the grandfather of Olympic sprinters Harry Jerome and Valerie Jerome.

In 2000, John Howard was inducted into the Manitoba Sports Hall of Fame and Museum.
