= James Donahue (athlete) =

American pentathlete (1885–1966)

Olympic medal record

Men's athletics

Representing the United States
| Silver medal – second place | 1912 Stockholm | Pentathlon |

James Joseph Donahue (April 20, 1885, Brooklyn – March 15, 1966, Glen Rock, New Jersey) was an American athlete who competed mainly in the pentathlon. He competed in the pentathlon for the United States team during the 1912 Summer Olympics held in Stockholm, Sweden where he won the bronze medal. On winner Jim Thorpe's subsequent disqualification for playing semi-professional baseball in 1913, Donahue was declared vice-champion (silver medalist). In 1982 Thorpe was reinstated as champion by the IOC; however, Donahue was still to be considered vice-champion (silver medalist).
