= Knut Lindberg =

Swedish athlete

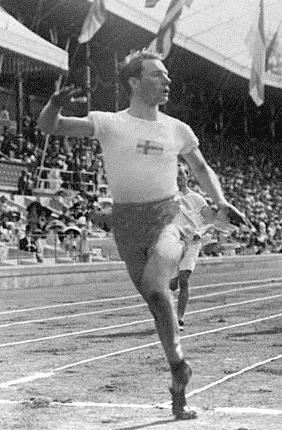
- Knut Lindberg running 100 m at the 1912 Olympics

Personal information
- Born: 2 February 1882 Gothenburg, Sweden
- Died: 6 April 1961 (aged 69) Gothenburg, Sweden
- Height: 1.79 m (5 ft 10 in)
- Weight: 72 kg (159 lb)

Sport
- Sport: Athletics, soccer
- Events: 100 m, 200 m, javelin throw
- Club: Örgryte IS, Göteborg

Achievements and titles
- Personal bests: 100 m – 10.6 (1906); 200 m – 22.3e (1912); JT – 45.17 m (1906)
Medal record
Men's athletics
Representing Sweden
Intercalated Games
Silver medal – second place	1906 Athens	Javelin throw
Olympic Games
Silver medal – second place	1912 Stockholm	4×100 m relay

Knut Andreas "Knatten" Lindberg (2 February 1882 – 6 April 1961) was a Swedish sprinter, javelin thrower, and soccer player who competed in athletics the 1906 Intercalated Games and the 1908 and 1912 Summer Olympics. He had his best results in 1906 when he won a silver medal in javelin throw and finished fifth in ancient pentathlon and sixth in the 100 m race. He won another silver medal in 1912, with the Swedish 4 × 100 m relay team, but failed to reach the finals in all his other events in 1908 and 1912, which included sprint and javelin throw.

Lindberg won 15 national athletics titles: nine over 100 m (1902, 1904–1909, 1911 and 1912); three over 200 m (1908–1909 and 1912) and three over 110 m hurdles (1907–1909). He was also a defender on the Örgryte IS football team that won the Swedish championships in 1902 and 1904–1907. In 1910, he beat a taxi driver to death, but his defense lawyer managed to lower his sentence to seven months.
