= Ivan Möller =

Swedish athletics competitor

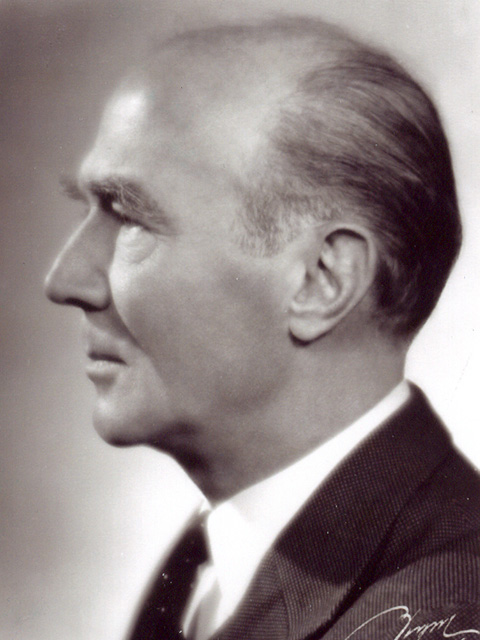

Personal information
- Born: 12 February 1884 Gothenburg, Sweden
- Died: 31 July 1972 (aged 88) Gothenburg, Sweden

Sport
- Sport: Athletics
- Events: 100 m, 200 m, 110m hurdles, high jump
- Club: Örgryte IS, Göteborg

Achievements and titles
- Personal bests: 100 m – 10.8 (1911); 200 m – 22.4e (1912); 110 mH – 15.9 (1911); HJ – 1.80 m (1910)
Medal record
Representing Sweden
Olympic Games
Silver medal – second place	1912 Stockholm	4×100 m relay

Ivan Möller (12 February 1884 – 31 July 1972) was a Swedish sprint runner, hurdler and high jumper. He competed at the 1912 Summer Olympics held in Stockholm in the 100 m, 200 m and 4 × 100 m relay. He won a silver medal in the relay but failed to reach the finals in his individual events.

Nationally, Möller won eleven Swedish titles: in the 200 m in 1911, in the 110 m hurdles in 1910–12, in the high jump in 1909 (twice), and in the 4 × 100 m relay in 1907 and 1909–1912.
