= Seppo Lindblom =

Finnish banker and politician (1935–2026)

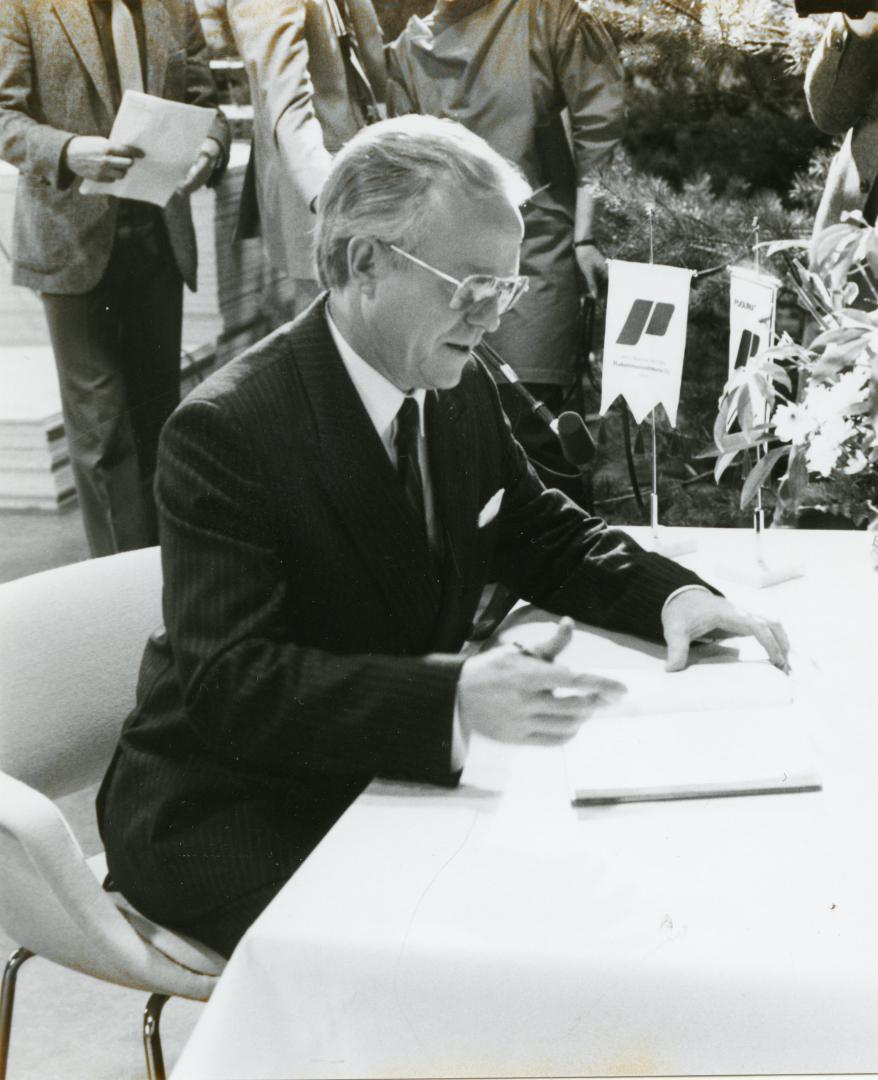
Seppo Lindblom in 1984

Seppo Olavi Lindblom (9 August 1935 – 15 September 2026) was a Finnish banker and politician from the Social Democratic Party.

== Life and career ==
Seppo Olavi Lindblom was born Helsinki on 9 August 1935, a son of trade unionist Olavi Lindblom. His daughter is the educationalist and university rector Sari Lindblom.

Lindblom was Secretary of State 1968–1970 of Prime Minister Mauno Koivisto, and director of the Labor Movement Economic Research Institute 1970–1972 and a director in the Ministry of Finance of Finland 1973–1974. He became the Minister of Trade and Industry in 1972 and again from 1983 to 1987.

He was appointed director to the Bank of Finland in 1974 and was a member of its executive board since 1982. Lindblom was appointed the CEO of Postipankki in 1988, a post he had to leave in 1995 because of the difficulties during the Finnish banking crisis of 1990s.

In 2002, he completed a doctorate on social sciences with a thesis about the challenges of Nordic welfare state. He was the chairman of the board of Invest in Finland 2000–2004.

Lindblom died in Espoo on 15 September 2026, at the age of 91.
