= Ture Persson =

Swedish sprinter

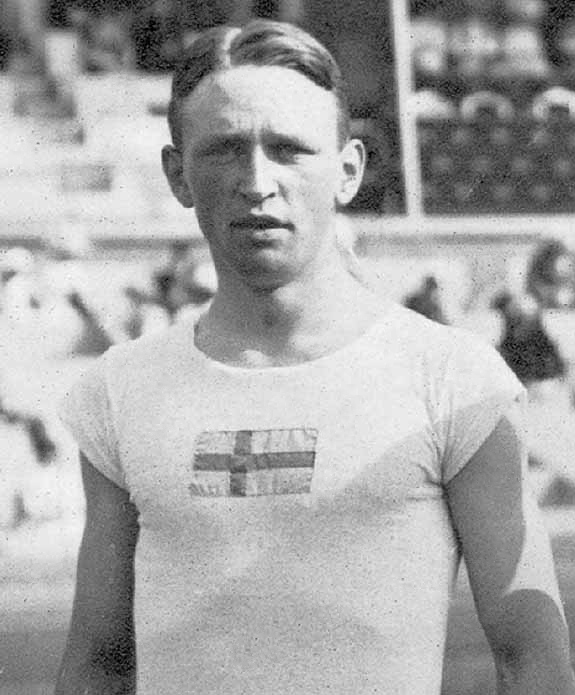
- Persson at the 1912 Olympics

Personal information
- Born: 23 November 1892 Kristianstad, Sweden
- Died: 14 November 1956 (aged 63) Bromma, Stockholm, Sweden
- Height: 188 cm (6 ft 2 in)
- Weight: 80 kg (176 lb)

Sport
- Sport: Athletics
- Event: Sprint
- Club: Malmö Läroverks IF

Achievements and titles
- Personal bests: 100 m – 10.8 (1913); 200 m – 22.2 (1911); 400 m – 51.0 (1913)
Medal record
Representing Sweden
Olympic Games
Silver medal – second place	1912 Stockholm	4×100 m relay

Per Fredrik Ture Person (23 November 1892 – 14 November 1956) was a Swedish sprinter who won a silver medal in the 4 × 100 m relay at the 1912 Summer Olympics. He failed to reach the finals of individual 100 m and 200 m events.
