= James Kenyon (sport shooter) =

Canadian sports shooter

Personal information
- Born: 23 July 1875 Oldham, England
- Died: 23 July 1935 (aged 60) Montreal, Quebec, Canada

Sport
- Sport: Sports shooting

James Kenyon (23 July 1875 – 23 July 1935) was a Canadian sports shooter. He competed in the men's trap event at the 1912 Summer Olympics.
