= Olavi Lindblom =

Finnish trade union leader and politician (1911–1990)

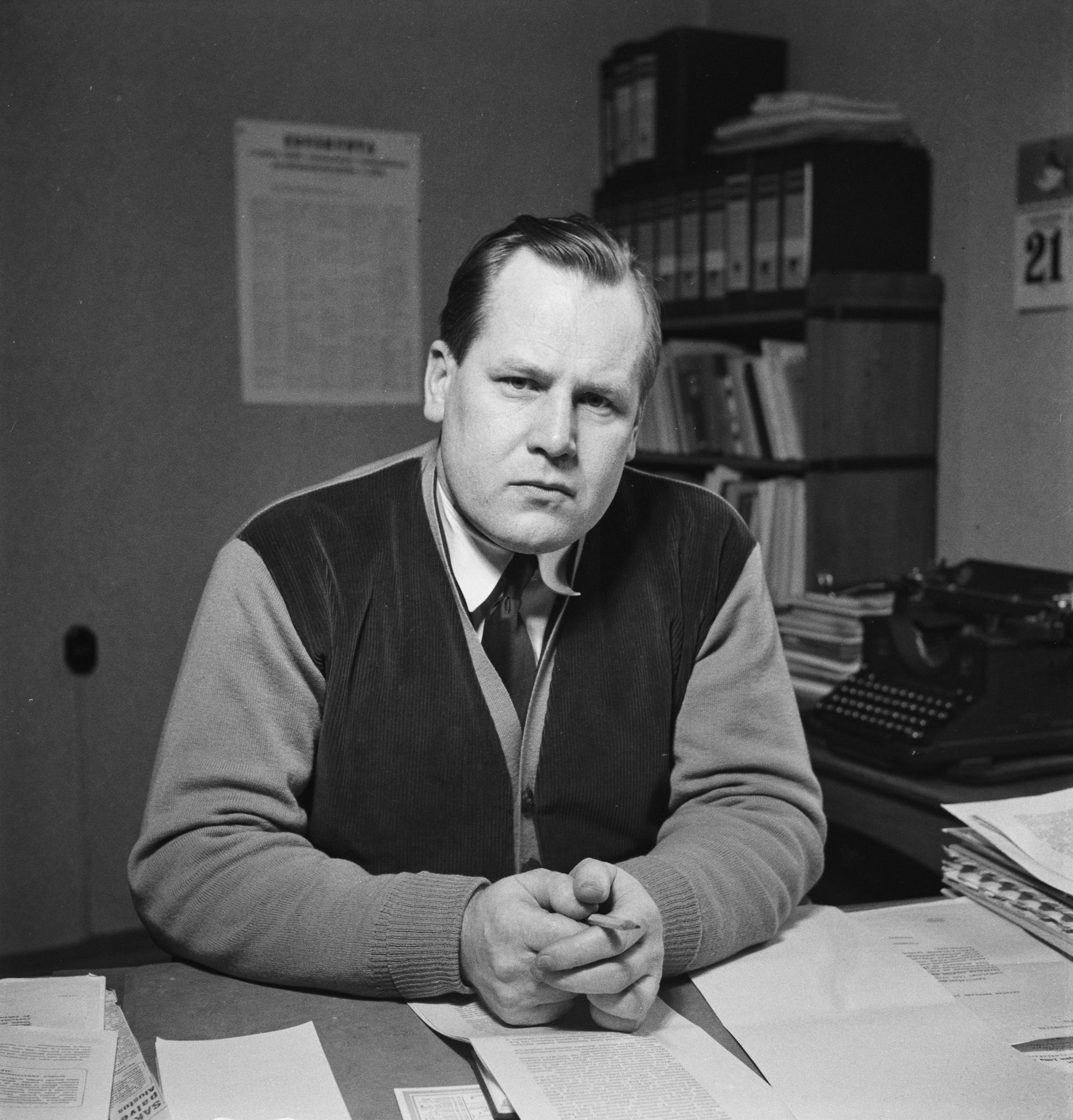
Olavi Lindblom in 1951

Olavi Lindblom (11 December 1911 – 13 August 1990) was a Finnish trade union leader and politician, born in Helsinki. He was a member of the Parliament of Finland from 1954 to 1966, representing the Social Democratic Party of Finland (SDP). He served as Deputy Minister of Transport and Public Works from 29 August 1958 to 13 January 1959. He was a presidential elector in the 1956 and 1962 presidential elections. He was the father of Seppo Lindblom.
