= Gustav Krojer =

Austrian sportsman (1885–1945)

Personal information
- Born: 30 June 1885 Vienna, Austria-Hungary
- Died: 30 January 1945 (aged 59) Vienna, Nazi Germany

Sport
- Country: Austria
- Sport: Track and field, Football

Gustav Krojer (30 June 1885 – 30 January 1945) was an Austrian track and field athlete who competed in the 1906 Intercalated Games and the 1912 Summer Olympics, he also appeared twice for the Austria national football team.

== Athletics ==
Krojer competed at the 1906 Austrian Olympic selection competition, and he won in the 100 metres and the triple jump and finished second in the long jump, high jump and the standing high jump, so off he went to the 1906 Intercalated Games being held in Athens, Greece. At the Games, he competed in seven events in total, one on the track, five in the field, and also competed in the pentathlon; his best finish at the Games was in the standing high jump, where he finished ninth, although only ten athletes competed.

Six years later and now 26 years old, Krojer was competing at the 1912 Summer Olympics; this time, he only entered four events, and he failed to reach any finals again.

Krojer was national champion in the javelin throw in 1911 and the high jump in 1913.

== Football ==
Krojer also played football; he was a defender; between 1907 and 1913, he played for Wiener Sport-Club, and in 1911 he was called up for international duty and played twice against Hungary, winning the first game at home 3-1 in a friendly, then losing the return match later in the year 0-2.

On 30 January 1945, Krojer died in Vienna, Austria (at the time part of Nazi Germany).
