= Georges Rolot =

French sprinter

Personal information
- Nationality: French
- Born: 10 May 1889
- Died: 31 December 1977 (aged 88)

Sport
- Sport: Sprinting
- Event: 100 metres

Georges Rolot (French: [ʁɔlo]; 10 May 1889 – 31 December 1977) was a French sprinter. He competed in the men's 100 metres at the 1912 Summer Olympics.
