= Julius Wagner (athlete) =

German sportsman (1882–1952)

- Full name: Bruno Julius Wagner
- Born: 12 October 1882 Reutlingen, German Empire
- Died: 2 March 1952 (aged 69) Bern, Switzerland
- Height: 1.85 m (6 ft 1 in)

Gymnastics career
- Discipline: Men's artistic gymnastics
- Country represented: Germany
- Gym: Turnverein Reutlingen
Medal record
Tug of war
Representing Germany
Intercalated Games
| Gold medal – first place | 1906 Athens | Tug of war |

Bruno Julius Wagner (12 October 1882 – 2 March 1952) was a German athlete and gymnast who competed for Germany and Switzerland in the Olympic Games.

In 1906 he competed for Germany at the Intercalated Olympic Games, winning a team gold medal in tug of war and participating in seven athletics events and three gymnastics events. Representing Switzerland, he competed in the men's hammer throw at the 1908 Summer Olympics and the men's pentathlon at the 1912 Summer Olympics.
