= Charles Luther (sprinter) =

Swedish sprinter

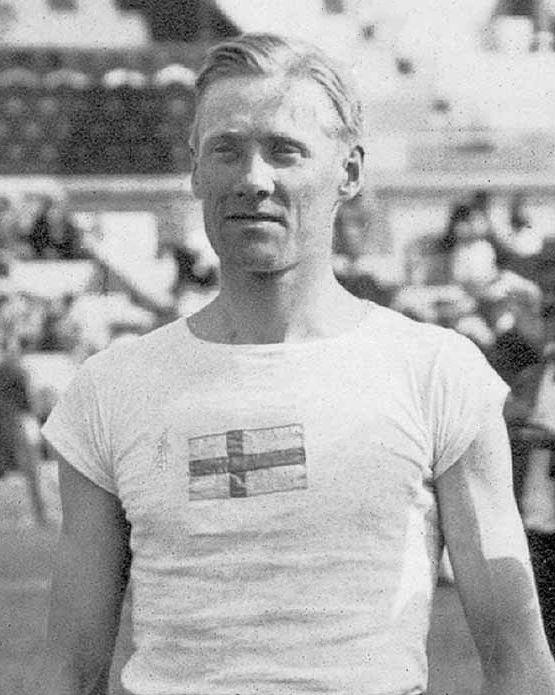
- Luther at the 1912 Olympics

Personal information
- Born: 8 August 1885 Gothenburg, Sweden
- Died: 24 January 1962 (aged 76) Härlanda, Gothenburg, Sweden
- Height: 179 cm (5 ft 10 in)
- Weight: 64 kg (141 lb)

Sport
- Sport: Athletics
- Event: Sprint
- Club: IFK Göteborg

Achievements and titles
- Personal bests: 100 m – 10.9 (1913); 200 m – 22.3e (1912)
Medal record
Representing Sweden
Olympic Games
| Silver medal – second place | 1912 Stockholm | 4×100 m relay |

Karl August "Charles" Luther (8 August 1885 – 24 January 1962) was a Swedish sprinter who won a silver medal in the 4 × 100 m relay at the 1912 Summer Olympics. He failed to reach the finals of individual 100 m and 200 m events.
