= Harry Beasley (athlete) =

Canadian sprinter

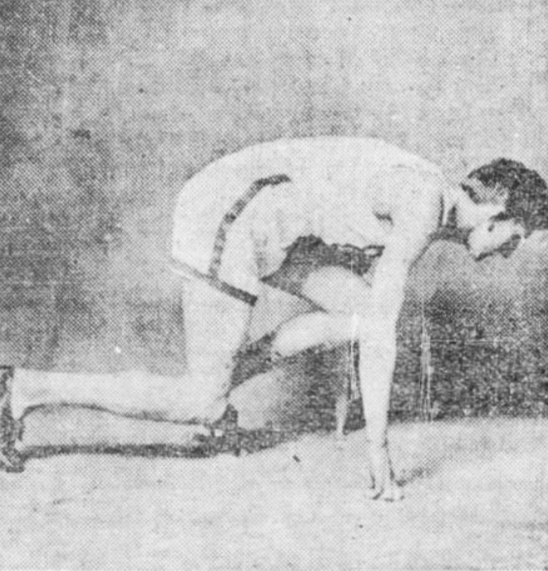

Personal information
- Nationality: Canadian
- Born: 14 March 1892 Donald, British Columbia, Canada
- Died: 26 November 1972 (aged 80) Victoria, British Columbia, Canada

Sport
- Sport: Sprinting
- Event: 100 metres
- Club: James Bay Athletic Association, Victoria

Harry Beasley (14 March 1892 – 26 November 1972) was a Canadian sprinter. He competed in the men's 100 metres at the 1912 Summer Olympics.
