= Frank Lukeman =

Canadian athlete

Francis Lukeman
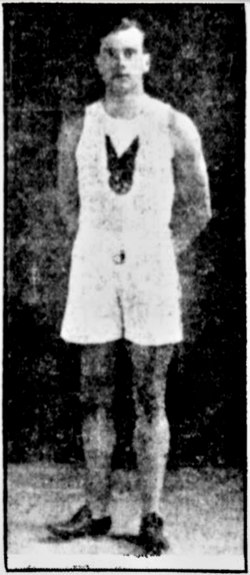
- Photo from Ottawa Citizen, Nov. 2, 1910

Personal information
- Full name: Francis Lawrence Lukeman
- Nickname: Frank
- Born: June 20, 1885 Montreal, Quebec, Canada
- Died: December 26, 1946 (aged 61) Montreal, Quebec, Canada
- Height: 5 ft 10 in (1.78 m)

Sport
- Country: Canada
- Sport: Track and Field
- Event(s): Pentathlon, 200 metres, 100 metres

Achievements and titles
- Olympic finals: 1908 Summer Olympics, 1912 Summer Olympics
Medal record
Men's athletics
Bronze medal – third place	1912 Stockholm	Pentathlon
- Updated on 17 November 2012

Francis Lawrence Lukeman (June 20, 1885 – December 23, 1946), was a Canadian athlete. He was born in Montreal, Quebec.

== Biography ==
In Stockholm at the 1912 Summer Olympics Lukeman finished fourth in the pentathlon but was awarded the bronze medal after Jim Thorpe of the United States was disqualified from the gold medal. Thorpe's disqualification was eventually overturned but Lukeman were permitted to retain his bronze medal.

In the 100 metres at the 1908 Summer Olympics in London Lukeman took second place in his first-round heat with a time of 11.7 seconds. He did not advance to the semifinals.

He won in his preliminary heat of the 200 metres, placing first overall.

Lukeman served in the Canadian Expeditionary Force in World War I, at various times in the 3rd Regiment Victoria Rifles of Canada, 14th Battalion (Royal Montreal Regiment), CEF, 242nd Battalion, CEF, which was absorbed into the Canadian Forestry Corps, where he served out the end of the war as an (Acting) Regimental Sergeant Major. He returned to Montreal after the war. "In his combat overseas, he was gassed twice. In 1945, he had his leg amputated and remained bedridden at the Sainte-Anne-de-Bellevue Military Hospital (Ste. Anne's Hospital), dying in 1946."
