= Athletics at the 1912 Summer Olympics – Men's 800 metres =

Men's 800 metres at the Games of the V Olympiad
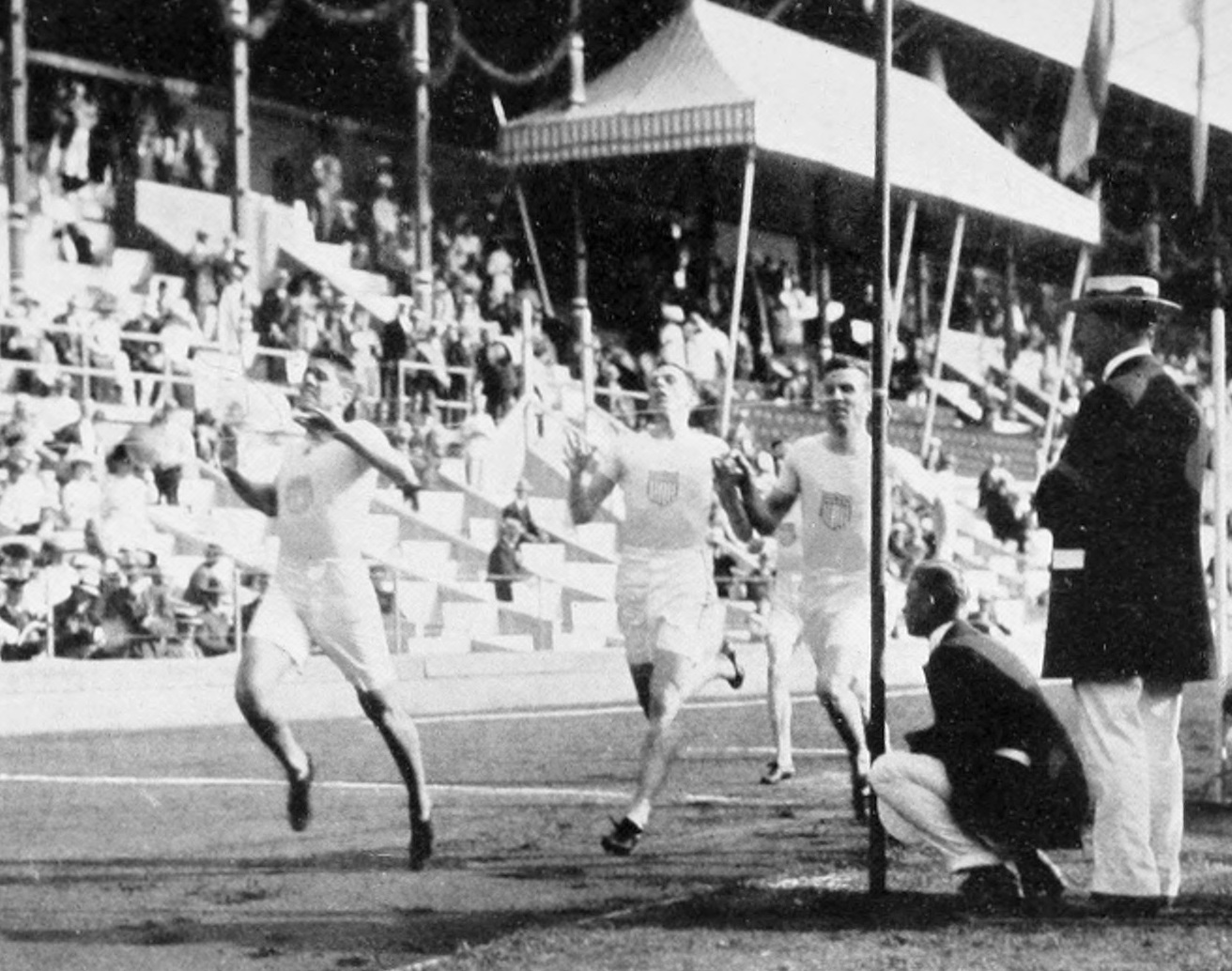
- The finish, with Ted Meredith setting a new world record.
- Venue: Stockholm Olympic Stadium
- Dates: July 6, 1912 (heats); July 7, 1912 (semifinals); July 8, 1912 (final)
- Competitors: 47 from 16 nations
- Winning time: 1:51.9 WR

Medalists
1st place, gold medalist(s)		Ted Meredith	United States
2nd place, silver medalist(s)		Mel Sheppard	United States
3rd place, bronze medalist(s)		Ira Davenport	United States

The men's 800 metres at the 1912 Summer Olympics was the event’s fifth appearance, remaining one of 12 athletics disciplines contested at every games. The competition was held from Saturday, July 6, 1912, to Monday, July 8, 1912. Forty-seven runners from 16 nations competed. NOCs could enter up to 12 athletes. The event was won by Ted Meredith of the United States, the nation's third consecutive victory in the 800 metres. Mel Sheppard became the first man to win two medals in the event, coming in second to miss out on defending his 1908 gold. Ira Davenport completed the United States sweep, the second time the Americans had swept the 800 metres podium (after 1904).

== Background ==
This was the fifth appearance of the event, which is one of 12 athletics events to have been held at every Summer Olympics. All three medalists from 1908, Olympic champion Mel Sheppard, the silver medalist Emilio Lunghi, and the bronze medalist Hanns Braun, returned. Sheppard was among the favorites with a chance to repeat; other prominent challengers were his teammates John Paul Jones and Ted Meredith as well as Lunghi (who had matched Sheppard's world record) and Braun (the 1911 and 1912 AAA champion).

Chile, Norway, Portugal, Russia, South Africa, and Turkey appeared in the event for the first time. Germany, Great Britain, Hungary, and the United States each made their fourth appearance, tied for the most among all nations.

== Competition format ==
The competition expanded to three rounds for the first time. There were nine first-round heats of between 4 and 8 athletes each; the top two runners in each heat advanced to the semifinals. There were two semifinals with 9 athletes each; the top four runners in each semifinal advanced to the eight-man final.

== Records ==
These were the standing world and Olympic records (in minutes) prior to the 1912 Summer Olympics.

World record	Mel Sheppard (USA)	1:52.8 (u)(*)	London, United Kingdom	21 July 1908
Olympic record	Mel Sheppard (USA)	1:52.8(*)	St. Louis, United States	21 July 1908

(*) This track was 536.45 metres=1/3 mile in circumference.

The world record of 1:52.8, which had seemed fairly safe through the first two rounds of competition, was broken by all three medalists and tied by the fourth-place runner in the final. David Caldwell tied the old record, while Mel Sheppard, the previous record-holder, and Ira Davenport beat the old record by .8 seconds at 1:52.0, taking silver and bronze behind Ted Meredith and his new record of 1:51.9. This record became the first official world record for the 800 metres.

== Schedule ==
Date	Time	Round
Saturday, 6 July 1912	14:45	Round 1
Sunday, 7 July 1912		Semifinals
Monday, 8 July 1912	17:00	Final

== Results ==
=== Heats ===
All heats were held on Saturday, July 6, 1912.

==== Heat 1 ====
Rank	Athlete	Nation	Time	Notes
1	David Caldwell	United States	1:58.6	Q
2	Emilio Lunghi	Italy	Unknown	Q
3	Walter McClure	United States	Unknown	
4	Eric Lindholm	Sweden	2:01.5	
5	Joseph Caullé	France	Unknown	

==== Heat 2 ====
Rank	Athlete	Nation	Time	Notes
1	Percy Mann	Great Britain	1:56.0	Q
2	Herbert Putnam	United States	Unknown	Q
3	Jacob Pedersen	Norway	Unknown	
—	Leopoldo Palma	Chile	DNF	

==== Heat 3 ====
Rank	Athlete	Nation	Time	Notes
1	John Paul Jones	United States	2:01.8	Q
2	Armando Cortesão	Portugal	Unknown	Q
3	Oscar Larsen	Norway	Unknown	
4	Guido Calvi	Italy	Unknown	

==== Heat 4 ====
Rank	Athlete	Nation	Time	Notes
1	Clarence Edmundson	United States	1:56.5	Q
2	John Tait	Canada	Unknown	Q
3	Charles Poulenard	France	Unknown	
4	Willie Jahn	Germany	2:02.0	
—	Robert Burton	Great Britain	DNF	

==== Heat 5 ====
Rank	Athlete	Nation	Time	Notes
1	Ira Davenport	United States	1:59.0	Q
2	Frederick Hulford	Great Britain	Unknown	Q
3	Ödön Bodor	Hungary	Unknown	
4	Jacques Person	Germany	Unknown	
5	Dmitry Nazarov	Russia	Unknown	
—	Zdeněk Městecký	Bohemia	DNF	
—	Philip Baker	Great Britain	DNF	

==== Heat 6 ====
Rank	Athlete	Nation	Time	Notes
1	Harlan Holden	United States	1:58.1	Q
2	Evert Björn	Sweden	Unknown	Q
3	Richard Yorke	Great Britain	Unknown	
4	Karl Haglund	Sweden	2:01.2	
5-7	Ferenc Forgács	Hungary	Unknown	
5-7	Aleksandr Yelizarov	Russia	Unknown	
5-7	Federico Mueller	Chile	Unknown	
—	Vahram Papazian	Turkey	DNF	

==== Heat 7 ====
Rank	Athlete	Nation	Time	Notes
1	James Soutter	Great Britain	2:00.4	Q
2	Mel Sheppard	United States	Unknown	Q
3	Erich Lehmann	Germany	Unknown	
—	János Antal	Hungary	DNF	
—	Johannes Leopold Villemson	Russia	DNS	

==== Heat 8 ====
Rank	Athlete	Nation	Time	Notes
1	Mel Brock	Canada	1:57.0	Q
2	Ted Meredith	United States	Unknown	Q
3	John Victor	South Africa	Unknown	
—	Alan Patterson	Great Britain	DNF	

==== Heat 9 ====
Rank	Athlete	Nation	Time	Notes
1	Ernest Henley	Great Britain	1:57.6	Q
2	Hanns Braun	Germany	Unknown	Q
3	Erik Frisell	Sweden	1:59.2	
4	Thomas Halpin	United States	1:59.2	
—	Lauri Pihkala	Finland	DNF	
—	Károly Radóczy	Hungary	DNF	

=== Semifinals ===
Both semi-finals were held on Sunday, July 7, 1912. Jones withdrew to focus on the 1500 metres.

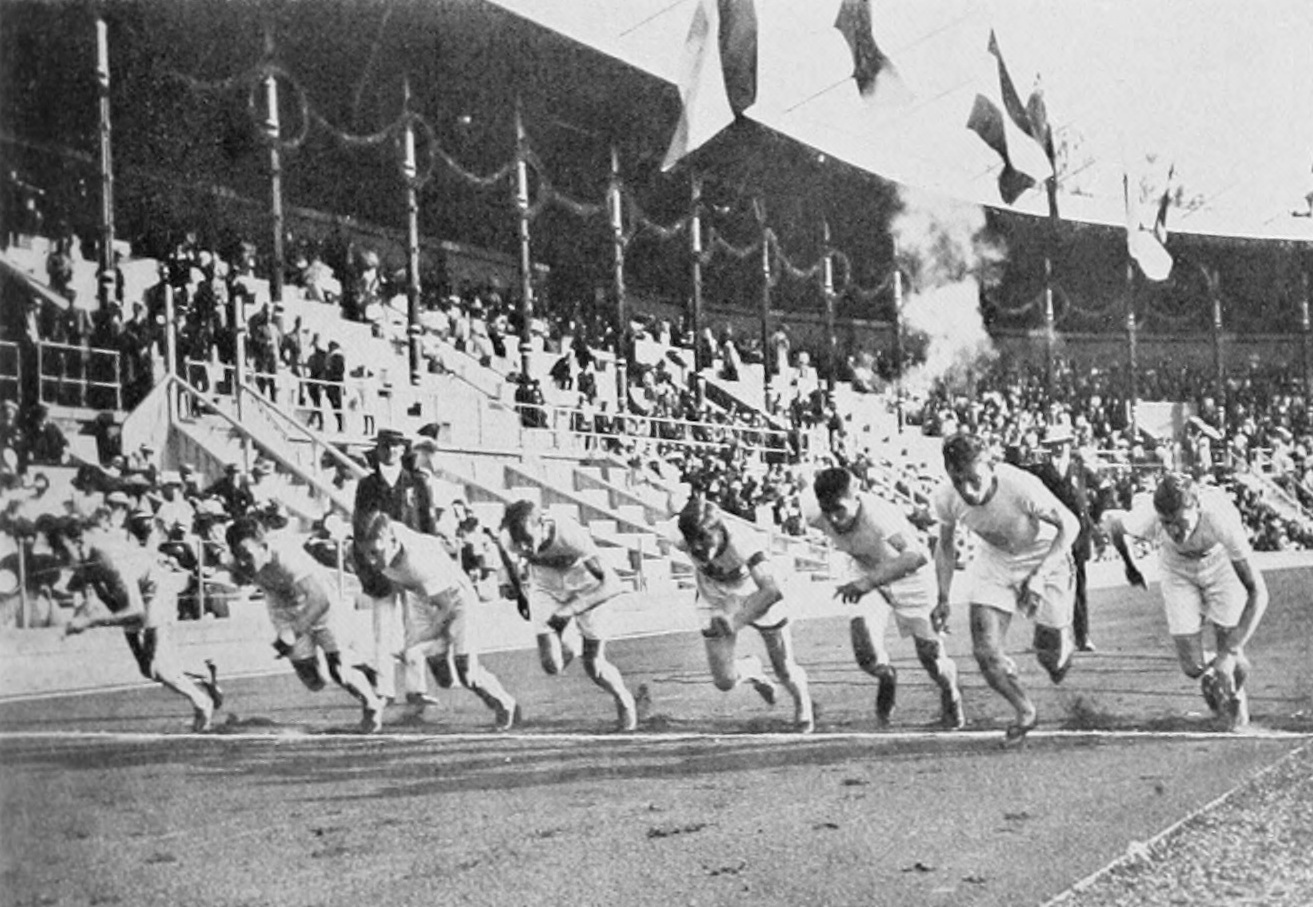
The start of the final.

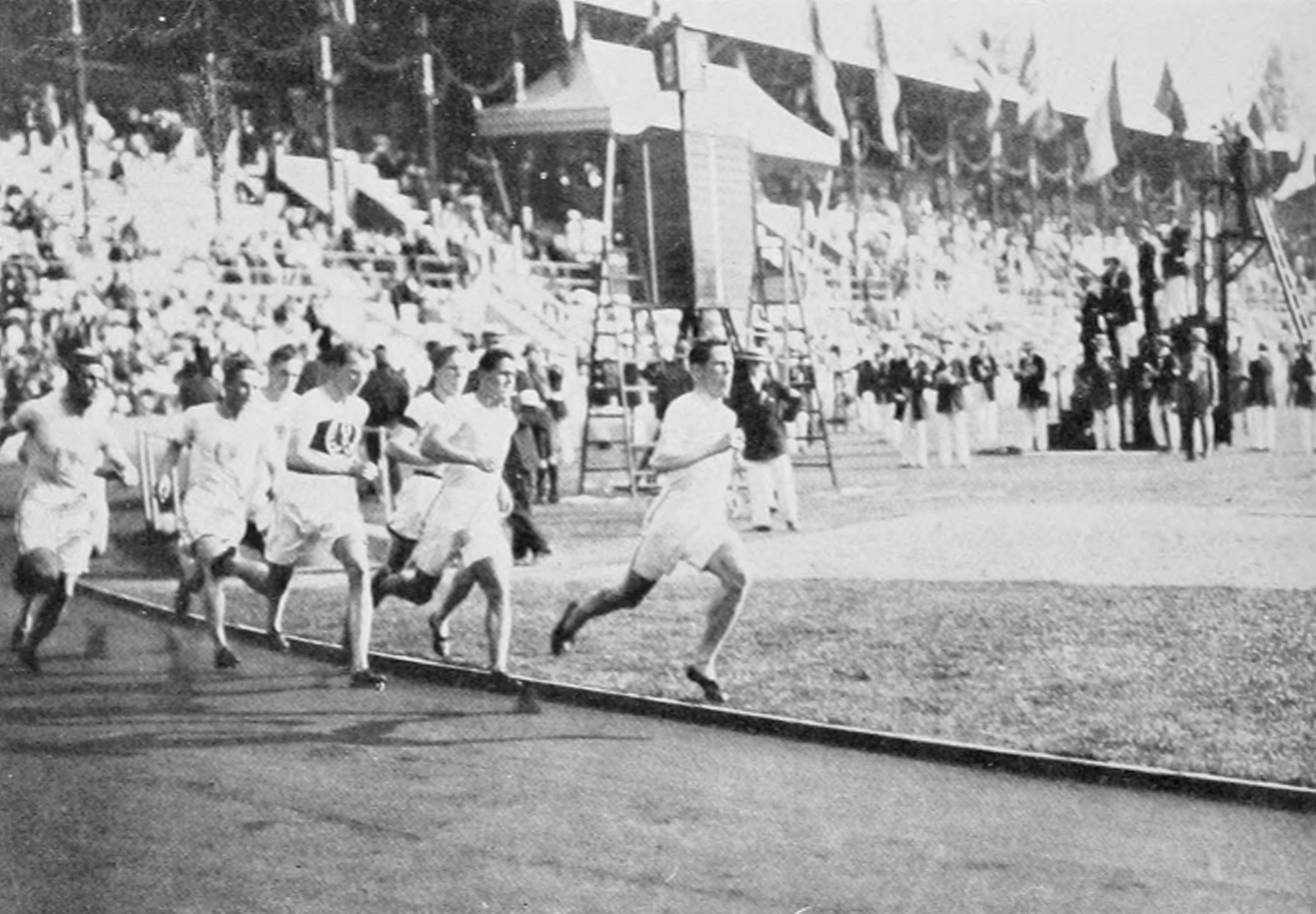
The final under way.

==== Semifinal 1 ====
Rank	Athlete	Nation	Time	Notes
1	Ted Meredith	United States	1:54.4	Q
2	Hanns Braun	Germany	1:54.6	Q
3	Mel Sheppard	United States	1:54.8	Q
4	Herbert Putnam	United States	1:55.0	Q
5	John Tait	Canada	Unknown	
6	Percy Mann	Great Britain	Unknown	
—	Frederick Hulford	Great Britain	DNF	
—	James Soutter	Great Britain	DNF	
—	John Paul Jones	United States	DNS	

==== Semifinal 2 ====
Rank	Athlete	Nation	Time	Notes
1	Mel Brock	Canada	1:55.7	Q
2	Clarence Edmundson	United States	1:55.8	Q
3	David Caldwell	United States	1:55.9	Q
4	Ira Davenport	United States	1:55.9	Q
5	Emilio Lunghi	Italy	Unknown	
6-9	Evert Björn	Sweden	Unknown	
6-9	Ernest Henley	Great Britain	Unknown	
6-9	Harlan Holden	United States	Unknown	
6-9	Armando Cortesão	Portugal	Unknown	

=== Final ===
The final took place on Monday, July 8, 1912.

Rank	Athlete	Nation	Time	Notes
1st place, gold medalist(s)	Ted Meredith	United States	1:51.9	WR
2nd place, silver medalist(s)	Mel Sheppard	United States	1:52.0	
3rd place, bronze medalist(s)	Ira Davenport	United States	1:52.0	
4	David Caldwell	United States	1:52.8	
5	Mel Brock	Canada	1:53.0	
6	Hanns Braun	Germany	1:53.0	
7	Clarence Edmundson	United States	Unknown	
8	Herbert Putnam	United States	Unknown	
