= Athletics at the 1912 Summer Olympics – Men's 1500 metres =

Men's 1500 metres at the Games of the V Olympiad
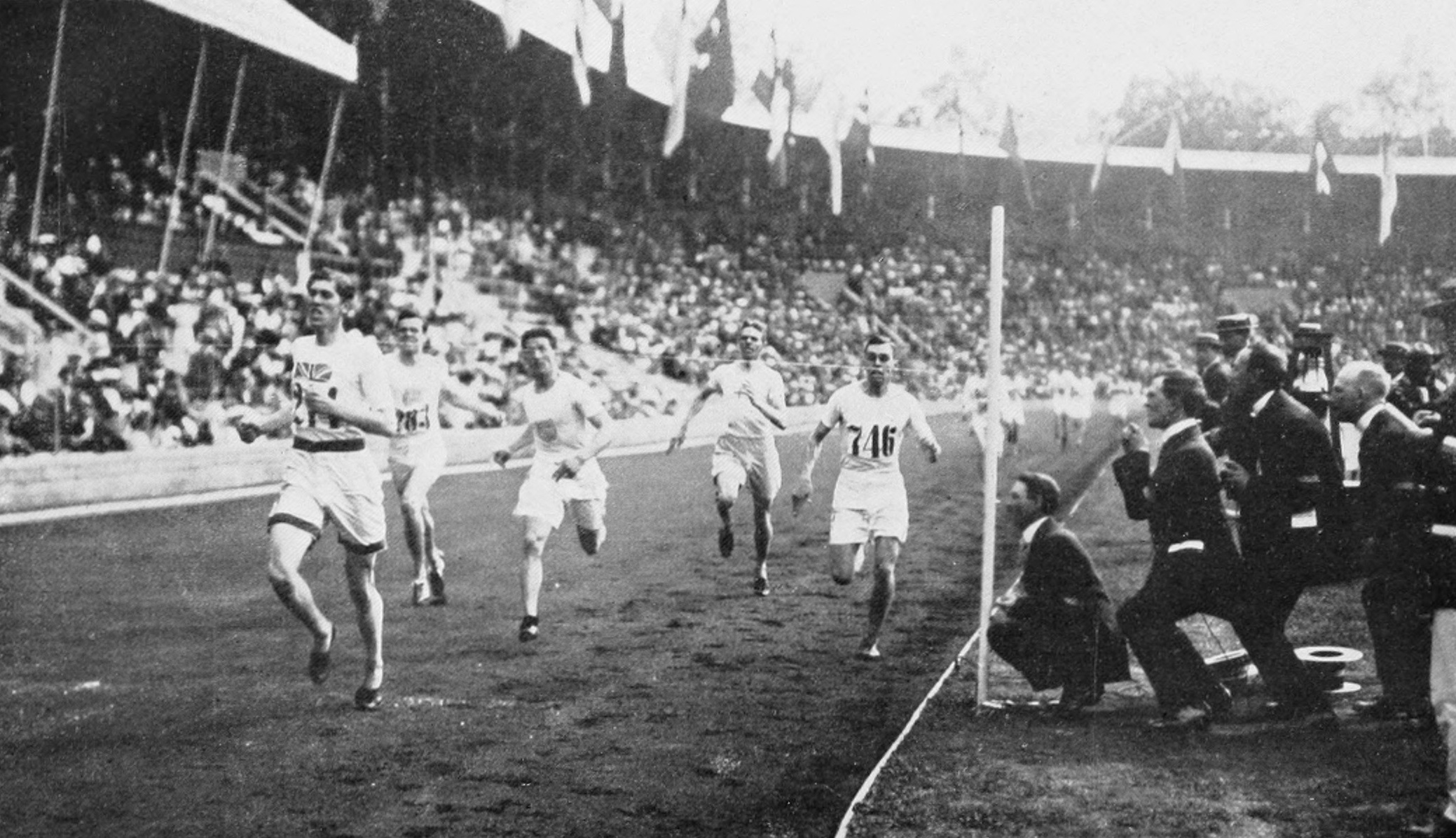
- The finish with Arnold Jackson setting a new Olympic record.
- Venue: Stockholm Olympic Stadium
- Dates: July 9, 1912 (semifinals); July 10, 1912 (final)
- Competitors: 45 from 14 nations
- Winning time: 3:56.8 OR

Medalists
1st place, gold medalist(s)		Arnold Jackson; Great Britain
2nd place, silver medalist(s)		Abel Kiviat; United States
3rd place, bronze medalist(s)		Norman Taber; United States

The men's 1500 metres was a track and field athletics event held as part of the athletics at the 1912 Summer Olympics programme. The competition was held on Tuesday, July 9, 1912, and on Wednesday, July 10, 1912. Forty-five runners from 14 nations competed, including the Olympic champion from 1908, Mel Sheppard. NOCs could enter up to 12 athletes.

Arnold Jackson won the final by 0.1 second, ahead of an American trio, in what was acclaimed at the time as "the greatest race ever run". Aged 21, he remains the youngest ever winner of this event.

1912 was the last Olympics where "private entries" were allowed (i.e. not part of a country's officially selected team), and Jackson was one of these; his medal is credited to the United Kingdom. It was the second victory for Great Britain in the event, after 1900.

== Background ==
This was the fifth appearance of the event, which is one of 12 athletics events to have been held at every Summer Olympics. Two finalists from 1908 returned: gold medalist Mel Sheppard of the United States and fourth-place finisher John Tait of Canada. Sheppard was among the favorites, along with countrymen John Paul Jones, Norman Taber, and Abel Kiviat, as well as Arnold Jackson of Great Britain. Kiviat had broken the world record three times in May and June 1912.

Russia, South Africa, and Turkey each made their first appearance in the event. The United States made its fifth appearance, the only nation to have competed in the men's 1500 metres at each Games to that point.

== Competition format ==
The competition consisted of two rounds, as in 1908. Seven semifinals were held, with anywhere between 3 and 8 runners in each. The top two runners in each heat advanced to the final, making a large (14 runners, compared to 8 or 9 in previous Games) final race.

== Records ==
These were the standing world and Olympic records prior to the 1912 Summer Olympics.

World record	Abel Kiviat (USA)	3:55.8	Cambridge, United States	8 June 1912
Olympic record	Norman Hallows (GBR)	4:03.4	London, United Kingdom	13 July 1908

Abel Kiviat finished his semifinal only 1 second off the Olympic record time of 4:03.4; he and all six other finalists whose times are known broke that mark in the final. Kiviat took second behind Arnold Jackson, who set the new record at 3:56.8.

== Schedule ==
Date	Time	Round
Tuesday, 9 July 1912	14:30	Semifinals
Wednesday, 10 July 1912	15:30	Final

== Results ==
=== Semifinals ===
All semi-finals were held on Tuesday, July 9, 1912.

==== Semifinal 1 ====
Rank	Athlete	Nation	Time	Notes
1	Mel Sheppard	United States	4:27.6	Q
2	Louis Madeira	United States	4:27.9	Q
3	Albert Hare	Great Britain	4:39.4	

==== Semifinal 2 ====
Rank	Athlete	Nation	Time	Notes
1	Norman Taber	United States	4:25.5	Q
2	Philip Baker	Great Britain	4:26.0	Q
3	Georg Amberger	Germany	4:27.0	
4–5	Teofil Savniky	Hungary	Unknown	
4–5	Rūdolfs Vītols	Russia	Unknown	
—	Dmitri Nazarov	Russia	DNF	

==== Semifinal 3 ====
Rank	Athlete	Nation	Time	Notes
1	Abel Kiviat	United States	4:04.4	Q
2	Henri Arnaud	France	4:05.4	Q
3	Norman Patterson	United States	4:05.5	
4	John Tait	Canada	Unknown	
5	Ferenc Forgács	Hungary	Unknown	
6–7	François Delloye	Belgium	Unknown	
6–7	Jacob Pedersen	Norway	Unknown	
—	Edward Owen	Great Britain	DNF	

==== Semifinal 4 ====
Rank	Athlete	Nation	Time	Notes
1	Arnold Jackson	Great Britain	4:10.8	Q
2	John Paul Jones	United States	4:12.4	Q
3	John Victor	South Africa	4:12.7	
4	Lewis Anderson	United States	Unknown	
5	Oscar Larsen	Norway	Unknown	
6	Arnolds Indriksons	Russia	Unknown	
7	Alfrēds Ruks	Russia	Unknown	

==== Semifinal 5 ====
Rank	Athlete	Nation	Time	Notes
1	John Zander	Sweden	4:05.5	Q
2	Evert Björn	Sweden	4:07.2	Q
3	Herbert Putnam	United States	4:07.6	
4	Richard Yorke	Great Britain	Unknown	
5	Georg Mickler	Germany	Unknown	
6	Aleksandr Elizarov	Russia	Unknown	
7	Nikolay Kharkov	Russia	Unknown	
—	Charles Ruffell	Great Britain	DNF	

==== Semifinal 6 ====
Rank	Athlete	Nation	Time	Notes
1	Erwin von Sigel	Germany	4:09.3	Q
2	Frederick Hedlund	United States	4:10.8	Q
3	William Moore	Great Britain	4:11.2	
4	Nils Frykberg	Sweden	4:11.2	
5–6	Frederick Hulford	Great Britain	Unknown	
5–6	Andrejs Krūkliņš	Russia	Unknown	
—	Guido Calvi	Italy	DNF	

==== Semifinal 7 ====
Rank	Athlete	Nation	Time	Notes
1	Ernst Wide	Sweden	4:06.0	Q
2	Walter McClure	United States	4:07.3	Q
3	Joe Cottrill	Great Britain	Unknown	
4	Efraim Harju	Finland	Unknown	
5	Yevgeny Petrov	Russia	Unknown	
—	Vahram Papazian	Turkey	DNF	

=== Final ===
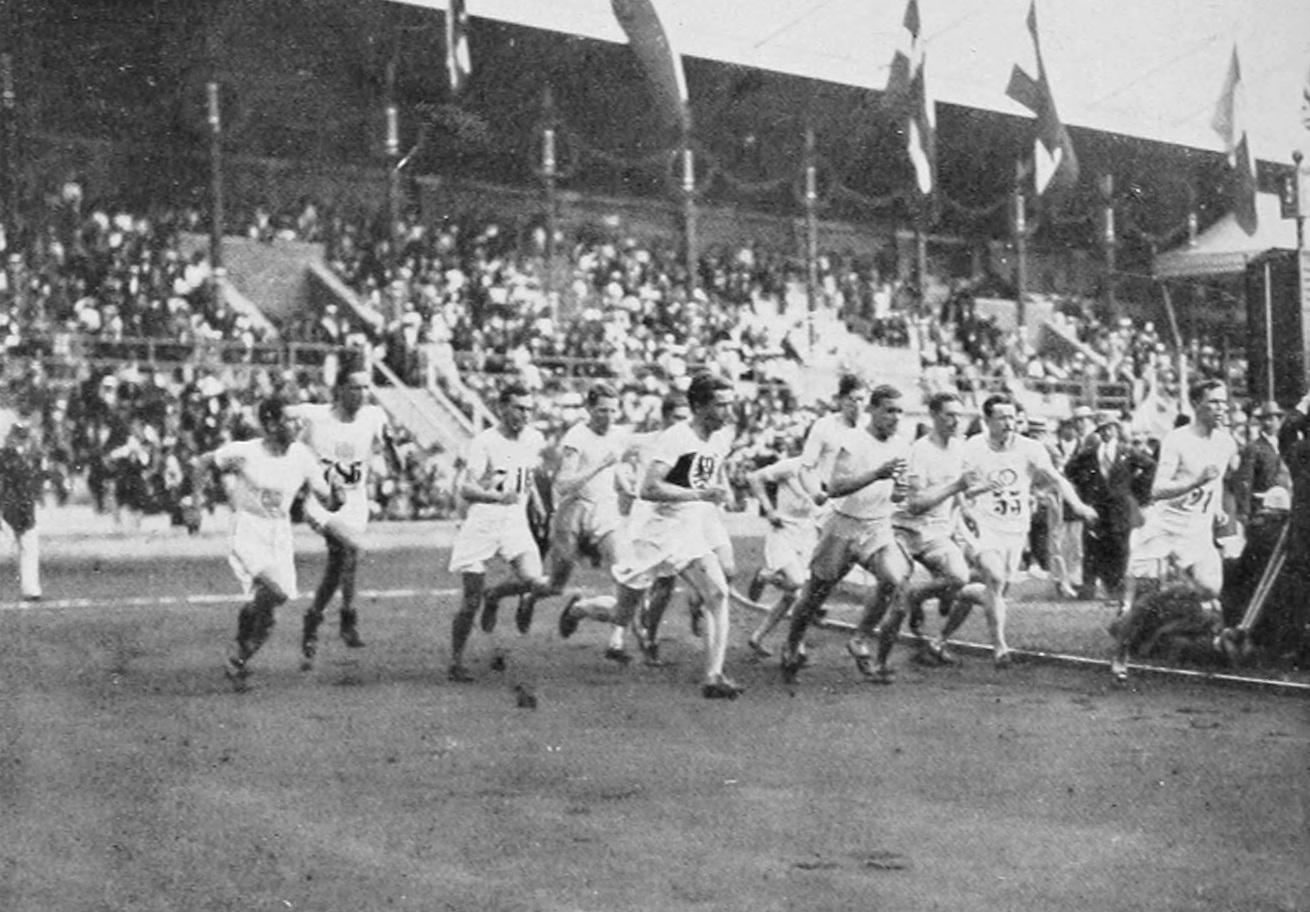
The start of the final.

The final was held on Wednesday, July 10, 1912.

Rank	Athlete	Nation	Time	Notes
1st place, gold medalist(s)	Arnold Jackson	Great Britain	3:56.8	OR
2nd place, silver medalist(s)	Abel Kiviat	United States	3:56.9	
3rd place, bronze medalist(s)	Norman Taber	United States	3:56.9	
4	John Paul Jones	United States	3:57.2	
5	Ernst Wide	Sweden	3:57.6	
6	Philip Baker	Great Britain	4:01.0	
7	John Zander	Sweden	4:02.0	
8	Walter McClure	United States	Unknown	
9–14	Henri Arnaud	France	Unknown	
9–14	Evert Björn	Sweden	Unknown	
9–14	Oscar Hedlund	United States	Unknown	
9–14	Louis Madeira	United States	Unknown	
9–14	Mel Sheppard	United States	Unknown	
9–14	Erwin von Sigel	Germany	Unknown	

== Sources ==
- Bergvall, Erik, ed. (1913). The Official Report of the Olympic Games of Stockholm 1912. Translated by Adams-Ray, Edward. Stockholm: Wahlström & Widstrand.
- Wudarski, Pawel (1999). "Wyniki Igrzysk Olimpijskich" (in Polish).
