= Ira Davenport =

Ira Davenport is the name of:

- Ira Davenport (politician) (1841–1904), New York politician
- Ira Davenport (athlete) (1887–1941), American athlete and Olympic (1912) bronze medalist
- Ira Davenport, spiritualist, one of the Davenport Brothers
