= Joseph Higgins =

Joseph or Joe Higgins may refer to:

- Joseph Higgins (bishop), Irish-born Roman Catholic bishop in Australia
- Joseph J. Higgins, member of the New Jersey General Assembly
- Joe Higgins (politician), Irish politician
- Joe Higgins (Gaelic footballer)
- Joe Higgins (actor) (1925–1998), American actor
- Joseph Higgins (runner) (born 1894), American middle-distance runner, 3rd in the 880 yards at the 1915 USA Outdoor Track and Field Championships
