= Gerri Major =

American writer (1894–1984)

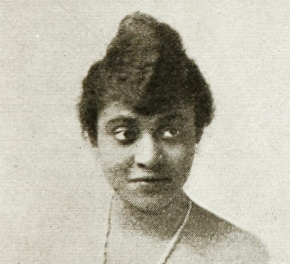
- Geraldyn Hodges (Gerri Major) from an article entitled "Our Future Leaders" in The Crisis (v. 10, n. 3, July 1915)
- Born: Geraldyn Hodges; July 29, 1894; Chicago, United States
- Died: August 17, 1984 (aged 90)

Gerri Major (July 29, 1894 – August 17, 1984), who became known as Geraldyn Hodges Dismond for a time, was an American journalist, editor, newscaster, publicist, public health official, author and community leader. During World War I, she was a major in the American Red Cross. Thereafter, she became a society columnist and editor for African American newspapers in her home city of New York as well as in Pittsburgh, Chicago, and Baltimore. In 1936, a newspaper reporter said her talent for writing vivid prose, editing, and maintaining a wide circle of influential friends brought her fame and gave her "a unique position similar to that of an arbiter over the local social set." Ebony magazine attested that by the end of the 1930s she had become "one of the best known black women in America." and at the time of her death in 1984, she held joint positions as associate editor of Jet and senior staff editor of Ebony.

During all of her adult life, she was an active participant in civic organizations that worked to improve the health, education and general well-being of New York's African American community, and for 10 years (from 1936 to 1946) was a publicity specialist for the Central Harlem Health District.

== Parents and immediate family ==
Major was born on July 29, 1894, in her parents' home on Wentworth Avenue at the western border of the Douglas section of Chicago's Bronzeville neighborhood. Her father was Herbert Hodges and her mother was Mae Powell Hodges. Major reported that her mother's grandfather had migrated from North Carolina to Indiana seeking freedom. Soon after her mother died while giving birth to her, she was adopted by her mother's sister, Maud Lawrence, and her husband David. The Lawrence family had sufficient wealth to give Major an extravagant debutante ball. While yet unmarried, Major kept Hodges as her family name.

On December 15, 1917, Major married H. Binga Dismond in a military ceremony at Camp Logan in Houston. Before becoming a physician, Binga Dismond was a world record holder in the 440 yards and finished 3rd at the 1915 USA Outdoor Track and Field Championships. They were divorced in 1933 but remained cordial.

In 1942 she married musician Gilbert Holland, a baritone whose voice was heard frequently on radio programs of the 1930s. (Note: Born in Canada, Holland was listed as a "colored performer" by an African American newspaper and Major later said he was "mostly Cherokee.") Her last marriage was to a prominent mortician from Atlantic City, New Jersey, John Richard Major. The ceremony took place in Buenos Aires during a trip they took to South America, probably in 1946. This was her third marriage and his fourth. She was widowed by 1953 and did not remarry during the remaining three decades of her life.

Other names

Major's first name, Geraldyn, was sometimes (wrongly) given as Geraldyne or Geraldine. Her nickname, Gerri, was sometimes given as Jerry or Gerry. While married to H. Binga Dismond she was known as Geraldyn Dismond, Mrs. H. Binga Dismond, or (rarely) Geraldyn Hodges Dismond. During her brief marriage to Gilbert Holland she was known as Geraldyn Holland, Geraldyn Hodges Holland, or Geraldyn Dismond Holland. After marrying John Richard Major, she was called Geraldyn Major, Geraldyn Hodges Major, and Geraldyn Dismond Major. During the last three decades of her life her name was usually rendered as Gerri Major. During her marriage to H. Binga Dismond, she sometimes called herself and was sometimes called "La Dismond." In writing the "Social Whirl" column for the Afro-American she called herself simply Gerry.

== Early life and education ==
Major was born in Chicago on July 29, 1894. Her birth name was Geraldyn Hodges. When her mother died giving birth to her, Major's father arranged for her adoption by an aunt and uncle who lived nearby. In a biographic sketch published in 1927, Major's first husband explained that her father was "overcome by the sudden loss of his wife ... [and] never forgave the innocent cause of his bereavement." Following elementary school, she attended Wendell Phillips High School and subsequently was awarded a work-study scholarship at the University of Chicago, from which she graduated with a Bachelor in Philosophy degree in 1915. On October 8, 1913, while being a university student, she chartered the Beta Chapter of Alpha Kappa Alpha sorority, along with 4 other college women.

In the summer months after her graduation from college, Major studied at Hampton Institute and during the next school year she taught dramatic art and physical culture at Lincoln Institute, an African American college in Jefferson City, Missouri. Not liking the situation there, she returned to Chicago to enter a two-year program at Chicago Normal School so that she could qualify to teach elementary school in that city. In the fall of 1917, Major served as a teacher-in-training or "cadet" in the Chicago public school system. In December of that year, she interrupted her progress toward becoming a Chicago school teacher in order to marry H. Binga Dismond, whom she had met at the University of Chicago. The ceremony took place at Camp Logan in Houston, Texas, where Dismond was training for service in the Army. During American participation in World War I, while Dismond served in France, Major became a Red Cross nurse in Chicago, leaving that organization in 1918 with the rank of major. (Note: Red Cross nurses who served during World War I were granted "relative" or courtesy ranks. They were not commissioned officers, but were expected to be accorded respect according to rank. The superintendent of a nursing facility was qualified to be given the rank of Major.)

In 1919, Major taught at the Stephen A. Douglas Elementary School in Chicago, the same school she had attended as a child. In his biographic sketch of 1927, her husband noted that it was a distinctive honor to be appointed school clerk as well as teacher since "95 per cent of the teachers were non-Aframerican." She left the teaching profession in 1923 when she and her husband moved to Manhattan. She later said she found herself with nothing to do in New York and was "positively miserable" until 1925 when she participated in a fundraising effort for the National Association for the Advancement of Colored People. Early in March of that year, she composed and distributed a public announcement for the annual NAACP dance in Harlem's Manhattan Casino. The release, which appeared in the New York Age on March 7, led to the job offer that would prove to be the starting point for her career in journalism.

== Later life ==
During the course of a long career, Major was a journalist, editor, newscaster, publicist, public health official, author, and community leader.

=== Journalist ===
The press release she distributed to publicize the NAACP dance caught the eye of Floyd J. Calvin, the New York editor for an influential African-American newspaper, the Pittsburgh Courier, who subsequently named Major as the paper's New York social editor. The paper's announcement of her appointment included a photograph showing her elegantly dressed and posed. The announcement called Major a leader in Harlem society and a "prime favorite in Gotham's best circles." Major's first piece for the Courier, which appeared over the byline, Mrs. H. Binga Dismond, reported on plans for the Urban League's costume ball to be held in November 1925. From 1925 to 1927, Major wrote a weekly column called "New York Society" in which she reported the doings of prominent members of the African American community. In 1927, Major began a new column called "Through the Lorgnette of Geraldyn Dismond" which, instead of New York society news, contained essays and reviews on theater, books and cultural topics. (Note: During the period she was married to H. Binga Dismond and afterward until her short-lived marriage to Gilbert Holland in 1942, Major was known as Mrs. H. Binga Dismond, Geraldyn Hodges Dismond, or simply Geraldyn Dismond. In announcing the new column the editor of the Pittsburgh Courier said Major had achieved national prominence as a keen observer of the social scene and would consequently be writing weekly essays "giving original observations and comments on subjects that interest her.") Soon afterward she began writing a weekly column of New York social news called "In New York Town" for the Chicago Bee, and the following year (1928), she started yet another society column, this one called "New York Social Whirl" appearing in the Baltimore Afro-American. She continued to write for the Chicago Bee and the Afro-American through the end of the 1930s. In 1933, she worked as writer and editor for the short-lived Harlem Daily Citizen, and between 1927 and 1931, in addition to her other news work, she was a writer and editor for the Inter-State Tattler for which she wrote columns called "Social Snapshots of Geraldyn Dismond" and "Between Puffs by Lady Nicotine." She subsequently served a four-year stint as columnist for the New York Age following which, from 1939 to 1952 she was a columnist and editor for the New York Amsterdam News. (Note: The New York Age was a widely-read and long-lived daily newspaper published in New York which was known for its efforts to foster creativity and racial pride among its African-America readers.) (Note: Published weekly in Harlem, the Amsterdam News was considered in 1928 to be "the best local Negro newspaper in the country", unique in the high quality of its content.) In 1953, she began a long career as writer and editor for two sister magazines: the monthly, Ebony, and the weekly, Jet. (Note: Ebony is a glossy, photo-rich, Chicago-based monthly magazine that began publication in November 1945. Emulating Life and Look magazines, it aimed to celebrate achievements by African Americans throughout the country.) (Note: Jet was a pocket-sized easy-to-read weekly newsmagazine. Founded in 1951, it quickly achieved sales of over 300,000 copies a week.)

=== Harlem Socialite and Black Society Editor ===
Mrs. H. Binga Dismond was a founding member of the Chicago Club of New York City (Harlem) along with Mme. Seay Dixon aka Mrs. Maude Dixon Myers and her sister Mrs. Rose Knox Ellis. Members included: Mrs. Beatrice lee Cooper, Gerri Major as president, Mrs. Etna Thompson Frye, Mrs. Bert A. Williams (Lottie), Miss Rena Branham, Mrs. Eduardo Castro, Mrs. Rose Knox Ellis, Miss Rena M. Lewis, Mrs. Marie Peek Johnson, Mrs. Maude S. Myers, Mrs. Ada Patterson, Mrs. Carrie Thomas Payne, Miss Lottie Tyler and Mrs. Irene Hudlin Jordan. Invitations to join the group were extended to the following socialites: Mrs. Dorothy Shoecraft Pruitt, Mrs. Magnolia Greene and Gussie Jones Patterson. Major's first editorial job was New York social editor of the Pittsburgh Courier.

While still contributing extensive new content, she performed more extensive editorial work from 1928 to 1932 for the Inter-State Tattler. In 1930 a reporter said the Tattler's name was "synonymous with Geraldyn Dismond." (Note: The Inter-State Tattler (also called the Interstate Tattler) was a cross between a newspaper and a magazine. Published weekly in Harlem it covered cultural affairs, particularly the theater, and billed itself as "America's Great Pictorial Weekly." Theophilus Lewis was editor with Major as managing or associate editor and star columnist. The paper began publication in February 1925 and no issues have been found after August 1932.) In 1933 and 1934 Major edited the Daily Citizen during its brief life. (Note: The Daily Citizen, also called the Harlem Heights Daily Citizen, was a daily newspaper that began publication in October 1933 and apparently concluded only three months later in January 1934.) Subsequently, she was both social reporter and society editor of the New York Age, and during the 1940s was women's page editor for the New York Amsterdam News. In 1953 she began a twenty-five-year career at Ebony as writer and society editor. She later became associate editor, and, in 1967, senior staff editor, the position she held at her death in 1984. In 1953 she also joined Jet as writer and society editor, later becoming associate editor, a position she retained until her death. She worked in the New York offices that were jointly maintained by both magazines. (Note: Ebony and Jet were both published by the Johnson Publishing Company.) The year that she began with Ebony and Jet she was sent to England to cover the coronation of Queen Elizabeth II.

=== Radio announcer and promoter ===
Between 1928 and 1930 Major wrote and presented a review of current events during a New York radio program that aired each week on Sunday afternoon. This made her, as one source put it, "the first Negro woman commercial radio announcer." The program was the "Negro Achievement Hour", a variety show featuring talks and music that was carried on two local stations, WABC and WEVD. (Note: Begun in January 1928, "The Negro Achievement Hour" was sponsored by local organizations each of which provided its own content. Major was an announcer for the news review segment and also occasionally appeared in the main content of the shows.) (Note: Radio station WABC belonged to the Atlantic Broadcasting Company and should not be confused with the later American Broadcasting Company. In 1929 the newly formed Columbia Broadcasting System acquired WABC and moved its operations from Brooklyn to Steinway Hall on West 57th Street in Manhattan.) (Note: Radio station WEVD was owned and operated by the Socialist Party of America and its call letters came from the initials of the party's former leader, Eugene V. Debs. It operated from a location in Queens, New York.) In addition to newscasting, Major was a program director for the show. The program ceased after its 85th week in August 1929. In 1930 Major helped to establish a broadcasting studio in Harlem, became the organization's secretary, and announced many of its programs on air. (Note: Harlem Broadcasting was founded by Joseph J. Boris, who had also created the "Negro Achievement Hour" and who had edited and published a reference book, Who's Who Among American Negroes (New York, Who's Who in Colored America Corp., 1927). Run by the Harlem Broadcasting Corporation, it was a studio, artist bureau, and lessor of time on radio stations including WGBS, WEVD, WRNY, WKBO (of Jersey City, N.J.), and WWRL. Major appeared every day except Tuesday and often wrote her own continuity.)

=== Publicist ===
In 1928 Major became one of the first, if not the very first, African American women to take on the role of publicist. Located in Harlem on 135th Street the Geraldyn Dismond Bureau of Specialized Publicity developed an extensive mailing list and established its credentials by landing a contract to publicize an all-African-American stage production called "Africana" starring Ethel Waters.

=== Health educator ===
In 1933 Major became executive director of a health center on Lenox Avenue in Harlem that was operated by the United Health Association. (Note: The United Health Association was formed in 1932 as a group practice designed to foster health through education and periodic examinations. It followed a model that had been set in 1925 by Dr. Michael Edmund Dubissette. It offered health services for a nominal weekly fee.) The following year she was chosen by the Newspaper Guild to work on a welfare publicity project in the Central Harlem Health District. (Note: The project was sponsored by the Welfare Council of New York City. Headed by William Hodson, the Welfare Council was established in 1925 as an umbrella organization to coordinate the work of New York's social assistance agencies.) In 1936 she passed civil service examinations and oral interviews to become a publicity assistant in the New York Bureau of Health Education and Information, a job she continued to perform until 1946. A news report on Major's appointment said her performance on written and oral civil service examinations and her prior experience resulted in her selection and noted that she was the first African American to be hired into the position. It said, "Her extraordinarily clever style of writing plus the advantage of a wide circle of friends in the elite circles wherever she went, placed her at the top of the society writers in short order. As Society Editor of the Interstate Tattler, prior to its discontinuing several years ago, she held a unique position similar to that of an arbiter over the local social set and it was during that time that her fame, both as a writer and hostess, is said to have reached its peak."

=== Author ===
In 1929 Major wrote an article for Close Up containing analysis and criticism of motion pictures. Calling itself an "international magazine devoted to film art", the journal was an avant garde publication that investigated the cultural aspects of cinema beyond the medium's obvious role in entertaining its audiences. Her article was "The Negro Actor and the American Movies." (Note: Close Up magazine had a European orientation. Published in Switzerland, it was written in English and maintained an editorial office in London. Edited by Kenneth Macpherson and his wife, Bryher, the journal contained articles by filmmakers, such as Sergei Eisenstein, and female modernist writers, such as H.D. and Gertrude Stein.) In 1976 Major co-authored a book, Black Society, giving the histories of prominent African American families from colonial times to the twentieth century. (Note: Major's co-author was Doris E. Saunders then head of the Johnson Publishing Company's book division whose contribution to the work was the research that underlay it.)

=== Community leader ===
In October 1925, the biographic sketch that accompanied Major's appointed New York social editor for the Pittsburgh Courier referred to her not just as "a leader in Harlem society" but also as "a willing worker for charity and social uplift agencies, [who] has contributed much to the betterment of the community by her many and varied community interests." A month later, as a mark of her social standing, she was runner up in nationwide balloting for "Queen of the Classic" on the occasion of the annual football game between Lincoln and Howard Universities. A year later, Major figured prominently within a group of "representative New York society leaders" in text accompanying a news photo headed "New York Social Leaders Plan Brilliant Season". The photo's caption listed some of her many positions in civic organizations. (Note: The news account said Major was president of the Chicago Club of New York, treasurer of the Women's Auxiliary to the Urban League, chairman of the entertainment committee of the Woman's Auxiliary to the N.A.A.C.P., chairman of publicity for the Woman's Auxiliary to the Edgecombe Sanitarium, chairman of the Bethune–Cookman League of New York, club reporter for the Semper Fidelis Club, member of the A.K.A Sorority, and secretary of the Women's Auxiliary to the Y.M.C.A. Edgecombe Sanitarium was a private hospital in Harlem. The group in which Major participated helped raise funds to permit indigent Harlemites to afford its use. Private hospitals were established mainly because African Americans were given inadequate care at Harlem Hospital and other public hospitals. The Bethune–Cookman League helped support the Bethune–Cookman College Daytona Beach, Florida. The Semper Fidelis Club held an annual fund-raising dance to provide scholarships for needy students. A list of memberships given to another reporter four years later included some of the same organizations and in addition the Elks, two theater companies, the American Interracial Peace Committee, the Citizen's Welfare Council, the North Harlem Community Council, the Utopia Neighborhood Club, the Hope Day Nursery, the Communist Party, and St. Martin's Episcopalian Chapel.) In 1930 she was included among "the Four Hundred" in an article that drew a sharp contrast between the "Harlem of the cabarets" frequented by thrill-seeking white New Yorkers and the "ebony society" to which Major belonged, where fashionable men and women in "tail coats and formal evening gowns" attended "exclusive functions for the brown upper crust" to which "a few white guests" might be invited." (Note: The readers of the article would have recognized "The Four Hundred" as an allusion to the white members of fashionable New York society who flourished at the end of the nineteenth century. In 1888, Ward McAllister, who was seen, with Caroline Schermerhorn Astor, as arbiter of that society, told a reporter, "Why, there are only about 400 people in fashionable New-York society. If you go outside that number you strike people who are either not at ease in a ball-room or else make other people ill at ease." Such people, he said, "have not the poise, the aptitude for polite conversation, the polished and deferential manner, the infinite capacity of good humor and ability to entertain or be entertained that society demands.") In 1939 she served as chair of the program committee for participation of African Americans in the American Common section of the 1939 New York World's Fair. (Note: The American Common was a performance area occupying space left when the Soviet Union withdrew from the World's Fair in 1940. It was used to stage pageants celebrating American democracy and diversity. The Common was devoted to a "Negro Week" during July 1940. A news account said the program assembled under Major's leadership included "pageants, dramatic skits, dances and symphonic and popular musical numbers.") In 1951 Major was guest of honor and "woman of the year" at a charity ball held by a New York women's club. (Note: The occasion was a fancy headdress dance, the Second Annual Bal de Tete, held by an exclusive club that called itself "The Women." The tag "woman of the year" was not used in this first tribute but was retrospectively applied to Major during subsequent award ceremonies where the honoree was given that title. The plaque presented to her cited "her years of distinguished work in the field of journalism and for her many other notable contributions to the community.") In 1952 she was cited for "humane deeds performed in behalf of her community" by a New York impresario, Freddie Fulton. (Note: Freddie Fulton was a successful talent agent who provided performing artists for shows, social functions, and the like. He also ran a studio to help performers develop their skills.) Her obituary in Ebony listed some of the civic organizations to which Major belonged and mentioned thirty honors and citations that she had received.

Major traveled overseas during the 1940s and 1950s, including trips to Egypt, Brazil, and Argentina. Her wedding to John Majors, her third and final marriage, took place in Buenos Aires.

Political affiliations

In 1928 and 1930 she was reported to be a member of the Communist Party. Asked about political affiliations in 1928 she said she would not join the National Colored Women's Democratic League and had no ties to the Democratic Party. She said she had adopted the principles of Communism because she believed that both the Republican and Democratic Parties "uphold the practices of Jim-Crowism, disenfranchisement, and race discrimination by which Negroes are degraded and oppressed." (Note: The Colored Women's Democratic League was established in 1923 to foster support of the Democratic Party among African Americans. Its founder and president, Bessye J. Bearden was, like Major, a prominent Harlem resident, journalist, and civic leader.) By 1984, however, she had become an active member of the Democratic Party.

== Legacy ==
One of her dresses, designed by Mr. Dino, is held in the National Museum of African American History & Culture.

Major is a prominent figure in the documentary, Once Upon a Time in Harlem, by William and David Greaves, which won the 2026 Library of Congress Lavine/Ken Burns Prize for Film. The film is an account of an August 1972 party held at Duke Ellington's house reuniting various Harlem Renaissance figures.
