= Henri Arnaud =

Henri Arnaud is the name of:

- Henri Arnaud (pastor) (1641–1721), pastor of the Vaudois
- Henri Arnaud (athlete) (1891–1956), French middle-distance runner

== See also ==
- Henri Arnauld (1597–1692), French Catholic bishop
