= Mgrdich Mgrian =

Turkish athlete

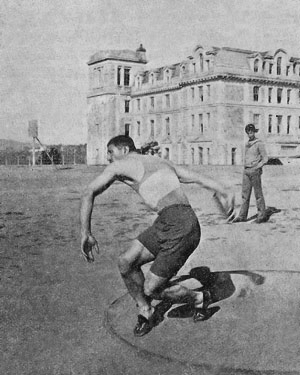
- Mgrdich Mgrian discus throwing at Robert College.

Personal information
- Native name: Մկրտիչ Մկրեան
- Nationality: Ottoman
- Born: 12 September 1882 Üsküdar, Ottoman Empire
- Died: 1915 (aged 32–33)

Sport
- Sport: shot put, discus throw, two handed shot put, pentathlon, decathlon.
- Event(s): Shot put, discus, athletics pentathlon, decathlon
- Updated on 4 February 2013

Mgrdich Mgrian (Armenian: Մկրտիչ Մկրեան, romanized: Mkrtich’ Mkrean, also spelled Mıgır, Mığır, Migir in Turkish; 12 September 1882 – 1915) was one of two athletes who represented the Ottoman Empire in the Olympic Games which was held in Stockholm in 1912.

Mgrian participated in shot put, discus throw, two handed shot put, pentathlon, and decathlon competitions. Mgrdich Mgrian along with ethnic Armenian Vahram Papazyan were the only two athletes representing Turkey in the country's first official participation of the Olympics.

== Life ==
Mgrdich Mgrian attended the prestigious Robert College in Constantinople. One of his classmates was Vahram Papazyan, another ethnic Armenian Olympian who would participate with him at the 1912 Olympics.

When Ottoman Empire was admitted to the International Olympic Committee (IOC) in 1911, the president of the Ottoman Empire's Olympic committee Selim Sırrı Tarcan placed advertisements in the local Ikdam and Sabah newspapers in order to recruit athletes for the 1912 Olympic Games in Stockholm. Mgrian responded to the advertisement and expressed his desires to participate in the games. Unlike his counterpart Vahram Papazyan, who did not have the required finances to pay for the trip, Mgrian came from a wealthy family who managed to cover all the necessary expenses needed for the trip to the Stockholm Olympics. Having participated in five different sporting events, Mgrian holds the record of most sporting events participated by a Turkish athlete in Olympic history.

== Olympics ==
During the Olympics, Mgrian managed to play all five sports. While competing against Jim Thorpe during the Decathlon, however, Mgrian suffered a wrist injury and was forced to discontinue.

=== Results ===
Events	Heat		Semifinal		Final	
Events	Result	Rank	Result	Rank	Result	Rank
Shot put	N/A		10.63	19	did not advance	
Discus throw	N/A		32.98	34	did not advance	
2 hand shot put	N/A		19.78	7	did not advance	
Pentathlon	N/A				Elim-3 67	23
Decathlon	N/A				1527.750	29

== See also ==
- Turkey at the Olympics
- National Olympic Committee of Turkey
