= David Caldwell (runner) =

American middle-distance runner (1891–1953)

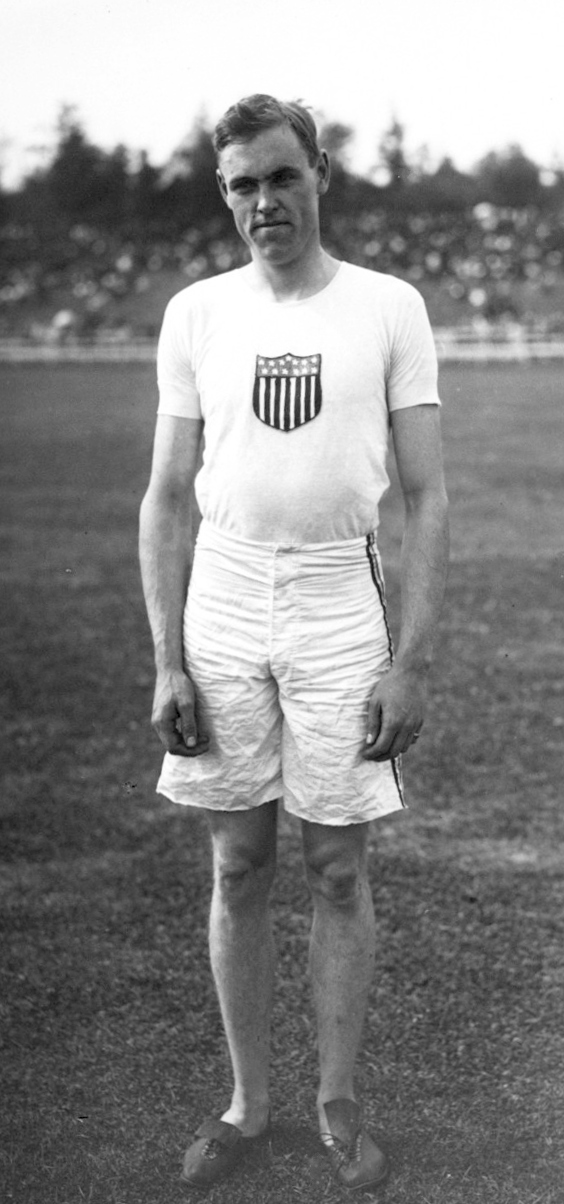
- David Caldwell in 1912

Personal information
- National team: United States
- Born: April 27, 1891 Byfield, Massachusetts, U.S.
- Died: January 6, 1953 (aged 61) Byfield, Massachusetts, U.S.
- Education: University of Massachusetts; Cornell University
- Height: 1.78 m (5 ft 10 in)
- Weight: 70 kg (150 lb)

Sport
- Sport: Athletics
- Events: 440 yd, 800 m, 880 yd, 1,000 yd
- College team: University of Massachusetts Minutemen; Cornell Big Red
- Club: Boston Athletic Association

Achievements and titles
- Personal bests: 440 yd – 49.4 (1914); 800 m – 1:52.8 (1912) (estimated)

David Story Caldwell (April 27, 1891 – January 6, 1953) was an American middle distance runner. He competed in the 800 m at the 1912 Summer Olympics and finished in fourth place.

== Running Career ==
=== University of Massachusetts ===
==== 1909-1911 ====
Caldwell started at The University of Massachusetts, then called Massachusetts Agricultural College, in the fall of 1909. He studied agriculture and competed for the university track team where he would run one mile, two mile, and three mile races. He would find immediate success, having an undefeated record his freshman season and defeating athletes such as Norman Taber in his sophomore year. He also participated in a number of handicapped races where he would start a certain distance behind the field. His nickname was "Bone".

Caldwell was also a member of the university relay team in his second year, which was treated as its own season. The relay races were often run over arbitrary distances depending on the lengths of the tracks, which were commonly drawn on the floors of gymnasiums and armory halls.

Caldwell would lead the class of 1913 to wins in the annual interclass meets at UMass as well.

==== 1911-1912 ====
In the fall of 1911, Caldwell was elected as the secretary and treasurer of the class of 1913, and also won the interclass cross country race, a six and a half mile race he had placed second in the previous year. This fall was also the first record of Caldwell competing with the university cross country team, as he finished second in a meet with Tufts University.

Again Caldwell was a member of the university relay team. This team set a school record in the mile relay at the Columbia meet in New York.

At the New England Intercollegiate meet, Caldwell was spotted a 5 yard handicap in a race against graduated Amherst College sprinter and 1911 IC4A champion Donnell Young, which he won by a slim margin. Young had been a student at UMass before transferring across town to Amherst. As UMass was not a member of the New England Intercollegiate Collegiate Amateur Athletic Association yet, this was an unscored event. The final meet of the university season was against University of Vermont where Caldwell won the 220 yards in his first race at the distance. Star Vermont athlete Albert Gutterson was injured and only competed in throwing events instead of his usual sprints and jumps, preventing a race between him and Caldwell. At the conclusion of the season, Caldwell was elected as the captain for the 1913 season.

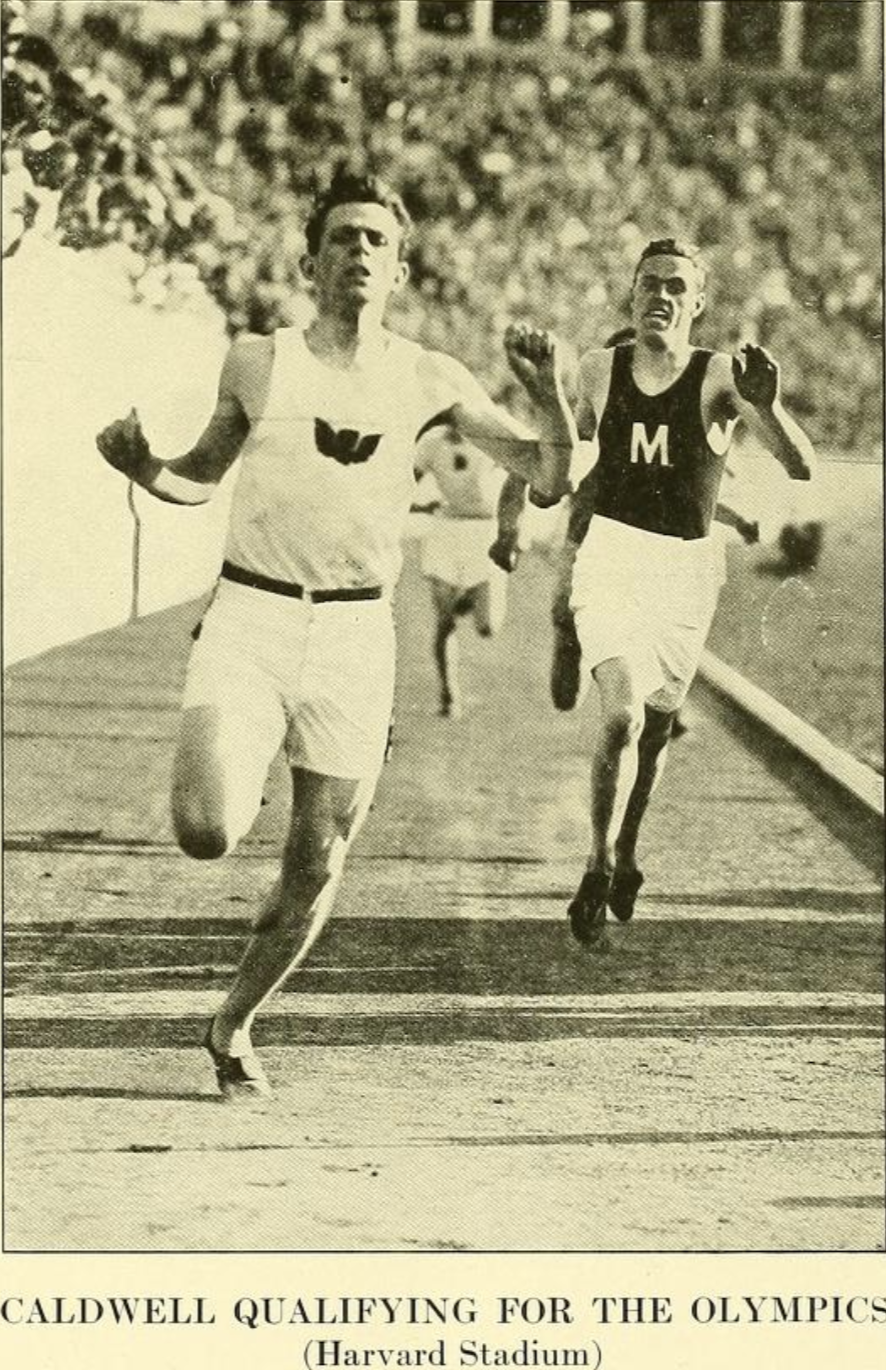
Caldwell (wearing the Massachusetts "M") finishes second behind Mel Sheppard to qualify for the 1912 Olympic Games

=== Trials and Olympics ===
Caldwell's performances in the 1912 season earned him a bid to the Eastern Olympic Trials, held at Harvard Stadium where he would run the 800 meters. He was not considered a contender to make the team, which required at least a top three finish. Prior to the meet, Caldwell trained with Richard F. Nelligan, a successful trainer, coach, and physical education teacher at Amherst College. The preliminary races were split into two heats, with Caldwell running in heat two against world record holder Mel Sheppard, who had run 1:52.8. Caldwell ran a huge personal best of 1:53.7, finishing second behind Sheppard and making the final. In the final, Caldwell ran behind Ted Meredith and Thomas Halpin, before moving into first place on the back straightaway. In the last 20 yards, Sheppard passed Caldwell and won the race, while Caldwell finished close behind in second place and punched his ticket to the 1912 Olympic Games in Stockholm, Sweden. Other athletes making this team included Sheppard and Meredith in the 800 m, Halpin in the 400 m, and a few runners that Caldwell had crossed paths with earlier in his career including Norman Taber in the mile, Donnell Young in the 400 m, and Albert Gutterson in the long jump. Athletes at the eastern meet were favored over those of the western and central meets.

The Olympic track events began on July 6th and ran through July 15th. The 800 m trials, semifinals, and finals were held in the first three days of competition. Caldwell was in the first of nine heats on July 6th which he won in 1:58.6, moving him into the semifinal. On July 7th, Caldwell finished third in the second semifinal in 1:55.9, good enough to advance to the final. The final held on the following day was the fastest 800 m race in world history at the time. The previous world record of 1:52.8 was broken by the top three finishers and tied by Caldwell, who finished fourth and missed a medal by less than a second. It was originally listed that Caldwell had finished 5th behind Hanns Braun or Mel Brock, with different reports stating each. Eventually the available photographs were checked by reliable sources and Caldwell was awarded fourth. Caldwell’s 1:52.8 is listed as an estimated time. Ted Meredith set the world record with a time of 1:51.9.

After the games he participated in meets throughout Europe before returning home.

=== Cornell ===
==== 1912-1914 ====
After his Olympic success, Caldwell transferred to Cornell University. Cornell was a national powerhouse at the time, winning IC4A titles in 1905, 1906, 1908, and 1911. Prior to the creation of the NCAA championships, the IC4A meet was the most important collegiate meet of the season. In his first year at Cornell he was ineligible to compete for the varsity track team, instead running with the Boston Athletic Association and competing in interclass meets at Cornell, where he represented the college of agriculture. At the interclass meet he entered into events from the long jump to the 440 yards. Caldwell would place second at the 1912 USA Outdoor Track and Field Championships.

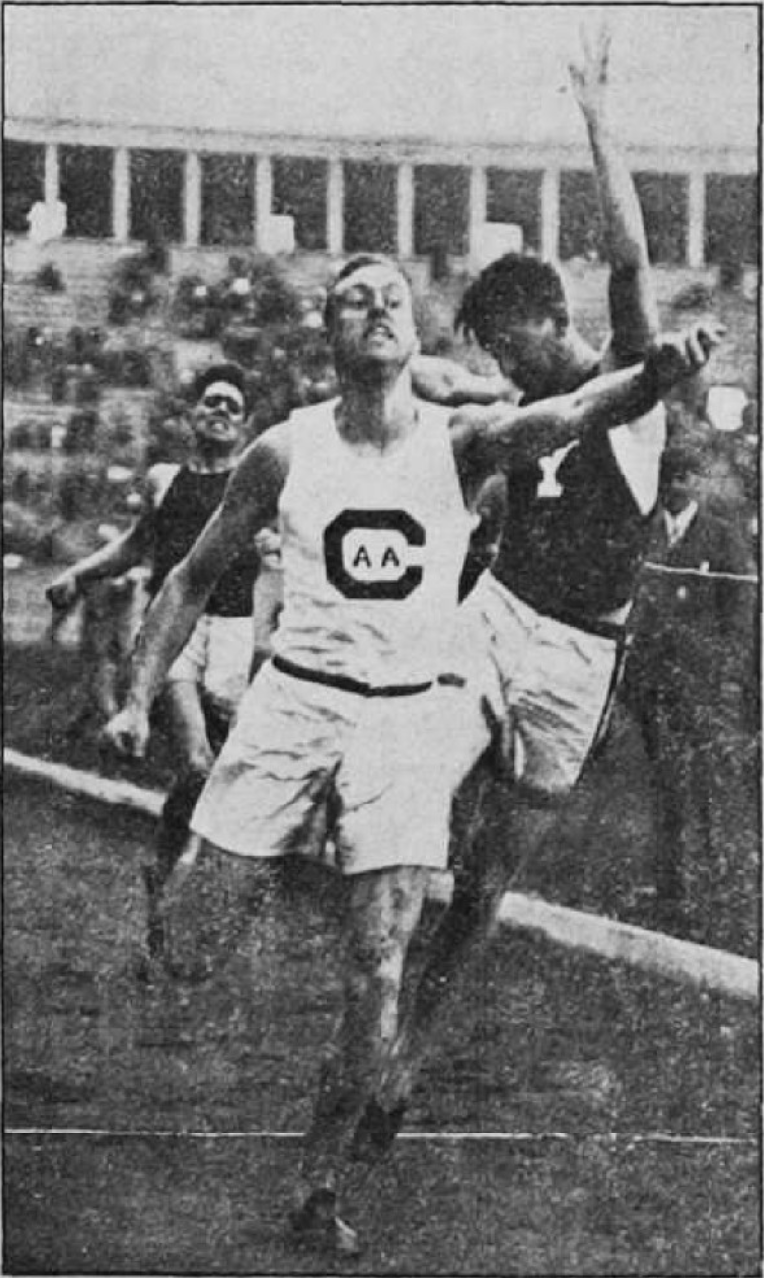
Caldwell wins the 1914 IC4A 880yd

After a bumpy start to his 1914 season in which he fell down in a relay race against Harvard at Mechanics Hall, Caldwell had success throughout the rest of the season. He would lead Cornell to wins over Yale, Georgetown, and Michigan, run a 440 yard personal best of 49.4, and qualify for the IC4A championships.

Prior to the IC4A championship meet, Caldwell was predicted by former Olympic teammate Donald Lippincott to place second in the 440 yards and fourth in the 220 yards. However Cornell coach John Moakley entered Caldwell into the 880 yards where he would again race Ted Meredith of Penn, who still held the 800 m world record. In the preliminary heat, Caldwell finished second to Meredith, but moved on to the final. In the final Caldwell would not only defeat Meredith, but would set a Cornell, IC4A meet, and tie the collegiate record with a time of 1:53.4. Cornell would go on to win the meet, snapping a three year streak of University of Pennsylvania victories. The The Cornell Daily Sun called the victory “one of the most remarkable ever achieved by a Cornell athletic team and culminated the most successful track season in the University history”. In the fall of 1914, Caldwell was named an All American by the New York Sun.

==== Post collegiate career ====
Caldwell would continue competing after his graduation from Cornell where he would return to the B.A.A. Notably, He would win the 1915 USA Indoor Track and Field Championships 1000 yard title at the 22nd Regiment Armory in New York City and was the runner up at the 1915 USA Outdoor Track and Field Championships in the 880 yards in San Francisco. The 1916 Olympics were canceled because of World War I, preventing Caldwell another shot at Olympic glory.

He would continue competing in high level meets until 1919, when he retired from the sport after a 600 yd race in New York in which he finished fourth.

== Later Life ==
Caldwell became a farmer in northeastern Massachusetts. He also served as the postmaster in his native South Byfield and a volunteer athletics coach at his alma mater Governor Dummer Academy.
