= Ira Davenport (athlete) =

American athlete and coach (1887–1941)

- Davenport in Illinois Athletic Club Jersey

Biographical details
- Born: October 13, 1887; Winfield, Kansas, U.S.
- Died: July 17, 1941 (aged 53); Dubuque, Iowa, U.S.
- Height: 178 cm (5 ft 10 in)
- Weight: 72 kg (159 lb)
- Education: University of Chicago (1912)

Playing career

Football, Quarterback
- 1909–1911: University of Chicago; Alonzo Stagg, Coach

Track (Sprint, Middle Distance)
- 1905-1908: University Prep School; Tonakawa, Oklahoma
- 1909-: Illinois Athletic Club; Chicago Athletic Club
- 1909-1912: University of Chicago; Alonzo Stagg, Coach

Coaching career (HC unless noted)

Football
- 1920–1921: Columbia College (IA)

Primary Career
- 1915-: General Manager; Dubuque Boat and Boiler works

Accomplishments and honors

Awards
- James E. Sullivan All American Team (1911)
Medal record
Men's athletics
Representing the United States
Bronze medal – third place	1912 Stockholm	800 metres

Ira Nelson Davenport (October 13, 1887 – July 17, 1941) was an American track athlete, who competed in the Men's 800 metres event at the 1912 Stockholm Olympics. As a multisport athlete, he also played football, for the University of Chicago, baseball for the Tonakawa University Prep School in Oklahoma, and served as a coach for Columbia College from 1920 to 1921.

== Early life ==
Ira Davenport was born into a large family on a farm in Winfield Kansas, to George and Anna Dara Pigg Davenport on October 13, 1887. When Davenport was five, the family moved to the "Cherokee Strip" in North Central Oklahoma's town of Tonakawa where by the age of 10, Ira began herding cattle on foot. The running required to herd cattle, and the frequent four mile run to school and back helped condition him as a future track athlete. By the age of 16, he learned to operate a threshing machine to help pay his expenses at prep school. As a student in Tonakawa, at the University Preparatory School, a three-year college prep program, he set a new prep school world's record in the 100 yard dash. He also excelled in baseball as a prep student, playing first base and batting .320. As a prep student with diverse track and field skills, he competed in the pole vault, hurdles, discus, and broad jump. Recognized as a leader, Davenport served as Senior Class President in 1908, and was class valedictorian. He graduated the University Preparatory School in 1908 where he was coached by A.A. Mason.

At the sixth annual Interscholastic meet in Tonkawa, Oklahoma, held at Marshal Field at the University of Chicago in 1908 in his High School Senior year, Davenport won the 100 yard dash in a time of 10.4, the 220 yard dash in a time of 22.2 seconds, and the 440 yard dash in a record time of 51.2 seconds.

At the fourth interscholastic meet in Norman Oklahoma held on April 25, 1908, Davenport established a new world prep school record with a time of 9.8 seconds in the 100 yard dash, and also won the 220 yard dash in 23 seconds, and the 440 yard dash, setting three new state records.

For a time before the Olympics, Davenport lived in Minneapolis, Minnesota, where he attended Minneapolis Central High School before going on to the University of Chicago.

== University of Chicago ==
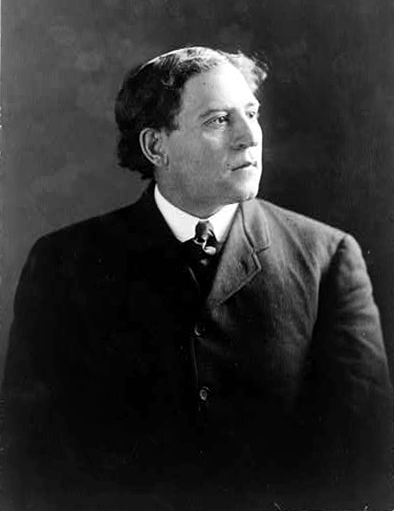
Coach Amos Stagg, 1906

Attending from the Fall of 1908 to June, 1912, Davenport ran track and played football at the University of Chicago, where he was coached in both sports by Hall of Fame Chicago Head Coach Amos Alonzo Stagg . A former player for Yale, Stagg coached track at the University of Chicago from 1896 to 1913, and also coached baseball and football. Davenport earned much of his way in college working as an advertising solicitor. Though he played half and quarter back on Chicago's football team in 1908–1909, he centered his collegiate career on Track, and ran track in all four years. Recognized as a strong runner by the age of 20, he won the 440, 200, and 100 yard race at the 1908 Interscholastic meet in Chicago after graduating prep school, and shortly before enrolling at the university. In club competition, Davenport competed for both the Illinois Athletic Club, and the Chicago Athletic Association.

In February, 1912, while still attending the University of Chicago, he lost a close quarter mile race to Jim Rosenberg of New York, who won the competition in a time of :51 seconds. At the University of Chicago, Davenport won the quarter and half mile distances at the Western Conference meet in both 1911 and 1912, with 1912 times of 49.6 and 1:56.6.

== Honors ==
In February 1911, he was selected by James E. Sullivan as a member of the Collegiate All American team for his achievements in the 400 meter (Quarter Mile) event.<

== 1912 Stockholm Olympics ==
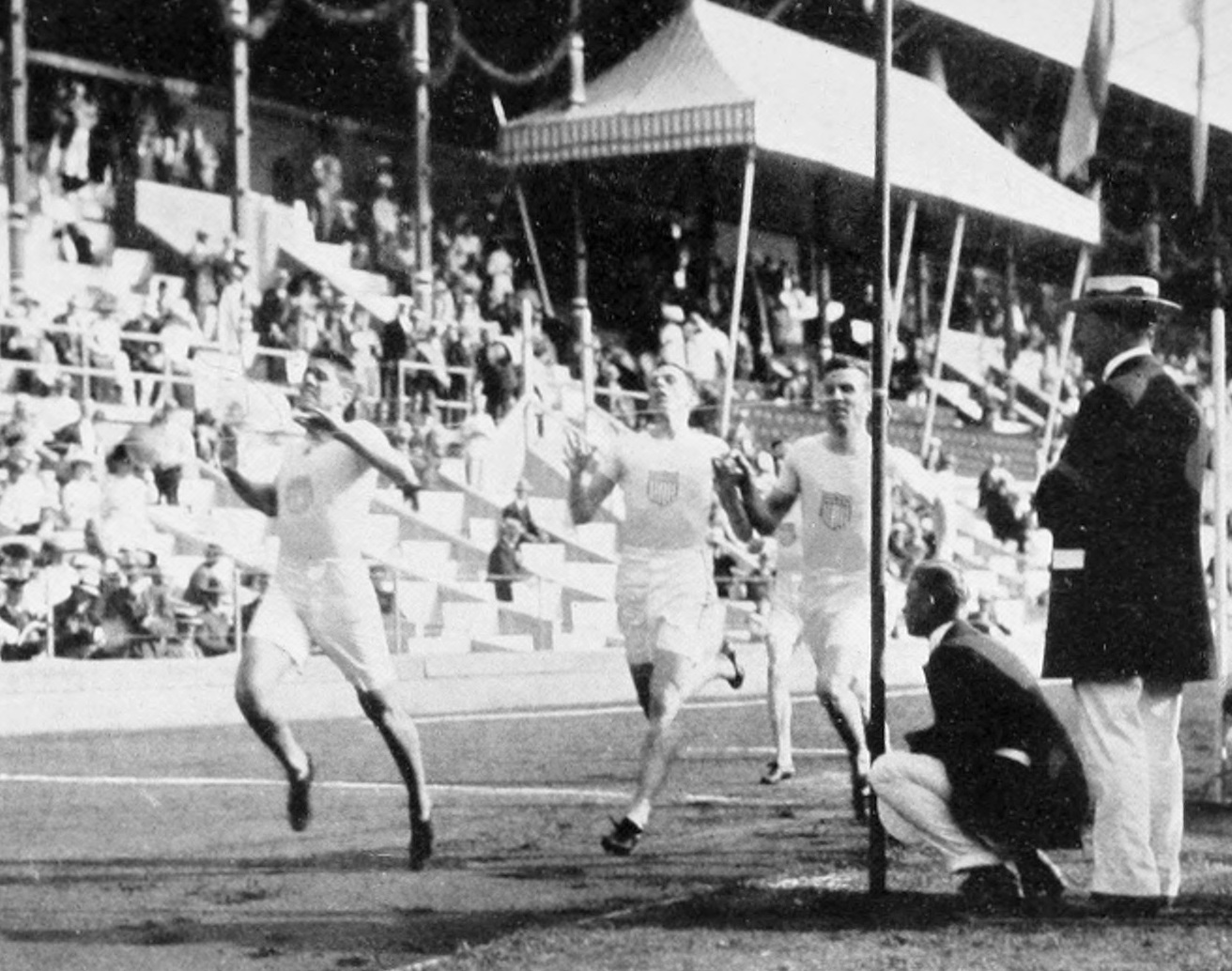
1912 Olympic 800-meter finish; (L to R) Meredith, Sheppard, and Davenport

After graduating the University of Chicago in June 1912, he competed in the 1912 Summer Olympics held in Stockholm, Sweden in the 800 metres, around a half mile, where he won the bronze medal. American Ted Meredith had been the pre-game favorite having won the AAU 880 title in 1911. Davenport accelerated near the end of the event in the last 200 meters, and though he placed third with a time of 1:52.0, he was less than a second from the first place gold medal finisher Ted Meredith of the U.S. who recorded a world record time of 1:51.9. Mel Sheppard of the U.S. team took the silver with a time of 1:52.0, finishing exceedingly close to Davenport who finished close behind. The order of finish for the fourth-, fifth-, and sixth-place finishers were considered to be estimates.

In the 400 metres event he was eliminated in the semi-finals. He also competed for the United States in the exhibition baseball tournament in Stockholm held during the 1912 Summer Olympics.

=== Marriage ===
On January 17, 1914, Davenport married Phyllis Maude Schreiner at her parent's home in Dubuque, Iowa. Schreiner had graduated the University of Chicago where the couple likely met. They had a daughter.

== Careers ==
For his primary career, Davenport served as the general manager and treasurer of the Dubuque Boat and Boiler Works. He relocated to Dubuque, Iowa from Chicago on January 1, 1915, and began a position as the superintendent of construction for the Boat and Boiler Works of Dubuque. He became secretary-treasurer in 1916, and was later promoted to general manager. He operated the business on his own by 1921.

He served as the head football coach at Columbia College in Dubuque, Iowa, now known as Loras College, from 1920 to 1921.

=== Community work ===
Davenport served as a member of the Dubuque Community School District board of education from 1921 to 1925 in an important period during the building of three district schools. He was a YMCA trustee, and from 1924 to 1928 chaired the Republican Central Committee. He served on the Dubuque Chamber of Commerce Board of Directors in 1932.

On July 17, 1941, after a lingering illness of around five weeks, Davenport died in Dubuque, Iowa where he had lived since 1914-1915 and worked for the Dubuque Boat and Boiler Works. He was survived by his wife, the former Phyllis Schreiner, and a daughter. Funeral services were held on July 19, 1941, and he was buried at Dubuque's Linwood Cemetery.
