= Vahram Papazyan (athlete) =

Armenian middle-distance runner

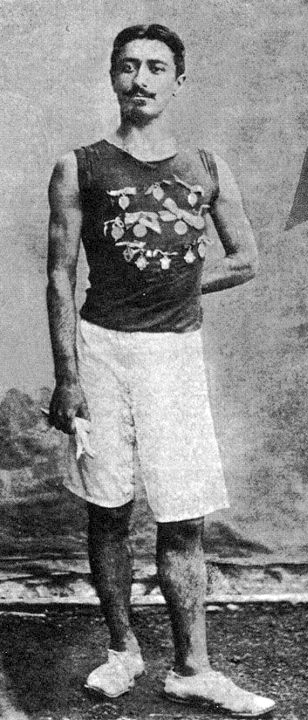

Personal information
- Nationality: Ottoman/American (after 1922)
- Born: 12 September 1892 Istanbul, Ottoman Empire
- Died: 6 March 1986 (aged 93) United States

Sport
- Sport: Track and field
- Events: 800 metres, 1500 metres
- Club: Ardavast
- Updated on 4 February 2013

Vahram Papazyan (Armenian: Վահրամ Փափազեան, romanized: Vahram P’ap’azean; 12 September 1892 – 6 March 1986) was an Armenian athlete. He was one of two athletes that represented the Ottoman Empire's first official appearance in the Olympic Games. Vahram Papazyan, along with fellow Armenian Mıgırdiç Mıgıryan, were the only two athletes who represented the empire in the country's first official participation of the Olympics. Papazyan participated in Men's 800 metres and Men's 1500 metres.

== Life ==
Of Armenian descent, Vahram Papazyan was born in Istanbul and was the son of Sarkis, who was a newsstand owner. During the dawn of every morning, Papazyan would run from his residence in the Bebek neighborhood of Istanbul to the Babiali to pick up news and return it to his father's kiosk. After completing this task, Papazyan ran to Robert College where he attended school.

In the 1906 Intercalated Games held in Athens, Vahram Papazyan participated in the 800 meters and 1,500 meters run finishing 8th place and not finishing respectively. At the age of 13 years and 256 days, Papazyan was the youngest man to compete at the 1906 Athens Olympics.

When Turkey was admitted to the International Olympic Committee (IOC) in 1911, president of Turkey's Olympic committee Selim Sırrı Tarcan placed advertisements in the local Ikdam and Sabah newspapers in order to recruit athletes for the 1912 Olympic Games in Stockholm. Papazyan immediately responded to the advertisement and expressed his desires to participate in the games.

In order to cover the costs of the trip, Vahram Papazyan requested financial assistance from the Armenian sports club Ardavast, of which he was a member. In order to raise money and awareness for Papazyan, the Ardavast sports club organized a theatrical play at the Greek Theatre in the Arnavutköy neighborhood of Istanbul where Papazyan himself played a minor acting role. Due to the event's success, the funds ultimately covered Papazyan's entire Olympic expenses.

Upon arriving in Stockholm, Papazyan noticed that the streets and important buildings were adorned with flags of all the countries participating in the Olympic Games, but there was no Ottoman flag:

I took a car and went straight to the Turkish embassy to express my anger. With suitcases still in hand, I demanded immediate action. After introducing myself and receiving congratulations from the ambassador, I said: "Bey Effendi, Stockholm is depressing to me, and I would like to return to my country with my suitcases on my arm. All of Stockholm is adorned with foreign flags, but not the Turkish flag, and this is an insult to me and my country. I will only stay here if measures are taken so the flag of my country flies among all the others. The Turkish ambassador petrified for a moment. Like many others, he couldn’t believe that an Armenian could have such a strong love and respect for their Turkish country. He probably did not realize the clear fact that the Armenians have always loved their Turkish country, that it was the Turks who didn’t love their loyal Armenian subjects, and have always been persecuting them on each occasion...

— Papazyan

And two hours later, the Turkish flag was flying on every corner, thanks to a young Armenian, who in a few years would be mourning millions of unburied corpses of Armenians, all of them having been massacred by the Turks.

— Dr. Hayk Demoyan on Papazyan’s memoirs

After participating in the Olympics, Vahram Papazyan returned to the Ottoman Empire. After graduating from Robert College in 1913, he was instrumental in the founding of the Armenian General Athletic Association.

When the Armenian genocide ensued, Papazyan managed to survive and eventually settled in Beirut.

He married Annette Egavian and had two sons named Robert and Harold and two daughters named Yolanda and Diane.

Vahram Papazyan ultimately moved to the United States, where he became an electrical engineer. He was associated with Eddy & Co. in Providence, Rhode Island, for more than 35 years before retiring. He died in the Armenian Home for the Aged in Emerson at the age of 92. He is buried at the Swan Point Cemetery in Providence, Rhode Island.

== Olympics ==
Fifth Olympic games in Stockholm, second from the right is Vahram Papazyan

In the 1912 Summer Olympics, Vahram Papazyan did not finish both the Men's 800 metres and Men's 1500 metres.

According to the Turkish Ministry of Youth and Sports, during the Men's 1500 metres, Vahram Papazyan had a "fabulous tempo" and was leading the race, which positioned him for first place. However, when about 20–25 meters remained in the race, Papazyan suddenly felt dizzy and collapsed.

However, according to Vahram Papazyan's grandson, the reasons why Vahram Papazyan did not finish the races were entirely different. According to his grandson:

I remember stories about my grandfather, Vahram Papazian, who ran the Decathlon in the 1912 Olympics in Stockholm. Grandpa would tell us how, suddenly, two lengths ahead of the nearest contender, it dawned on him that if he won, the Turkish flag would be raised. So he stopped.

On the other hand, it is reported by the Armenian weekly Agos newspaper that in a letter written while he was still in Beirut, Vahram Papazyan was disappointed that Turkish flags were not used as part of the Olympic decorations in the city of Stockholm. According to the letter, Papazyan went to the local Turkish embassy and expressed his concerns.

== See also ==
- 1906 Intercalated Games
- Turkey at the 1912 Summer Olympics
- National Olympic Committee of Turkey
