= Teofil Savniky =

Hungarian middle-distance runner and writer

Personal information
- Nationality: Hungarian
- Born: 19 May 1894 Budapest, Hungary
- Died: 23 January 1966 (aged 71) Leányfalu, Hungary

Sport
- Sport: Middle-distance running
- Event: 1500 metres

Teofil Savniky (19 May 1894 – 23 January 1966) was a Hungarian middle-distance runner. He competed in the men's 1500 metres at the 1912 Summer Olympics. He was also a writer, and his work was part of the literature event in the art competition at the 1936 Summer Olympics. Savniky was a national champion runner and later a prominent sports journalist and poet for several decades under the name of Teofil Marschalkó.
