= The Inter-State Tattler =

New York City-based newspaper (1925 to 1932)

The Inter-State Tattler, previously known as The Tattler and The Hotel Tattler, was a New York City-based newspaper published from 1925 to approximately 1932. The newspaper primarily served the African American community in Harlem, New York, where its publication covered a variety of prevalent local topics, events, and news. Popular sections included advice columns, local news and gossip, editorials, sports, and personality profiles. A product of and influence on the Harlem Renaissance, The Inter-State Tattler gained national recognition as an influential newspaper amongst the African American community, with prominent civil rights activist W. E. B. Dubois requesting a periodical exchange between The Inter-State Tattler and The Crisis magazine.

== History ==
The Inter-State Tattler was a continuation of previous Harlem-based African American newspapers called The Hotel Tattler (1922–1924) and The Tattler (1924–1925). While the founder of The Inter-State Tattler, The Tattler, and The Hotel Tattler remain unknown, The Inter-State Tattler newspaper had many notable editors, including Theophilus Lewis, Bennie Butler (1925), Geraldyn Dismond (1929), and George B. Jones (1931). The first volume of The Inter-State Tattler was published by The Inter-State Tattler Co., located at 2305 Seventh Avenue, Harlem New York, on February 27, 1925, and was titled "Vol. 1, no. 1."

While originally published in Harlem and distributed throughout New York City among the African American community, The Inter-State Tattler gained nation-wide recognition as an influential African American newspaper. Most of The Inter-State Tattler's publications coverage was Harlem, but the newspaper spread its influence and began to cover news, stories, events, and profiles in other major cities during later years of publication. Coverage eventually spread to cities throughout the United States, including Buffalo, Saratoga Springs, Detroit, Boston, St. Louis, Chicago, Atlanta, New Orleans, Cleveland, Philadelphia, Atlantic City, and Baltimore.

== Purpose ==
During its early years as a weekly African American newspaper, The Inter-State Tattler featured columns that detailed both society news and social events occurring throughout Harlem, New York City. Shortly after its re-emergence in 1925, The Inter-State Tattler became one of the leading social journals during the early-1930s due to its popular coverage on Harlem nightlife. The Inter-State Tattler's coverage on social events at bars, nightclubs, and theaters proved to be more in-demand by readers than past coverage on club and society-related events, where it hailed itself as "America's Great Pictorial Weekly".

The Inter-State Tattler had two primary columns in which writers reported; the social news column and the nightlife column. While the social news column was at first the primary focus of The Inter-State Tattler and its predecessors, the nightlife column gained immense popularity during the 1930s amidst the backdrop of the Harlem Renaissance. The articles published by The Inter-State Tattler during the Harlem Renaissance exemplify the new focus on nightlife within the African American community during the early 20th century, where The Inter-State Tattler featured many notable column writers to report on such events. Popular African American author and editor Geraldine Dismond created a "Social Snapshots" and "Harlem Night-Life" column for The Inter-State Tattler, which detailed the lively and ostentatious social events of Harlem. Her influential columns covered the social affairs of the African American community, where she often detailed the specificities of the events, who was in attendance, and any performances that occurred during these gatherings in a narrative fashion that reserved judgment or commentary. The majority of The Inter-State Tattler columns followed suit with the style of Dismond's publications, where an observant, detailed, reporter-like recollection of events quickly became the primary source for news and information about the relevant social events occurring throughout Harlem.

== Significance ==
The Inter-State Tattler was an influential publication during the early 20th century because of its unique feature of offering various columns covering nightlife in the African American community. This feature of The Inter-State Tattler was a defining new characteristic of African American periodicals, where The Inter-State Tattler served as one of the pioneers of developing journalistic coverage of city nightlife. Furthermore, heavily influenced by the Harlem Renaissance, the stylistic choices of the nightlife columns reflect the "mark the text with the linguistic creativity and invention of a specific historical moment." The Inter-State Tattler offered an informative yet carefree recollection of prominent social events in Harlem, where such coverage was highly valued by readers who were leaning away from the focus on more downcast or serious events. The Inter-State Tattler ultimately exemplifies a Harlem-Renaissance influenced publication that both pioneered a new genre of African American periodicals and a new style of periodical writing.
