= Willie Jahn =

German middle-distance runner

Personal information
- Full name: Wilhelm Hans Jahn
- Born: 27 February 1889 Magdeburg, German Empire
- Died: 24 January 1973 (aged 83) Hannover, West Germany

Sport
- Country: Germany
- Sport: Men's athletics

Wilhelm Hans "Willie" Jahn (27 February 1889 – 24 January 1973) was a German track and field athlete who competed in the 1912 Summer Olympics.

== Biography ==
Jahn was born in Magdeburg, Germany, to a family of publishers. He attended school in Berlin and joined the Wandervogel (German reform youth movement) while in high school (Gymnasium) in Berlin-Charlottenburg.

In 1912, he participated in the 1912 Stockholm Olympics in the 800m event. He was eliminated in the first round of the 800 meters competition, while his friend Hanns Braun moved up to take the bronze medal.

Jahn became a leader in the Wandervogel, part of the German Youth Movement. As such, he co-led the IWV (Jungwandervogel) for many years with Willie Jansen, participating at the famous 1913 Hohen Meissner meeting. As the Wandervogel movement was concerned with health and life reform for German youth, track and field became a central element of life in the organization, which led to Jahn's ultimate appearance at the 1912 Olympics. A statue of Jahn as a Greek Olympic athlete (Der Sieger) was created by Prof. Peterich and is currently on display in the German Museum of Athletics (Deutsches Sportmuseum) in Berlin, close to the Olympiastadion.

Besides track and field, Jahn was very engaged in kayaking trips (Wanderpaddeln), another facet of the outdoor activities of the Wandervogel. A crucial element of the Wandervogel movement that shaped Jahn's life was the rediscovery of German folk songs. Jahn was an accomplished guitar and lute player and a composer of songs in the German folkloristic style. His best-known song "Laue Luft kommt blau geflossen" was to set music to the words by German poet Joseph Eichendorff. Other songs include "Wir wollen zu Land ausfahren" und "Aus feuchtem Grunde". A number of books that compile his compositions have been published.

Plans to run the family publishing business in Berlin were thwarted by World War II, which destroyed the art publishing business and the community newspaper. Wilhelm Jahn was the editor in chief of the genealogical journal Familie, Sippe, Volk in Berlin. He later served in Denmark as an Officer (Major) of the German Armed Forces and contracted tuberculosis in a British POW camp after the war. The family, which had been scattered due to the Allied terror bombing of Berlin, reunited in a displaced people's camp in Ovelgönne in the late 1940s. His wife, Maria Jahn (nicknamed "Tuck"), suffered serious health problems from the displacement experience and the unsanitary conditions, which led to her early demise shortly after World War II. Jahn himself never fully recovered from tuberculosis and ultimately succumbed to it in 1973 in his new residence in Hannover-Kleefeld. He is buried in the public cemetery in Ilten, Lower-Saxony, Germany (close to Hannover).
