= Karl Haglund =

Swedish middle-distance runner

Karl Haglund (24 September 1890 – 5 November 1971) was a Swedish track and field athlete, who competed in the 1912 Summer Olympics. In 1912, he was eliminated in the first round of the 800 metres competition.
