= Frederick Hulford =

British middle-distance runner

Personal information
- Born: 6 February 1883 Ely, England
- Died: 23 January 1976 (aged 92) Winchmore Hill, London, England

Sport
- Sport: Athletics
- Event: middle-distance
- Club: Birchfield Harriers

Frederick Henry Hulford (6 February 1883 – 23 January 1976) was a British track and field athlete who competed in the 1912 Summer Olympics.

== Biography ==
Born in 1883, Hulford became the National 4 miles champion after winning the AAA Championships title at the 1906 AAA Championships.

At the 1912 Olympic Games, he was eliminated in the semi-finals of the 800 metres competition. He was eliminated in the first round in the 1500 metres event.
