= Frederick Hedlund =

American middle-distance runner

Oscar Frederick Hedlund (August 26, 1887, Woburn, Massachusetts – December 8, 1971, Cambridge, Massachusetts) was an American track and field athlete who competed in the 1912 Summer Olympics.

In 1912, he participated in the final of the 1500 metres competition. He finished second in his qualifying heat. His result in the final is not exactly known (listed as "also competed"), but he finished the race in place nine to fourteen.
