= Albert Hare =

British middle-distance runner

Personal information
- Nationality: British
- Born: 12 May 1887 New Cross, London, England
- Died: 23 December 1969 (aged 82) Bexhill-on-Sea, East Sussex, England

Sport
- Country: United Kingdom
- Sport: Track and field
- Event: 1500 metres

Albert Hare (12 May 1887 – 23 December 1969) was a British track and field athlete who competed in the 1912 Summer Olympics in Stockholm, Sweden.

In 1912, he was eliminated in the first round of the 1500 metres competition. He was born in New Cross, London and died in Bexhill-on-Sea.
