= 1915 USA Outdoor Track and Field Championships =

American athletics championship event

- Dates: 7 August (men)
- Host city: San Francisco, California (men)
- Venue: Panama–Pacific International Exposition (men)
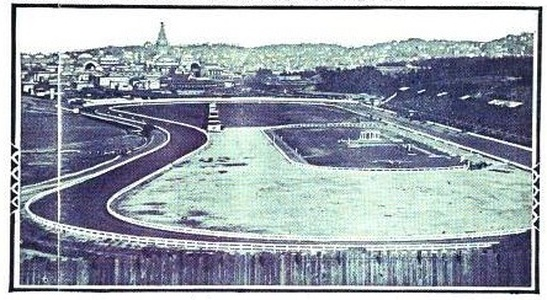

The 1915 USA Outdoor Track and Field Championships were organized by the Amateur Athletic Union (AAU) and served as the national championships in outdoor track and field for the United States.

The men's edition was held at the Panama–Pacific International Exposition in San Francisco, California, and it took place 7 August. The first women's championships were not held until 1923.

There was a strong tailwind aiding performances, leading to marks equal or superior to the world record set in the 440 yards hurdles, triple jump, 220 yards, 440 yards, 120 yards hurdles, and 220 yards hurdles. The first standard U.S. championship decathlon (distinct from the all-around competition) was also held two days after the main meet.

== Results ==
Event	Gold		Silver		Bronze	
100 yards	Joseph Loomis	9.8 w	Alvah Meyer		Roy Morse	
220 yards	Roy Morse	21.2 w	Harold Smith		Alvah Meyer	
440 yards (Note: Held on a straight track)	Ted Meredith	47.0 w	Frank Sloman	3 yards behind	Binga Dismond	1 foot behind 2nd
880 yards	LeRoy Campbell	2:01.0	David Caldwell	1 yard behind	Joseph Higgins	1 foot behind 2nd
1 mile	Joseph Ray	4:23.2	Norman Taber	8 yards behind	Ivan Meyers	
5 miles	Hannes Kolehmainen (FIN)	25:50.8	Oliver Millard	inches behind	G. Hobgood	
120 yards hurdles (Note: Fred Kelly originally finished first but was disqualified for knocking down hurdles.)	Frederick Murray	15.0 w	Robert Simpson		Harry Kirkpatrick	
440 yards hurdles	William Meanix	52.6 w	Eugene Lighter		Harry Goelitz	
High jump	George Horine	1.85 m	Clinton Larsen		L. Nicholls	
Pole vault	Samuel Bellah	3.88 m	Edward Knourek		C. W. Bergstrom	
Long jump	Harry Worthington	7.26 m	Platt Adams		William Sisson	6.96 m w
Triple jump	Daniel Ahearn	15.52 m w	Platt Adams		M. J. Fahey	
Shot put	Arlie Mucks	14.93 m	Lee Talbott		Edgar Caughey	
Discus throw	Arlie Mucks	44.73 m w	Charles Bachmann		Lee Talbott	
Hammer throw	Patrick James Ryan	53.71 m	Lee Talbott		James McEachern	
Javelin throw	George Bronder	54.14 m	Chester Fee		Harry Liversedge	
Decathlon	Alma Richards	6858.81 pts	Avery Brundage	6459.34 pts	Chester Fee	6442.71 pts
220 yards hurdles	Feg Murray	23.6				
Weight throw for distance	Lee Talbott	10.91 m				
Pole vault for distance	Platt Adams	26 ft 7 1/4 in (8.1 m)				

== See also ==
- 1915 USA Indoor Track and Field Championships
- List of USA Outdoor Track and Field Championships winners (men)
- List of USA Outdoor Track and Field Championships winners (women)
