= 1910 Italian Athletics Championships =

- Dates: 8–9 October
- Host city: Milan
- Level: Senior
- Events: 12

The 1910 Italian Athletics Championships were held in Milan. It was the fifth edition of the Italian Athletics Championships.

== Champions ==
Event	Athlete	Performance
100 m	Franco Giongo	11.4
400 m	Franco Giongo	54.2
1000 m	Guido Calvi	2.44.4
5000 m	Giuseppe Cattro	16:09.8
Half marathon (20 km track)	Pericle Pagliani	1:13:00.4
Marathon (40 km road)	Antonio Fraschini	2:38:46.2
110 m hurdles	Emilio Brambilla	17.6
1200 m steeplechase	Angelo Vigani	3:42.4
1500 m walk	Fernando Altimani	6:53.0
10,000 m walk	Fernando Altimani	50:49.0
40 km walk	Italo Bertola	3:50:48
4×440 yards relay	Athletic Club Turin; Secondo Artino, Roberto Bacolla, Massimo Cartasegna, Franco Giongo	3:43.0
