= Paavo Aho =

Finnish track and field athlete

Paavo Aho (22 December 1891 – 19 April 1918) was a Finnish track and field athlete who competed in the 1912 Summer Olympics. In 1912 he finished sixth in the two handed shot put competition and tenth in the shot put event.

He was born in Helsinki and was executed during the Finnish Civil War, having been captured while acting as a local White Guard commander in Hamina.
