= Lewis Anderson (runner) =

American middle-distance runner

Personal information
- Born: May 7, 1890 Genoa, Nebraska, United States
- Died: May 4, 1958 (aged 67) Lincoln, Nebraska, United States

Sport
- Sport: Middle-distance running
- Event: 1500 metres

Lewis Anderson (May 7, 1890 – May 4, 1958) was an American middle-distance runner. He competed in the men's 1500 metres at the 1912 Summer Olympics.
