= Armando Cortesão =

Portuguese athlete (1891–1977)

Personal information
- Nationality: Portuguese
- Born: 31 January 1891 São João do Campo, Portugal
- Died: 29 November 1977 (aged 86) Lisbon, Portugal

Sport
- Sport: Sprinting
- Events: 400 metres, 800 metres

Armando Cortesão (31 January 1891 – 29 November 1977) was a Portuguese agronomic engineer, colonial administrator, cartographer, and historian of Portuguese cartography. He also competed in the men's 400 metres and men's 800 metres at the 1912 Summer Olympics.

== Biography ==
=== Early life and education ===
Armando Zuzarte Cortesão was born in 1891 at São João do Campo, near Coimbra, Portugal. He was originally trained as an agronomist, graduating in 1913. His elder brother, Jaime Cortesão, later became a physician and a well-known historian of Portugal.

=== Career in agronomy and colonial service ===
Cortesão began his professional career as head of the Agriculture Department of São Tomé e Príncipe (1916–1920). During this period he collaborated with the Geodetical Mission of São Tomé, directed by Gago Coutinho, and co-authored the map Reconhecimento da Ilha de S. Tomé 1916 a 1918 (published 1920). From 1920 to 1925 he headed the Chefe de Repartição at the Ministry of Colonies, focusing on the agriculture of Portuguese Guinea. His work in West Africa resulted in publications including A teoria da mutação e o melhoramento das plantas—Estudo trematológico (1913) and several other books and articles.

=== Transition to historiography ===
In 1925, Cortesão became head of the Agência Geral das Colónias in Lisbon, a post he held until 1932. He created and directed the Boletim Geral das Colónias, publishing dozens of articles on colonial issues. He turned increasingly towards the history of cartography, beginning with early works on African toponymy. In 1931, he published an article on the discovery of Guinea and Cape Verde. Between 1932 and 1933 he produced eight historical studies, many on early maps. His major contribution came with Cartografia e cartógrafos portugueses dos séculos XV e XVI (1935), two volumes that established his reputation internationally. In 1937, he came to Paris and told Edward Lynam of the Hakluyt Society that he discovered the long-sought codex that held the Suma Oriental of Tome Pires and Livro de Francisco Rodrigues.

=== Exile and later career ===
Cortesão left Portugal in 1938, living in exile until 1952, working mainly in England and France. Unlike his brother Jaime, who focused on Brazil, Armando concentrated on the cartography of Portuguese expansion. He published extensively during his career, including numerous articles and edited volumes. In 1961 he joined the Committee of Management of Imago Mundi, the leading journal of the history of cartography, and became a member of its Board of Directors in 1966.
