= Robert Burton (athlete) =

British middle-distance runner

Robert Burton (11 April 1885 – 14 June 1950) was a British track and field athlete who competed in the 1912 Summer Olympics. In 1912, he was eliminated in the first round of the 800 metres competition.
