= Joseph Caullé =

French middle-distance runner (1885–1915)

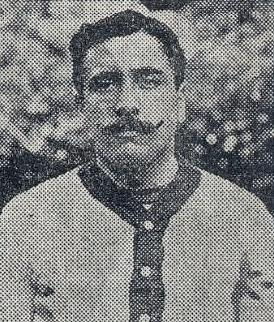

Personal information
- Born: 3 May 1885 Bosc-le-Hard, France
- Died: 1 October 1915 (aged 30) Souchez, France

Sport
- Sport: Track and field
- Event: 800 metres

Joseph Caullé (3 May 1885 – 1 October 1915) was a French middle-distance runner who specialised in the 800 metres. He competed in the men's 800 metres event at the 1912 Summer Olympics. He was killed in action during World War I.

== See also ==
- List of Olympians killed in World War I
