= Andrejs Krūkliņš =

Latvian distance runner

Personal information
- Nationality: Latvian
- Born: 10 January 1891 Riga, Russian Empire
- Died: 30 November 2001 (aged 110)

Sport
- Sport: Long-distance running
- Event: Marathon

Andrejs Krūkliņš (10 January 1891 – 30 November 2001) was a Latvian track and field athlete who competed for the Russian Empire in the 1912 Summer Olympics.

In 1912, he finished 5th in his semi-final heat of the 1500 metres competition and did not advance to the final. He also participated in the marathon event but was not able to finish the race.
