= Rūdolfs Vītols =

Latvian middle-distance runner

Rūdolfs Vītols (April 15, 1892 – March 4, 1942) was a Latvian track and field athlete who competed for the Russian Empire in the 1912 Summer Olympics. In 1912 he was eliminated in the first round of the 1500 metres competition.
