= Louis Madeira =

American middle-distance runner

Louis Childs Madeira III (February 5, 1892 – March 20, 1943) was an American track and field athlete who competed in the 1912 Summer Olympics.

In 1912, he participated in the 1500 metres competition and qualified for the final. His exact result is unknown, but he finished between ninth and 14th place.

Madeira's success in track at the University of Pennsylvania is honored on the medal for the Penn Relays. His likeness is the second athlete meeting Benjamin Franklin.
