= Turkey at the 1912 Summer Olympics =

- Flag of the Ottoman Empire
- IOC code: TUR
- NOC: Ottoman National Olympic Society

in Stockholm
- Competitors: 2 in 1 sport
- Flag bearer: Ünvan Tayfuroğlu
- Medals: Gold 0 Silver 0 Bronze 0 Total 0

Summer Olympics appearances (overview)
- 1908; 1912; 1920; 1924; 1928; 1932; 1936; 1948; 1952; 1956; 1960; 1964; 1968; 1972; 1976; 1980; 1984; 1988; 1992; 1996; 2000; 2004; 2008; 2012; 2016; 2020; 2024

Other related appearances
- 1906 Intercalated Games

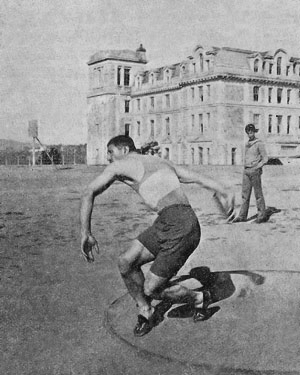
Mıgırdiç Mıgıryan in the discus

The Ottoman Empire (referred to as 'Turkey') competed at the 1912 Summer Olympics in Stockholm, Sweden. This was their second appearance at the Summer Olympics.

== Athletics ==
Two athletes represented Turkey, both of whom were ethnic Armenians. It was the nation's first appearance in the sport of athletics.

Ranks given are within that athlete's heat for running events.

Athlete	Events	Heat		Semifinal		Final	
Athlete	Events	Result	Rank	Result	Rank	Result	Rank
Mıgırdiç Mıgıryan	Shot put	N/A		10.63	19	did not advance	
Mıgırdiç Mıgıryan	Discus throw	N/A		32.98	34	did not advance	
Mıgırdiç Mıgıryan	2 hand shot put	N/A		19.78	7	did not advance	
Mıgırdiç Mıgıryan	Pentathlon	N/A				Elim-3 67	23
Mıgırdiç Mıgıryan	Decathlon	N/A				1527.750	29
Vahram Papazyan	800 m	did not finish		did not advance			
Vahram Papazyan	1500 m	N/A		did not finish		did not advance	
