= Erik Frisell =

Swedish middle-distance runner

Erik Frisell (3 May 1889 – 17 December 1944) was a Swedish track and field athlete who competed in the 1912 Summer Olympics. In 1912 he was eliminated in the first round of the 800 metres competition.
