= Mel Brock (runner) =

Canadian sprinter

Personal information
- Born: February 3, 1888 Thamesford, Ontario
- Died: October 4, 1956 (aged 68) St. Catharines, Ontario

Sport
- Sport: Athletics
- Event: middle distance running
- Club: Varsity Blues, Toronto

George Melville Brock (February 3, 1888 – October 4, 1956) was a Canadian track and field athlete who competed in the 1912 Summer Olympics.

== Biography ==
Brock finished third in the 880 yards event at the British 1911 AAA Championships.

At the 1912 Olympic Games, Brock finished fourth in the 800 metres competition. He was eliminated in the first round in the 400 metres event. He was also a member of the Canadian relay team, which was eliminated in the first round of the 4x400 metre relay event.
