= John Victor (runner) =

South African athlete

Personal information
- Nationality: South African
- Born: 15 April 1892 Brandfort, Orange Free State
- Died: 22 September 1935 (aged 43)

Sport
- Sport: Middle-distance running
- Event: 800 metres

John Victor (15 April 1892 – 22 September 1935) was a South African middle-distance runner. He competed in the men's 800 metres at the 1912 Summer Olympics.
