= Athletics at the 1912 Summer Olympics – Men's two-handed shot put =

Athletics at the Olympics

Men's two handed shot put at the Games of the V Olympiad
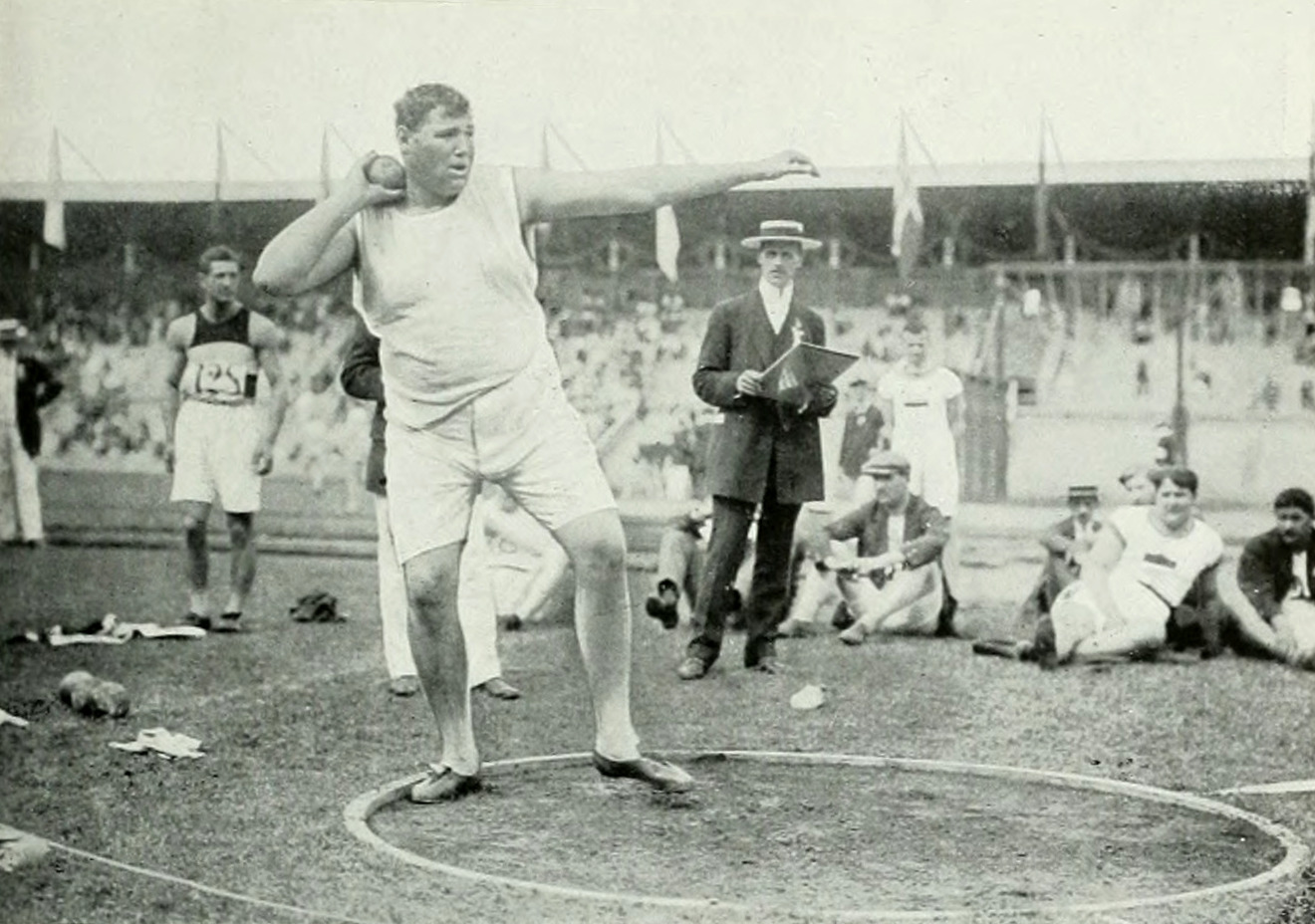
- Rose on the way to win the gold medal.
- Venue: Stockholm Olympic Stadium
- Date: July 11, 1912
- Competitors: 8 from 5 nations

Medalists
1st place, gold medalist(s)		Ralph Rose	United States
2nd place, silver medalist(s)		Pat McDonald	United States
3rd place, bronze medalist(s)		Elmer Niklander	Finland

The men's two handed shot put was a track and field athletics event held as part of the Athletics at the 1912 Summer Olympics programme. It was the only appearance of the event at the Olympics, along with the other two handed throws. The format of the event was such that each thrower threw the shot three times with his right hand and three times with his left hand. The best distance with each hand was summed to give a total. The three finalists received three more throws with each hand. The competition was held on Thursday, July 11, 1912. Seven shot putters from five nations competed. NOCs could enter up to 12 athletes.

== Results ==
The top four throwers were the same as those in the standard shot put event, though in a different order. McDonald, who had won the one-handed event, was not able to match Rose in their best-hand throws a day later. Niklander's excellent off-hand throw in the first round gave him the lead going into the finals.

Rose and McDonald bettered Niklander's off-hand throw in the final, but barely. A nearly even result with the off-hand (Rose won by .02 metres) gave the win to Rose. Niklander, only .02 metres behind McDonald and .04 behind Rose with the off-hand, placed third when his best-hand throw measured more than a metre further than he'd thrown in the standard event.

Place	Athlete	Preliminary					Final			Best mark total
Place	Athlete	1	2	3	Total	Rank	4	5	6	Best mark total
1	Ralph Rose (USA)	15.11	—	15.23	26.50	2nd	14.78	—	15.10	27.70
1	Ralph Rose (USA)	11.04	11.19	11.27	26.50	2nd	11.34	11.65	12.47	27.70
2	Pat McDonald (USA)	14.24	—	—	25.09	3rd	15.08	—	—	27.53
2	Pat McDonald (USA)	11.37	11.74	11.85	25.09	3rd	11.79	12.29	12.45	27.53
3	Elmer Niklander (FIN)	14.24	—	—	26.67	1st	13.55	—	14.71	27.14
3	Elmer Niklander (FIN)	11.84	—	12.43	26.67	1st	12.42	—	—	27.14
4	Lawrence Whitney (USA)	13.48	—	—	24.09	4th				24.09
4	Lawrence Whitney (USA)	10.61	—	—	24.09	4th				24.09
5	Einar Nilsson (SWE)	12.52	—	—	23.37	5th				23.37
5	Einar Nilsson (SWE)	10.05	10.85	—	23.37	5th				23.37
6	Paavo Aho (FIN)	12.54	12.72	—	23.30	6th				23.30
6	Paavo Aho (FIN)	10.25	10.29	10.58	23.30	6th				23.30
7	Mgirdiç Migiryan (TUR)	—	10.85	—	19.78	7th				19.78
7	Mgirdiç Migiryan (TUR)	8.93	—	—	19.78	7th				19.78

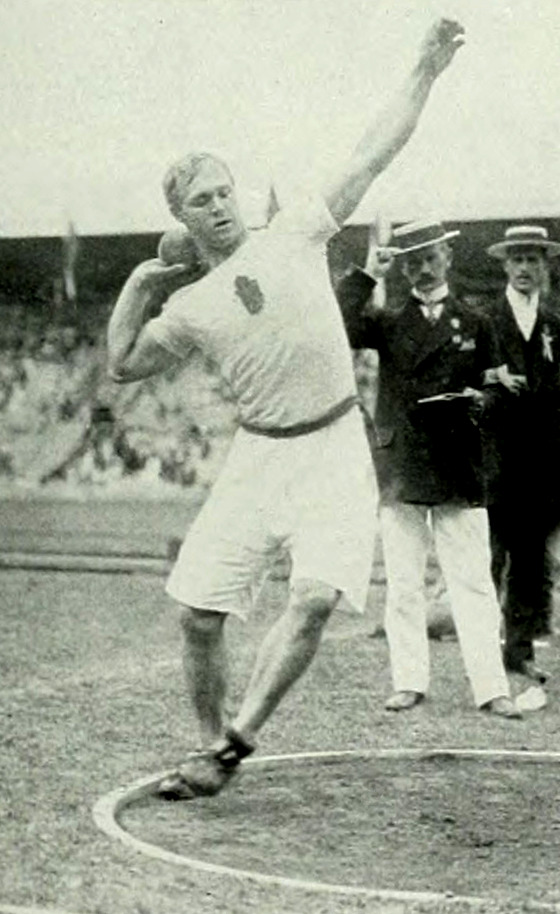
Bronze medalist Elmer Niklander.
