= Henri Arnaud (athlete) =

French middle-distance runner

Henri Auguste Arnaud (16 April 1891 – 21 February 1956) was a French middle-distance runner who was part of the French team at the 1912 Summer Olympics. He reached the finals of the men's 1500 metres race, but did not win a medal.
