= Theophilus Lewis =

American drama critic and magazine editor (1891–1974)

Theophilus Lewis (1891–1974) was an African-American drama critic, writer, and magazine editor during the Harlem Renaissance. Many of his contributions appeared in The Messenger, the socialist African-American magazine founded by A. Philip Randolph and Chandler Owen. Lewis was well known for his staunch support of the advancement of a black aesthetic in the arts, particularly the advancement of plays that represented African-Americans well.

== Biography ==
Born in Baltimore, Lewis idolized H. L. Mencken, the legendary newspaper writer, magazine editor, and literary critic who contributed to The Smart Set, a magazine that Lewis read religiously.

After returning from fighting in World War I, Lewis settled in New York with his family and began working for the Postal Service, a job Lewis held for 33 years and by which he supported his wife and three children. There he met Randolph and Owen and showed them one of his reviews of the local theater, and these men loved Lewis caustic take on the oft-demeaning roles that white playwrights gave African-American actors. Randolph offered to buy Lewis's theater tickets if Lewis would contribute reviews of theatrical productions to The Messenger; this is the only compensation Lewis received for his work.

Lewis had a deep-seated belief that “theater was an essential vehicle through which society could effect and consider social change and cultural development,” and he was especially derisive of the vulgarity and banality that dominated portrayals of African-Americans. The theater productions that included African-Americans almost always cast individuals who were quite fair-skinned, and many of the plays and musicals included nudity and crass humor. He also pushed for more demanding and positive roles for the black actors, which he thought would cultivate a truly black aesthetic that would solidify a “black” cultural identity, as opposed to mimicking the manners, conventions, and customs of white theater productions. According to Theodore Kornweibel, “His fundamental theme, that the primary need of blacks in establishing their own cultural independence was for a national black theater grounded in the works of black playwrights, was a justifiable criticism.” In the July 1926 issue of The Messenger, Lewis condemned the duplicity of upper-class African-Americans, saying “But when the higher type of Negro goes into the theater, he commonly ignores his own tastes [. . .] and demands that the performance be adjusted to a set of standards alien to birth."

During his time at The Messenger, Lewis worked closely with George S. Schuyler, co-authoring a column entitled "Shafts and Darts: A Page of Calumny and Satire.” He also was instrumental in fostering the career of Wallace Thurman, whom Lewis had hired in 1925 to contribute articles and run errands for Lewis's own start-up magazine The Looking Glass. After that magazine folded after a few issues, Lewis convinced Randolph to hire Thurman as an associate editor and writer for The Messenger. After Randolph and Owen left the editorship of The Messenger to devote their time to unionizing, Schuyler and Lewis took over and shifted the magazine's focus away from socialism toward literature, drama, and the arts of the Harlem Renaissance. Lewis emphasized art that demonstrated "sincerity [which], however crudely expressed, is at the root of every true art,” which ran counter to Randolph's socialistic ideals.

After leaving The Messenger after it folded, Lewis continued to write regularly for publications such as Opportunity, Inter-State Tattler, and Amsterdam News. Lewis converted to Catholicism later in life, and after that point his writing appeared in Catholic World, Commonweal, and America. Lewis died in 1974.
