= Guido Calvi =

Italian middle-distance runner

Personal information
- Nationality: Italian
- Born: 1 May 1893 Bergamo
- Died: 6 September 1958 (aged 65) Bergamo

Sport
- Country: Italy
- Sport: Athletics
- Event: Middle-distance running
- Club: Atalanta Bergamo

Guido Calvi (1 May 1893 - 6 September 1958) was an Italian middle-distance runner who competed at the 1912 Summer Olympics.

== National titles ==
- Italian Athletics Championships
  - 1000 metres: 1910
