= Evert Björn =

Swedish athlete

Evert Björn (21 January 1888 – 21 December 1974) was a Swedish athlete. He competed in the 1908 Summer Olympics in London and in the 1912 Summer Olympics in Stockholm.

He did not finish his initial semifinal heat of the 1500 metres in 1908, eliminating him from further competition in that event.

Björn placed third in his semifinal heat of the 800 metres, not advancing to the final despite beating defending champion James Lightbody, who placed fourth in the heat.

== Sources ==
- Cook, Theodore Andrea (1908). The Fourth Olympiad, Being the Official Report. London: British Olympic Association.
- De Wael, Herman (2001). "Athletics 1908". Herman's Full Olympians. Archived from the original on 27 September 2006.
- Wudarski, Pawel (1999). "Wyniki Igrzysk Olimpijskich" (in Polish). Archived from the original on 16 February 2009.
