= Ted Meredith =

Athletics competitor

- Meredith at the 1912 Summer Olympics

Personal information
- Full name: James Edwin Meredith
- Born: November 14, 1891 Chester Heights, Pennsylvania, U.S.
- Died: November 2, 1957 (aged 65) Camden, New Jersey, U.S.
- Occupations: Real Estate broker, Track Coach, IRS Agent
- Height: 1.75 m (5 ft 9 in)
- Weight: 71 kg (157 lb)

Sport
- Sport: Sprint and middle distance running
- College team: University of Pennsylvania
- Club: New York Athletic Club
- Coached by: Jimmy Curran (Mercersburg Acad.); Michael C. Murphy (U. Penn 1912-13); George Orton (U. Penn 1913-15); Lawson Robertson (U. Penn 1916)
- Retired: circa 1920
Medal record
Men's athletics
Representing the United States
Olympic Games
Gold medal – first place	1912 Stockholm	800 metres
Gold medal – first place	1912 Stockholm	4 × 400 m relay

James Edwin "Ted" Meredith (November 14, 1891 – November 2, 1957) was an American middle distance track athlete, and world record holder who competed for the University of Pennsylvania and was the winner of two gold medals at the 1912 Summer Olympics in the Men's 800 metres event, where he set a world record time, and the Men's 4 × 400 m relay. In career pursuits, he worked as a real estate broker, a track coach, and for the Internal Revenue Service.

== Early life ==
Meredith was born November 18, 1891 in Chester Heights, Pennsylvania.

Meredith made the 1912 Olympic team shortly after his graduation from Media, Pennsylvania's Williamson Free School of Mechanical Trades in 1911. In 1912, he was a student at Mercersburg Academy, a strong athletic school, whose track team was managed by Scots-American coach Jimmy Curran. His High School alma mater, the Williamson Free School of Mechanical Trades now has the largest existing repository of Meredith memorabilia thanks to Jack Lemon, author of the book Immortal of the Cinder Path – The Saga of James 'Ted' Meredith who donated his entire collection of Meredith memorabilia.

== 1912 Stockholm Olympics ==
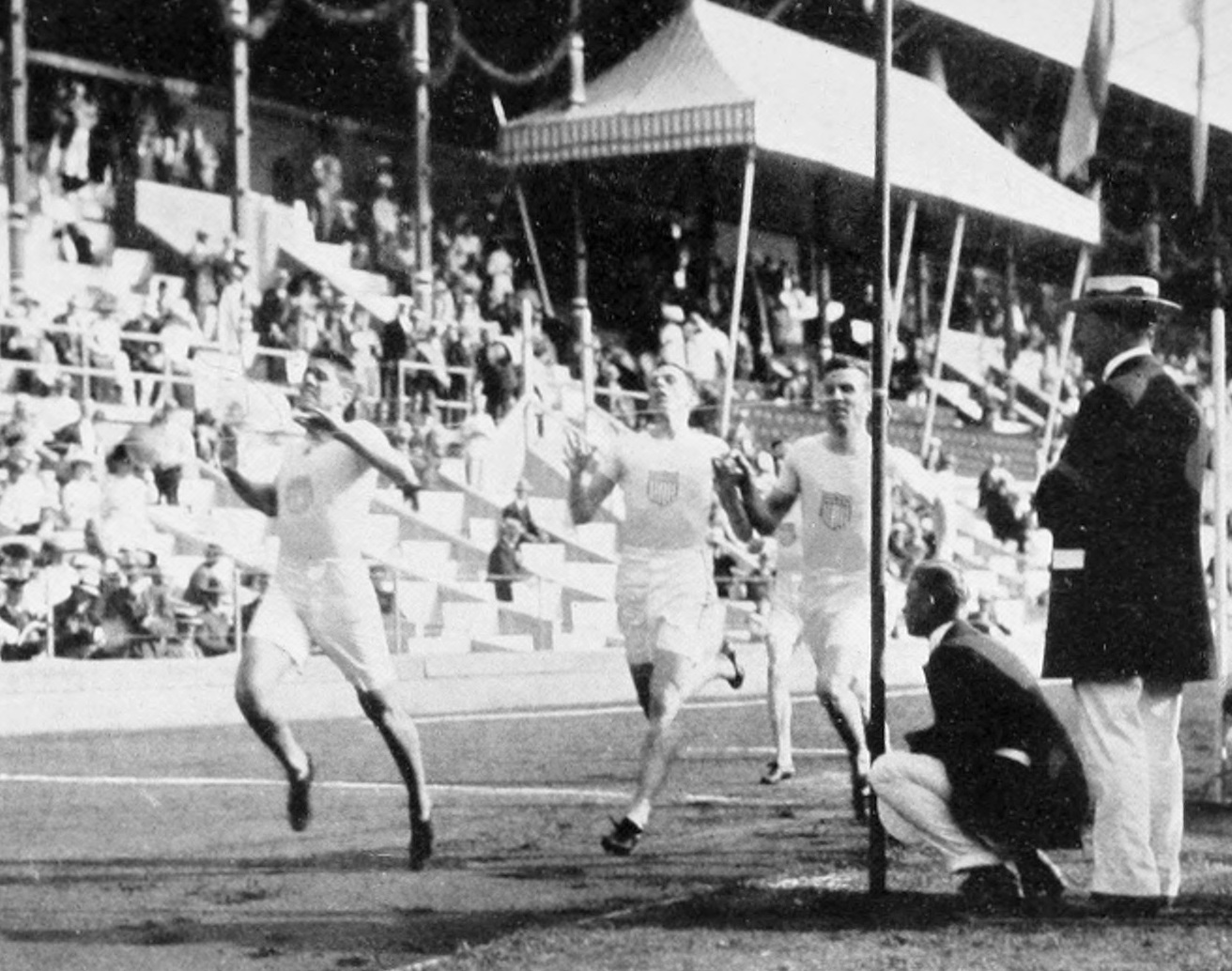
1912 Olympic 800-meter finish; (L to R) Meredith, Sheppard, and Davenport

At the 2012 Stockholm Olympics, Meredith was coached pirmarily by Michael C. Murphy and Lawson Robertson who would both coach him at the University of Pennsylvania. Meredith won a gold medal in the Men's 800 metres event with a world record 1:51.9. He ran on to the 880 yard mark and also set a world record for that distance with a 1:52.5. Meredith had been the pre-game favorite having won the AAU 880 title in 1911. In an extremely close finish, third place finisher Ira Davenport accelerated near the end of the event in the last 200 meters, and though he placed third with a time of 1:52.0, he was less than a second from Meredith. Mel Sheppard of the U.S. team took the silver with a time of 1:52.0, finishing exceedingly close to Davenport who finished close behind. The order of finish for the fourth, fifth, and sixth place finishers were considered to be estimates.

He won another gold medal on the Men's 4 × 400 m relay team that ran a combined time of 3:16.6. The team from France took the silver medal with a time of 3:20.7, and the bronze medal was won by the team from Great Britain, who set a time of 3:23.2. He captured fourth place in the 400 metres competition.

== 1920 Antwerp Olympics ==
He made a comeback for the 1920 Summer Olympics, where he was eliminated in the semifinal of the 400 metres competition despite having set a world record of 47.4 in 1916. He best preliminary time was an estimated 50.8. He also ran on the American relay team that finished fourth in the 4 × 400 m relay event with an estimated time of 3:24.4. In a close finish, the team from Great Britain won the gold with a combined time of 3:22.2, and the team from South Africa took the silver with a time of 3:23.4.

=== University of Pennsylvania ===
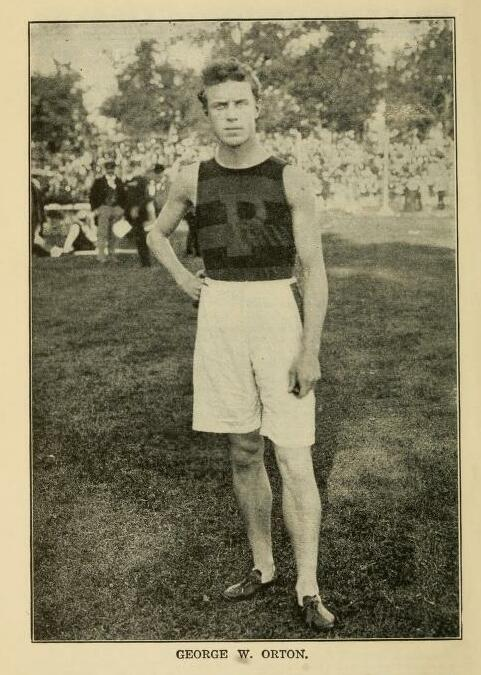
Penn Coach G. Orton, 1897

After the Stockholm Olympics, Meredith entered the University of Pennsylvania around 1912, graduating in 1916. While competing for Penn, he was coached by Michael C. Murphy from 1912-1913, and then by George W. Orton through 1915. In 1916, the Penn track team was managed by Hall of Fame Coach Lawson Robertson. Meredith was the IC4A 440 yards champion from 1914 to 1916 and the 880 yard champion in 1914 and 1915. He won the AAU 440 yard title in 1914 and 1915. In 1916, he set a world record in the 440 yards of 47.4, which remained in effect until 1928. In the same year, he lowered his own world 880 yard record to 1:52.1. In April 1915, he ran the last lap for the University of Pennsylvania team that broke the world mile relay record. Requiring a time of 48 3/5 seconds, he proceeded to run 48 2/5. Included in the quartet was Donald Lippincott. While at Penn, Meredith set the quarter mile world record of 47.2.

=== WWI service ===
Meredith retired for the first time from competition in 1917 and served in the U.S. Army's Signal Corp's Aviation Section during World War I. He would later return to training for the 1920 Olympics.

=== Careers ===
After his second retirement from competition, he became a real estate broker but retained an active interest in athletics. In 1924, he attended the Olympic Games in Paris as a reporter, working for the Christy Walsh Syndicate. In 1928, he was hired as an assistant coach at the University of Pennsylvania under Lawson Robertson. In 1936, he attended the Olympic Games in Berlin as the coach of the Czechoslovakia team. During 1937 and 1938, he trained the Cuban team for the Central American Games. In later years, he worked for the Internal Revenue Service.

Meredith was the author of Middle Distance and Relay Racing in 1924.

=== Honors ===
Meredith became a member of the Philadelphia Sports Hall of Fame in 2011.

== Death and funeral ==
Meredith died at the age of 64 in Cooper Hospital following surgery on November 2, 1957 in Camden, New Jersey. His funeral service was held in Haddonfield, New Jersey. Attendees were a roll call of early 20th century American and Pennsylvanian sports figures, including his Mercersburg track Coach Jimmy Curran, 1920 Olympian and fellow Penn track star Earl Eby, 1912 track Olympian Donald Lippincott, 1920 track Olympian Sherman Landers, Wallace McCurdy, Larry Brown, Joe Lockwood, Robert Bolger, baseball player Joe Berry, fellow Penn football player Allie Miller, Ed Harter, and triple Olympic gold medalist in rowing Paul Costello.

Records
Preceded by Incumbent	Men's 800 metres World Record Holder; July 8, 1912 – July 3, 1926	Succeeded by (Germany) Otto Peltzer
