= Athletics at the 1912 Summer Olympics – Men's decathlon =

Men's decathlon at the Games of the V Olympiad
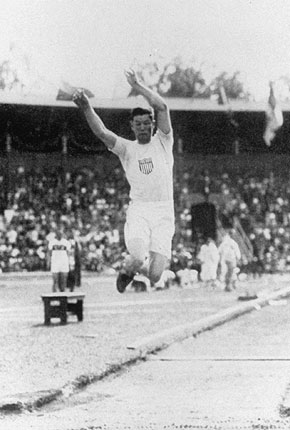
- Gold medalist Jim Thorpe
- Venue: Stockholm Olympic Stadium
- Dates: July 13–15, 1912
- Competitors: 29 from 12 nations

Medalists
1st place, gold medalist(s)		Jim Thorpe	United States
2nd place, silver medalist(s)		Hugo Wieslander	Sweden
2nd place, silver medalist(s)		Charles Lomberg	Sweden
3rd place, bronze medalist(s)		Gösta Holmér	Sweden

The men's decathlon was a track and field athletics event held as part of the athletics at the 1912 Summer Olympics programme. The competition was held from Saturday, July 13, 1912, to Monday, July 15, 1912. It was the first time the decathlon, which had been introduced in 1911, was held at the Olympics; a different ten-event competition, the all-around, had been contested in St. Louis in 1904. Twenty-nine decathletes from twelve nations competed. NOCs could enter up to 12 athletes.

== Results ==
Jim Thorpe's gold medal was stripped by the International Olympic Committee in 1913, after the IOC learned that Thorpe had taken expense money for playing baseball, violating contemporary Olympic amateurism rules, before the 1912 Games. This moved everyone else up in the rankings. In 1982, the IOC was convinced that the disqualification had been improper, as no protest against Thorpe's eligibility had been brought within the required 30 days, and reinstated Thorpe's medals. This made Thorpe and Hugo Wieslander co-champions. In 2022, the IOC decided to display Thorpe as the sole gold medal winner after the Swedish Olympic Committee and Wieslander's surviving family members declared Thorpe should be acknowledged as the sole Olympic champion.

Avery Brundage, president of the IOC from 1952 to 1972, competed in the decathlon finishing in 16th place. Brundage did not start in the last two events of the competition.

=== 100 metres ===
Event 1
Place	Athlete	Time	Score
1	Skotte Jacobsson (SWE)	11.0	952.4
1	Eugene Mercer (USA)	11.0	952.4
3	Frank Lukeman (CAN)	11.2	904.8
3	Jim Thorpe (USA)	11.2	904.8
5	Pierre Failliot (FRA)	11.3	881.0
5	Otto Röhr (GER)	11.3	881.0
7	Gösta Holmér (SWE)	11.4	857.2
8	Einar Nilsson (SWE)	11.5	833.4
8	Valdemar Wickholm (FIN)	11.5	833.4
10	Géo André (FRA)	11.6	809.6
10	Harry Babcock (USA)	11.6	809.6
12	Ferdinand Bie (NOR)	11.7	785.8
13	James Donahue (USA)	11.8	762.0
13	Charles Lomberg (SWE)	11.8	762.0
13	Hugo Wieslander (SWE)	11.8	762.0
16	Alexander Abraham (GER)	12.0	714.4
16	Svend Langkjær (DEN)	12.0	714.4
18	Karl Halt (GER)	12.1	690.6
18	Manlio Legat (ITA)	12.1	690.6
20	Alfreds Alslebens (RUS)	12.2	666.8
20	Avery Brundage (USA)	12.2	666.8
22	Erik Kugelberg (SWE)	12.3	643.0
22	Gunnar Rönström (SWE)	12.3	643.0
22	Josef Schäffer (AUT)	12.3	643.0
22	Aleksandr Schultz (RUS)	12.3	643.0
26	Alfredo Pagani (ITA)	12.4	619.2
26	George Philbrook (USA)	12.4	619.2
28	Viktor Hackberg (SWE)	12.5	595.4
29	Mgirdiç Migiryan (TUR)	13.3	405.0

=== Long jump ===
Event 2
Place	Athlete	Distance	Score
1	Charles Lomberg (SWE)	6.87	850.55
2	Eugene Mercer (USA)	6.84	843.20
3	Jim Thorpe (USA)	6.79	830.95
4	Ferdinand Bie (NOR)	6.69	806.45
5	James Donahue (USA)	6.48	755.00
6	Skotte Jacobsson (SWE)	6.46	750.10
7	Otto Röhr (GER)	6.43	742.75
8	Hugo Wieslander (SWE)	6.42	740.30
9	Avery Brundage (USA)	6.40	735.40
10	George Philbrook (USA)	6.34	720.70
11	Harry Babcock (USA)	6.29	708.45
12	Alfreds Alslebens (RUS)	6.27	703.55
13	Erik Kugelberg (SWE)	6.20	686.40
14	Frank Lukeman (CAN)	6.14	671.70
15	Karl Halt (GER)	6.08	657.00
16	Pierre Failliot (FRA)	6.05	649.65
17	Josef Schäffer (AUT)	6.04	647.20
18	Gunnar Rönström (SWE)	5.99	634.95
19	Gösta Holmér (SWE)	5.98	632.50
20	Valdemar Wickholm (FIN)	5.95	625.15
21	Svend Langkjær (DEN)	5.89	610.45
22	Alfredo Pagani (ITA)	5.83	595.75
23	Aleksandr Schultz (RUS)	5.75	576.15
24	Einar Nilsson (SWE)	5.72	568.80
25	Viktor Hackberg (SWE)	5.64	549.20
26	Géo André (FRA)	5.60	539.40
27	Manlio Legat (ITA)	5.56	529.60
28	Alexander Abraham (GER)	5.52	519.80
29	Mgirdiç Migiryan (TUR)	5.43	497.75

After 2 events
Place	Athlete	1	2	Total
1	Eugene Mercer (USA)	952.4	843.20	1795.60
2	Jim Thorpe (USA)	904.8	830.95	1735.75
3	Skotte Jacobsson (SWE)	952.4	750.10	1702.50
4	Otto Röhr (GER)	881.0	742.75	1623.75
5	Charles Lomberg (SWE)	762.0	850.55	1612.55
6	Ferdinand Bie (NOR)	785.8	806.45	1592.25
7	Frank Lukeman (CAN)	904.8	671.70	1576.50
8	Pierre Failliot (FRA)	881.0	649.65	1530.65
9	Harry Babcock (USA)	809.6	708.45	1518.05
10	James Donahue (USA)	762.0	755.00	1517.00
11	Hugo Wieslander (SWE)	762.0	740.30	1502.30
12	Gösta Holmér (SWE)	857.2	632.50	1489.70
13	Valdemar Wickholm (FIN)	833.4	625.15	1458.55
14	Avery Brundage (USA)	666.8	735.40	1402.20
14	Einar Nilsson (SWE)	833.4	568.80	1402.20
16	Alfreds Alslebens (RUS)	666.8	703.55	1370.35
17	Géo André (FRA)	809.6	539.40	1349.00
18	Karl Halt (GER)	690.6	657.00	1347.60
19	George Philbrook (USA)	619.2	720.70	1339.90
20	Erik Kugelberg (SWE)	643.0	686.40	1329.40
21	Svend Langkjær (DEN)	714.4	610.45	1324.85
22	Josef Schäffer (AUT)	643.0	647.20	1290.20
23	Gunnar Rönström (SWE)	643.0	634.95	1277.95
24	Alexander Abraham (GER)	714.4	519.80	1234.20
25	Manlio Legat (ITA)	690.6	529.60	1220.20
26	Aleksandr Schultz (RUS)	643.0	576.15	1219.15
27	Alfredo Pagani (ITA)	619.2	595.75	1214.95
28	Viktor Hackberg (SWE)	595.4	549.20	1144.60
29	Mgirdiç Migiryan (TUR)	405.0	497.75	902.75

=== Shot put ===
Event 3
Place	Athlete	Distance	Score
1	Jim Thorpe (USA)	12.89	809
2	Einar Nilsson (SWE)	12.83	803
3	George Philbrook (USA)	12.79	799
4	Hugo Wieslander (SWE)	12.14	734
5	Charles Lomberg (SWE)	11.67	687
6	Josef Schäffer (AUT)	11.50	670
7	Alexander Abraham (GER)	11.29	649
8	Avery Brundage (USA)	11.12	632
8	Karl Halt (GER)	11.12	632
10	Valdemar Wickholm (FIN)	11.09	629
11	Mgirdiç Migiryan (TUR)	11.05	625
12	Gösta Holmér (SWE)	10.98	618
13	Gunnar Rönström (SWE)	10.69	589
14	Pierre Failliot (FRA)	10.54	574
15	Viktor Hackberg (SWE)	10.30	550
16	Ferdinand Bie (NOR)	10.20	540
17	Harry Babcock (USA)	10.16	536
18	Aleksandr Schultz (RUS)	10.08	528
19	Erik Kugelberg (SWE)	9.98	518
20	Géo André (FRA)	9.90	510
21	Svend Langkjær (DEN)	9.86	506
22	Otto Röhr (GER)	9.81	501
23	Eugene Mercer (USA)	9.76	496
24	James Donahue (USA)	9.67	487
24	Alfredo Pagani (ITA)	9.67	487
26	Skotte Jacobsson (SWE)	9.35	455
27	Frank Lukeman (CAN)	9.29	449
28	Alfreds Alslebens (RUS)	8.48	368
29	Manlio Legat (ITA)	8.23	343

After 3 events
Place	Athlete	1	2	3	Total
1	Jim Thorpe (USA)	904.8	830.95	809	2544.75
2	Charles Lomberg (SWE)	762.0	850.55	687	2299.55
3	Eugene Mercer (USA)	952.4	843.20	496	2291.60
4	Hugo Wieslander (SWE)	762.0	740.30	734	2236.30
5	Einar Nilsson (SWE)	833.4	568.80	803	2205.20
6	Skotte Jacobsson (SWE)	952.4	750.10	455	2157.50
7	George Philbrook (USA)	619.2	720.70	799	2138.90
8	Ferdinand Bie (NOR)	785.8	806.45	540	2132.25
9	Otto Röhr (GER)	881.0	742.75	501	2124.75
10	Gösta Holmér (SWE)	857.2	632.50	618	2107.70
11	Pierre Failliot (FRA)	881.0	649.65	574	2104.65
12	Valdemar Wickholm (FIN)	833.4	625.15	629	2087.55
13	Harry Babcock (USA)	809.6	708.45	536	2054.05
14	Avery Brundage (USA)	666.8	735.40	632	2034.20
15	Frank Lukeman (CAN)	904.8	671.70	449	2025.50
16	James Donahue (USA)	762.0	755.00	487	2004.00
17	Karl Halt (GER)	690.6	657.00	632	1979.60
18	Josef Schäffer (AUT)	643.0	647.20	670	1960.20
19	Alexander Abraham (GER)	714.4	519.80	649	1883.20
20	Gunnar Rönström (SWE)	643.0	634.95	589	1866.95
21	Géo André (FRA)	809.6	539.40	510	1859.00
22	Erik Kugelberg (SWE)	643.0	686.40	518	1847.40
23	Svend Langkjær (DEN)	714.4	610.45	506	1830.85
24	Aleksandr Schultz (RUS)	643.0	576.15	528	1747.15
25	Alfreds Alslebens (RUS)	666.8	703.55	368	1738.35
26	Alfredo Pagani (ITA)	619.2	595.75	487	1701.95
27	Viktor Hackberg (SWE)	595.4	549.20	550	1694.60
28	Manlio Legat (ITA)	690.6	529.60	343	1563.20
29	Mgirdiç Migiryan (TUR)	405.0	497.75	625	1527.75

=== High jump ===
6 of the 29 starters did not appear for the fourth event.

Event 4
Place	Athlete	Height	Score
1	Jim Thorpe (USA)	1.87	958
2	Charles Lomberg (SWE)	1.80	860
2	George Philbrook (USA)	1.80	860
4	Géo André (FRA)	1.75	790
4	Frank Lukeman (CAN)	1.75	790
4	Hugo Wieslander (SWE)	1.75	790
7	Alfreds Alslebens (RUS)	1.70	720
7	Avery Brundage (USA)	1.70	720
7	Karl Halt (GER)	1.70	720
7	Gösta Holmér (SWE)	1.70	720
7	Einar Nilsson (SWE)	1.70	720
7	Otto Röhr (GER)	1.70	720
13	Ferdinand Bie (NOR)	1.65	650
13	James Donahue (USA)	1.65	650
13	Erik Kugelberg (SWE)	1.65	650
13	Eugene Mercer (USA)	1.65	650
13	Alfredo Pagani (ITA)	1.65	650
18	Gunnar Rönström (SWE)	1.60	580
18	Valdemar Wickholm (FIN)	1.60	580
20	Skotte Jacobsson (SWE)	1.55	510
20	Josef Schäffer (AUT)	1.55	510
20	Aleksandr Schultz (RUS)	1.55	510
23	Alexander Abraham (GER)	1.50	440
24	Harry Babcock (USA)	DNS	0
24	Pierre Failliot (FRA)	DNS	0
24	Viktor Hackberg (SWE)	DNS	0
24	Svend Langkjær (DEN)	DNS	0
24	Manlio Legat (ITA)	DNS	0
24	Mgirdiç Migiryan (TUR)	DNS	0

After 4 events
Place	Athlete	1	2	3	4	Total
1	Jim Thorpe (USA)	904.8	830.95	809	958	3502.75
2	Charles Lomberg (SWE)	762.0	850.55	687	860	3159.55
3	Hugo Wieslander (SWE)	762.0	740.30	734	790	3026.30
4	George Philbrook (USA)	619.2	720.70	799	860	2998.90
5	Eugene Mercer (USA)	952.4	843.20	496	650	2941.60
6	Einar Nilsson (SWE)	833.4	568.80	803	720	2925.20
7	Otto Röhr (GER)	881.0	742.75	501	720	2844.75
8	Gösta Holmér (SWE)	857.2	632.50	618	720	2827.70
9	Frank Lukeman (CAN)	904.8	671.70	449	790	2815.50
10	Ferdinand Bie (NOR)	785.8	806.45	540	650	2782.25
11	Avery Brundage (USA)	666.8	735.40	632	720	2754.20
12	Karl Halt (GER)	690.6	657.00	632	720	2699.60
13	Valdemar Wickholm (FIN)	833.4	625.15	629	580	2667.55
14	Skotte Jacobsson (SWE)	952.4	750.10	455	510	2667.50
15	James Donahue (USA)	762.0	755.00	487	650	2654.00
16	Géo André (FRA)	809.6	539.40	510	790	2649.00
17	Erik Kugelberg (SWE)	643.0	686.40	518	650	2497.40
18	Josef Schäffer (AUT)	643.0	647.20	670	510	2470.20
19	Alfreds Alslebens (RUS)	666.8	703.55	368	720	2458.35
20	Gunnar Rönström (SWE)	643.0	634.95	589	580	2446.95
21	Alfredo Pagani (ITA)	619.2	595.75	487	650	2351.95
22	Alexander Abraham (GER)	714.4	519.80	649	440	2323.20
23	Aleksandr Schultz (RUS)	643.0	576.15	528	510	2257.15
24	Pierre Failliot (FRA)	881.0	649.65	574	0	DNF 2104.65
25	Harry Babcock (USA)	809.6	708.45	536	0	DNF 2054.05
26	Svend Langkjær (DEN)	714.4	610.45	506	0	DNF 1830.85
27	Viktor Hackberg (SWE)	595.4	549.20	550	0	DNF 1694.60
28	Manlio Legat (ITA)	690.6	529.60	343	0	DNF 1563.20
29	Mgirdiç Migiryan (TUR)	405.0	497.75	625	0	DNF 1527.75

=== 400 metres ===
5 more athletes, including the 6th-placed Nilsson, retired after the high jump and did not appear for the fifth event. This brought the number of non-finishers up to 11, leaving 18 to continue the competition.

Event 5
Place	Athlete	Time	Score
1	Eugene Mercer (USA)	49.9	943.60
2	James Donahue (USA)	51.6	879.68
3	Frank Lukeman (CAN)	52.1	860.88
4	Jim Thorpe (USA)	52.2	857.12
5	Valdemar Wickholm (FIN)	52.3	853.36
6	Ferdinand Bie (NOR)	53.2	819.52
6	Gösta Holmér (SWE)	53.2	819.52
8	Hugo Wieslander (SWE)	53.6	804.48
9	Karl Halt (GER)	54.2	781.92
10	Géo André (FRA)	54.5	770.64
11	Aleksandr Schultz (RUS)	54.6	766.88
12	Charles Lomberg (SWE)	55.0	751.84
13	Avery Brundage (USA)	55.2	744.32
14	Erik Kugelberg (SWE)	55.7	725.52
15	Alfredo Pagani (ITA)	56.1	710.48
16	George Philbrook (USA)	56.7	687.92
17	Josef Schäffer (AUT)	58.2	631.52
18	Alfreds Alslebens (RUS)	59.0	601.44
—	Einar Nilsson (SWE)	DNS	0
—	Otto Röhr (GER)	DNS	0
—	Skotte Jacobsson (SWE)	DNS	0
—	Gunnar Rönström (SWE)	DNS	0
—	Alexander Abraham (GER)	DNS	0
—	Pierre Failliot (FRA)	DNS	0
—	Harry Babcock (USA)	DNS	0
—	Svend Langkjær (DEN)	DNS	0
—	Viktor Hackberg (SWE)	DNS	0
—	Manlio Legat (ITA)	DNS	0
—	Mgirdiç Migiryan (TUR)	DNS	0

After 5 events
Place	Athlete	1	2	3	4	5	Total
1	Jim Thorpe (USA)	904.8	830.95	809	958	857.12	4359.87
2	Charles Lomberg (SWE)	762.0	850.55	687	860	751.84	3911.39
3	Eugene Mercer (USA)	952.4	843.20	496	650	943.60	3885.20
4	Hugo Wieslander (SWE)	762.0	740.30	734	790	804.48	3830.78
5	George Philbrook (USA)	619.2	720.70	799	860	687.92	3686.82
6	Frank Lukeman (CAN)	904.8	671.70	449	790	860.88	3676.38
7	Gösta Holmér (SWE)	857.2	632.50	618	720	819.52	3647.22
8	Ferdinand Bie (NOR)	785.8	806.45	540	650	819.52	3601.77
9	James Donahue (USA)	762.0	755.00	487	650	879.68	3533.68
10	Valdemar Wickholm (FIN)	833.4	625.15	629	580	853.36	3520.91
11	Avery Brundage (USA)	666.8	735.40	632	720	744.32	3498.52
12	Karl Halt (GER)	690.6	657.00	632	720	781.92	3481.52
13	Géo André (FRA)	809.6	539.40	510	790	770.64	3419.64
14	Erik Kugelberg (SWE)	643.0	686.40	518	650	725.52	3222.92
15	Josef Schäffer (AUT)	643.0	647.20	670	510	631.52	3101.72
16	Alfredo Pagani (ITA)	619.2	595.75	487	650	710.48	3062.43
17	Alfreds Alslebens (RUS)	666.8	703.55	368	720	601.44	3059.79
18	Aleksandr Schultz (RUS)	643.0	576.15	528	510	766.88	3024.03
19	Einar Nilsson (SWE)	833.4	568.80	803	720	0	DNF 2925.20
20	Otto Röhr (GER)	881.0	742.75	501	720	0	DNF 2844.75
21	Skotte Jacobsson (SWE)	952.4	750.10	455	510	0	DNF 2667.50
22	Gunnar Rönström (SWE)	643.0	634.95	589	580	0	DNF 2446.95
23	Alexander Abraham (GER)	714.4	519.80	649	440	0	DNF 2323.20
24	Pierre Failliot (FRA)	881.0	649.65	574	0	0	DNF 2104.65
25	Harry Babcock (USA)	809.6	708.45	536	0	0	DNF 2054.05
26	Svend Langkjær (DEN)	714.4	610.45	506	0	0	DNF 1830.85
27	Viktor Hackberg (SWE)	595.4	549.20	550	0	0	DNF 1694.60
28	Manlio Legat (ITA)	690.6	529.60	343	0	0	DNF 1563.20
29	Mgirdiç Migiryan (TUR)	405.0	497.75	625	0	0	DNF 1527.75

=== Discus throw ===
Philbrook scored over 1000 points in the event by breaking the previous Olympic record (listed as 41.46 metres in the 1912 official report, though actually only 40.89 set by Martin Sheridan in 1908). Since the discus throw event had been held 2 days prior to the decathlon and Armas Taipale had far exceeded the old record, Philbrook's mark was not a new record. It did vault him from 5th place to 2nd following the 6th event, however.

Event 6
Place	Athlete	Distance	Score
1	George Philbrook (USA)	41.56	1038.00
2	Josef Schäffer (AUT)	37.14	835.84
3	Jim Thorpe (USA)	36.98	829.76
4	Hugo Wieslander (SWE)	36.29	803.54
5	Karl Halt (GER)	35.46	772.00
6	Charles Lomberg (SWE)	35.35	767.82
7	Avery Brundage (USA)	34.07	719.28
8	Gösta Holmér (SWE)	31.78	632.16
9	Ferdinand Bie (NOR)	31.65	627.22
10	Erik Kugelberg (SWE)	31.48	620.76
11	Aleksandr Schultz (RUS)	31.34	615.44
12	Frank Lukeman (CAN)	30.52	584.28
13	Alfredo Pagani (ITA)	30.20	572.12
14	James Donahue (USA)	29.95	562.62
15	Valdemar Wickholm (FIN)	29.78	556.16
16	Alfreds Alslebens (RUS)	29.21	534.50
17	Géo André (FRA)	25.37	388.56
18	Eugene Mercer (USA)	21.95	258.62
—	Einar Nilsson (SWE)	DNS	0
—	Otto Röhr (GER)	DNS	0
—	Skotte Jacobsson (SWE)	DNS	0
—	Gunnar Rönström (SWE)	DNS	0
—	Alexander Abraham (GER)	DNS	0
—	Pierre Failliot (FRA)	DNS	0
—	Harry Babcock (USA)	DNS	0
—	Svend Langkjær (DEN)	DNS	0
—	Viktor Hackberg (SWE)	DNS	0
—	Manlio Legat (ITA)	DNS	0
—	Mgirdiç Migiryan (TUR)	DNS	0

After 6 events
Place	Athlete	1	2	3	4	5	6	Total
1	Jim Thorpe (USA)	904.8	830.95	809	958	857.12	829.76	5189.63
2	George Philbrook (USA)	619.2	720.70	799	860	687.92	1038.00	4724.82
3	Charles Lomberg (SWE)	762.0	850.55	687	860	751.84	767.82	4679.21
4	Hugo Wieslander (SWE)	762.0	740.30	734	790	804.48	803.54	4634.32
5	Gösta Holmér (SWE)	857.2	632.50	618	720	819.52	632.16	4279.38
6	Frank Lukeman (CAN)	904.8	671.70	449	790	860.88	584.28	4260.66
7	Karl Halt (GER)	690.6	657.00	632	720	781.92	772.00	4253.52
8	Ferdinand Bie (NOR)	785.8	806.45	540	650	819.52	627.22	4228.99
9	Avery Brundage (USA)	666.8	735.40	632	720	744.32	719.28	4217.80
10	Eugene Mercer (USA)	952.4	843.20	496	650	943.60	258.62	4143.82
11	James Donahue (USA)	762.0	755.00	487	650	879.68	562.62	4096.30
12	Valdemar Wickholm (FIN)	833.4	625.15	629	580	853.36	556.16	4077.07
13	Josef Schäffer (AUT)	643.0	647.20	670	510	631.52	835.84	3937.56
14	Erik Kugelberg (SWE)	643.0	686.40	518	650	725.52	620.76	3843.68
15	Géo André (FRA)	809.6	539.40	510	790	770.64	388.56	3808.20
16	Aleksandr Schultz (RUS)	643.0	576.15	528	510	766.88	615.44	3639.47
17	Alfredo Pagani (ITA)	619.2	595.75	487	650	710.48	572.12	3634.55
18	Alfreds Alslebens (RUS)	666.8	703.55	368	720	601.44	534.50	3594.29
19	Einar Nilsson (SWE)	833.4	568.80	803	720	0	0	DNF 2925.20
20	Otto Röhr (GER)	881.0	742.75	501	720	0	0	DNF 2844.75
21	Skotte Jacobsson (SWE)	952.4	750.10	455	510	0	0	DNF 2667.50
22	Gunnar Rönström (SWE)	643.0	634.95	589	580	0	0	DNF 2446.95
23	Alexander Abraham (GER)	714.4	519.80	649	440	0	0	DNF 2323.20
24	Pierre Failliot (FRA)	881.0	649.65	574	0	0	0	DNF 2104.65
25	Harry Babcock (USA)	809.6	708.45	536	0	0	0	DNF 2054.05
26	Svend Langkjær (DEN)	714.4	610.45	506	0	0	0	DNF 1830.85
27	Viktor Hackberg (SWE)	595.4	549.20	550	0	0	0	DNF 1694.60
28	Manlio Legat (ITA)	690.6	529.60	343	0	0	0	DNF 1563.20
29	Mgirdiç Migiryan (TUR)	405.0	497.75	625	0	0	0	DNF 1527.75

=== 110 metre hurdles ===
Event 7
Place	Athlete	Time	Score
1	Jim Thorpe (USA)	15.6	943.0
2	James Donahue (USA)	16.2	886.0
3	Frank Lukeman (CAN)	16.3	876.5
4	Géo André (FRA)	16.4	867.0
4	Ferdinand Bie (NOR)	16.4	867.0
4	Eugene Mercer (USA)	16.4	867.0
7	George Philbrook (USA)	16.8	829.0
8	Gösta Holmér (SWE)	17.0	810.0
8	Valdemar Wickholm (FIN)	17.0	810.0
10	Avery Brundage (USA)	17.1	800.5
11	Erik Kugelberg (SWE)	17.2	791.0
11	Alfredo Pagani (ITA)	17.2	791.0
11	Hugo Wieslander (SWE)	17.2	791.0
14	Charles Lomberg (SWE)	17.6	753.0
15	Karl Halt (GER)	17.7	743.5
16	Aleksandr Schultz (RUS)	17.8	734.0
17	Josef Schäffer (AUT)	18.9	629.5
18	Alfreds Alslebens (RUS)	19.5	572.5
—	Einar Nilsson (SWE)	DNS	000.0
—	Otto Röhr (GER)	DNS	000.0
—	Skotte Jacobsson (SWE)	DNS	000.0
—	Gunnar Rönström (SWE)	DNS	000.0
—	Alexander Abraham (GER)	DNS	000.0
—	Pierre Failliot (FRA)	DNS	000.0
—	Harry Babcock (USA)	DNS	000.0
—	Svend Langkjær (DEN)	DNS	000.0
—	Viktor Hackberg (SWE)	DNS	000.0
—	Manlio Legat (ITA)	DNS	000.0
—	Mgirdiç Migiryan (TUR)	DNS	000.0

After 7 events
Place	Athlete	1	2	3	4	5	6	7	Total
1	Jim Thorpe (USA)	904.8	830.95	809	958	857.12	829.76	943.0	6132.63
2	George Philbrook (USA)	619.2	720.70	799	860	687.92	1038.00	829.0	5553.82
3	Charles Lomberg (SWE)	762.0	850.55	687	860	751.84	767.82	753.0	5432.21
4	Hugo Wieslander (SWE)	762.0	740.30	734	790	804.48	803.54	791.0	5425.32
5	Frank Lukeman (CAN)	904.8	671.70	449	790	860.88	584.28	876.5	5137.16
6	Ferdinand Bie (NOR)	785.8	806.45	540	650	819.52	627.22	867.0	5095.99
7	Gösta Holmér (SWE)	857.2	632.50	618	720	819.52	632.16	810.0	5089.38
8	Avery Brundage (USA)	666.8	735.40	632	720	744.32	719.28	800.5	5018.30
9	Eugene Mercer (USA)	952.4	843.20	496	650	943.60	258.62	867.0	5010.82
10	Karl Halt (GER)	690.6	657.00	632	720	781.92	772.00	743.5	4997.02
11	James Donahue (USA)	762.0	755.00	487	650	879.68	562.62	886.0	4982.30
12	Valdemar Wickholm (FIN)	833.4	625.15	629	580	853.36	556.16	810.0	4887.07
13	Géo André (FRA)	809.6	539.40	510	790	770.64	388.56	867.0	4675.20
14	Erik Kugelberg (SWE)	643.0	686.40	518	650	725.52	620.76	791.0	4634.68
15	Josef Schäffer (AUT)	643.0	647.20	670	510	631.52	835.84	629.5	4567.06
16	Alfredo Pagani (ITA)	619.2	595.75	487	650	710.48	572.12	791.0	4425.55
17	Aleksandr Schultz (RUS)	643.0	576.15	528	510	766.88	615.44	734.0	4373.47
18	Alfreds Alslebens (RUS)	666.8	703.55	368	720	601.44	534.50	572.5	4166.79
19	Einar Nilsson (SWE)	833.4	568.80	803	720	0	0	0	DNF 2925.20
20	Otto Röhr (GER)	881.0	742.75	501	720	0	0	0	DNF 2844.75
21	Skotte Jacobsson (SWE)	952.4	750.10	455	510	0	0	0	DNF 2667.50
22	Gunnar Rönström (SWE)	643.0	634.95	589	580	0	0	0	DNF 2446.95
23	Alexander Abraham (GER)	714.4	519.80	649	440	0	0	0	DNF 2323.20
24	Pierre Failliot (FRA)	881.0	649.65	574	0	0	0	0	DNF 2104.65
25	Harry Babcock (USA)	809.6	708.45	536	0	0	0	0	DNF 2054.05
26	Svend Langkjær (DEN)	714.4	610.45	506	0	0	0	0	DNF 1830.85
27	Viktor Hackberg (SWE)	595.4	549.20	550	0	0	0	0	DNF 1694.60
28	Manlio Legat (ITA)	690.6	529.60	343	0	0	0	0	DNF 1563.20
29	Mgirdiç Migiryan (TUR)	405.0	497.75	625	0	0	0	0	DNF 1527.75

=== Pole vault ===
Two more athletes dropped out, leaving 16 left out of the original 29.

Event 8
Place	Athlete	Height	Score
1	Eugene Mercer (USA)	3.60	940.6
2	James Donahue (USA)	3.40	832.6
3	Charles Lomberg (SWE)	3.25	751.6
3	Josef Schäffer (AUT)	3.25	751.6
3	Jim Thorpe (USA)	3.25	751.6
3	Valdemar Wickholm (FIN)	3.25	751.6
7	Gösta Holmér (SWE)	3.20	724.6
8	Hugo Wieslander (SWE)	3.10	670.6
9	Erik Kugelberg (SWE)	3.00	616.6
10	Ferdinand Bie (NOR)	2.90	562.6
10	Avery Brundage (USA)	2.90	562.6
12	Karl Halt (GER)	2.70	454.6
12	Frank Lukeman (CAN)	2.70	454.6
12	Aleksandr Schultz (RUS)	2.70	454.6
15	George Philbrook (USA)	2.50	346.6
16	Alfreds Alslebens (RUS)	0.00	0
—	Géo André (FRA)	DNS	0
—	Alfredo Pagani (ITA)	DNS	0
—	Einar Nilsson (SWE)	DNS	0
—	Otto Röhr (GER)	DNS	0
—	Skotte Jacobsson (SWE)	DNS	0
—	Gunnar Rönström (SWE)	DNS	0
—	Alexander Abraham (GER)	DNS	0
—	Pierre Failliot (FRA)	DNS	0
—	Harry Babcock (USA)	DNS	0
—	Svend Langkjær (DEN)	DNS	0
—	Viktor Hackberg (SWE)	DNS	0
—	Manlio Legat (ITA)	DNS	0
—	Mgirdiç Migiryan (TUR)	DNS	0

After 8 events
Place	Athlete	1	2	3	4	5	6	7	8	Total
1	Jim Thorpe (USA)	904.8	830.95	809	958	857.12	829.76	943.0	751.6	6884.23
2	Charles Lomberg (SWE)	762.0	850.55	687	860	751.84	767.82	753.0	751.6	6183.81
3	Hugo Wieslander (SWE)	762.0	740.30	734	790	804.48	803.54	791.0	670.6	6095.92
4	Eugene Mercer (USA)	952.4	843.20	496	650	943.60	258.62	867.0	940.6	5951.42
5	George Philbrook (USA)	619.2	720.70	799	860	687.92	1038.00	829.0	346.6	5900.42
6	James Donahue (USA)	762.0	755.00	487	650	879.68	562.62	886.0	832.6	5814.90
7	Gösta Holmér (SWE)	857.2	632.50	618	720	819.52	632.16	810.0	724.6	5813.98
8	Ferdinand Bie (NOR)	785.8	806.45	540	650	819.52	627.22	867.0	562.6	5658.59
9	Valdemar Wickholm (FIN)	833.4	625.15	629	580	853.36	556.16	810.0	751.6	5638.67
10	Frank Lukeman (CAN)	904.8	671.70	449	790	860.88	584.28	876.5	454.6	5591.76
11	Avery Brundage (USA)	666.8	735.40	632	720	744.32	719.28	800.5	562.6	5580.90
12	Karl Halt (GER)	690.6	657.00	632	720	781.92	772.00	743.5	454.6	5451.62
13	Josef Schäffer (AUT)	643.0	647.20	670	510	631.52	835.84	629.5	751.6	5318.66
14	Erik Kugelberg (SWE)	643.0	686.40	518	650	725.52	620.76	791.0	616.6	5251.28
15	Aleksandr Schultz (RUS)	643.0	576.15	528	510	766.88	615.44	734.0	454.6	4828.07
16	Alfreds Alslebens (RUS)	666.8	703.55	368	720	601.44	534.50	572.5	0	4166.79
17	Géo André (FRA)	809.6	539.40	510	790	770.64	388.56	867.0	0	DNF 4675.20
18	Alfredo Pagani (ITA)	619.2	595.75	487	650	710.48	572.12	791.0	0	DNF 4425.55
19	Einar Nilsson (SWE)	833.4	568.80	803	720	0	0	0	0	DNF 2925.20
20	Otto Röhr (GER)	881.0	742.75	501	720	0	0	0	0	DNF 2844.75
21	Skotte Jacobsson (SWE)	952.4	750.10	455	510	0	0	0	0	DNF 2667.50
22	Gunnar Rönström (SWE)	643.0	634.95	589	580	0	0	0	0	DNF 2446.95
23	Alexander Abraham (GER)	714.4	519.80	649	440	0	0	0	0	DNF 2323.20
24	Pierre Failliot (FRA)	881.0	649.65	574	0	0	0	0	0	DNF 2104.65
25	Harry Babcock (USA)	809.6	708.45	536	0	0	0	0	0	DNF 2054.05
26	Svend Langkjær (DEN)	714.4	610.45	506	0	0	0	0	0	DNF 1830.85
27	Viktor Hackberg (SWE)	595.4	549.20	550	0	0	0	0	0	DNF 1694.60
28	Manlio Legat (ITA)	690.6	529.60	343	0	0	0	0	0	DNF 1563.20
29	Mgirdiç Migiryan (TUR)	405.0	497.75	625	0	0	0	0	0	DNF 1527.75

=== Javelin throw ===
Only 14 athletes, fewer than half of the original 29, began the penultimate event.

Event 9
Place	Athlete	Distance	Score
1	Hugo Wieslander (SWE)	50.40	878.175
2	Ferdinand Bie (NOR)	48.52	826.475
3	Gösta Holmér (SWE)	46.28	764.875
4	Jim Thorpe (USA)	45.70	748.925
5	Erik Kugelberg (SWE)	45.67	748.100
6	Valdemar Wickholm (FIN)	42.58	663.125
7	Charles Lomberg (SWE)	41.83	642.500
8	George Philbrook (USA)	41.67	638.100
9	Josef Schäffer (AUT)	41.06	621.325
10	Karl Halt (GER)	39.82	587.225
11	Aleksandr Schultz (RUS)	38.99	564.400
12	Alfreds Alslebens (RUS)	37.34	519.025
13	James Donahue (USA)	37.09	512.150
14	Eugene Mercer (USA)	32.32	380.975
—	Frank Lukeman (CAN)	DNS	0
—	Avery Brundage (USA)	DNS	0
—	Géo André (FRA)	DNS	0
—	Alfredo Pagani (ITA)	DNS	0
—	Einar Nilsson (SWE)	DNS	0
—	Otto Röhr (GER)	DNS	0
—	Skotte Jacobsson (SWE)	DNS	0
—	Gunnar Rönström (SWE)	DNS	0
—	Alexander Abraham (GER)	DNS	0
—	Pierre Failliot (FRA)	DNS	0
—	Harry Babcock (USA)	DNS	0
—	Svend Langkjær (DEN)	DNS	0
—	Viktor Hackberg (SWE)	DNS	0
—	Manlio Legat (ITA)	DNS	0
—	Mgirdiç Migiryan (TUR)	DNS	0

After 9 events
Place	Athlete	1	2	3	4	5	6	7	8	9	Total
1	Jim Thorpe (USA)	904.8	830.95	809	958	857.12	829.76	943.0	751.6	748.925	7633.155
2	Hugo Wieslander (SWE)	762.0	740.30	734	790	804.48	803.54	791.0	670.6	878.175	6974.095
3	Charles Lomberg (SWE)	762.0	850.55	687	860	751.84	767.82	753.0	751.6	642.500	6826.310
4	Gösta Holmér (SWE)	857.2	632.50	618	720	819.52	632.16	810.0	724.6	764.875	6578.855
5	George Philbrook (USA)	619.2	720.70	799	860	687.92	1038.00	829.0	346.6	638.100	6538.520
6	Ferdinand Bie (NOR)	785.8	806.45	540	650	819.52	627.22	867.0	562.6	826.475	6485.065
7	Eugene Mercer (USA)	952.4	843.20	496	650	943.60	258.62	867.0	940.6	380.975	6332.395
8	James Donahue (USA)	762.0	755.00	487	650	879.68	562.62	886.0	832.6	512.150	6327.050
9	Valdemar Wickholm (FIN)	833.4	625.15	629	580	853.36	556.16	810.0	751.6	663.125	6301.795
10	Karl Halt (GER)	690.6	657.00	632	720	781.92	772.00	743.5	454.6	587.225	6038.845
11	Erik Kugelberg (SWE)	643.0	686.40	518	650	725.52	620.76	791.0	616.6	748.100	5999.380
12	Josef Schäffer (AUT)	643.0	647.20	670	510	631.52	835.84	629.5	751.6	621.325	5939.985
13	Aleksandr Schultz (RUS)	643.0	576.15	528	510	766.88	615.44	734.0	454.6	564.400	5392.470
14	Alfreds Alslebens (RUS)	666.8	703.55	368	720	601.44	534.50	572.5	0	519.025	4685.815
15	Frank Lukeman (CAN)	904.8	671.70	449	790	860.88	584.28	876.5	454.6	0	DNF 5591.760
16	Avery Brundage (USA)	666.8	735.40	632	720	744.32	719.28	800.5	562.6	0	DNF 5580.900
17	Géo André (FRA)	809.6	539.40	510	790	770.64	388.56	867.0	0	0	DNF 4675.200
18	Alfredo Pagani (ITA)	619.2	595.75	487	650	710.48	572.12	791.0	0	0	DNF 4425.550
19	Einar Nilsson (SWE)	833.4	568.80	803	720	0	0	0	0	0	DNF 2925.200
20	Otto Röhr (GER)	881.0	742.75	501	720	0	0	0	0	0	DNF 2844.750
21	Skotte Jacobsson (SWE)	952.4	750.10	455	510	0	0	0	0	0	DNF 2667.500
22	Gunnar Rönström (SWE)	643.0	634.95	589	580	0	0	0	0	0	DNF 2446.950
23	Alexander Abraham (GER)	714.4	519.80	649	440	0	0	0	0	0	DNF 2323.200
24	Pierre Failliot (FRA)	881.0	649.65	574	0	0	0	0	0	0	DNF 2104.650
25	Harry Babcock (USA)	809.6	708.45	536	0	0	0	0	0	0	DNF 2054.050
26	Svend Langkjær (DEN)	714.4	610.45	506	0	0	0	0	0	0	DNF 1830.850
27	Viktor Hackberg (SWE)	595.4	549.20	550	0	0	0	0	0	0	DNF 1694.600
28	Manlio Legat (ITA)	690.6	529.60	343	0	0	0	0	0	0	DNF 1563.200
29	Mgirdiç Migiryan (TUR)	405.0	497.75	625	0	0	0	0	0	0	DNF 1527.750

=== 1500 metres ===
Event 10
Place	Athlete	Time	Score
1	Jim Thorpe (USA)	4:40.1	779.8
2	Gösta Holmér (SWE)	4:41.9	769.0
3	Erik Kugelberg (SWE)	4:43.5	759.4
4	Valdemar Wickholm (FIN)	4:43.9	757.0
5	James Donahue (USA)	4:44.0	756.4
6	Hugo Wieslander (SWE)	4:45.0	750.4
7	Eugene Mercer (USA)	4:46.3	742.6
8	Aleksandr Schultz (RUS)	4:46.4	742.0
9	Karl Halt (GER)	5:02.8	643.6
10	Josef Schäffer (AUT)	5:05.3	628.6
11	Alfreds Alslebens (RUS)	5:08.6	608.8
12	Charles Lomberg (SWE)	5:12.2	587.2
—	George Philbrook (USA)	DNS	0
—	Ferdinand Bie (NOR)	DNS	0
—	Frank Lukeman (CAN)	DNS	0
—	Avery Brundage (USA)	DNS	0
—	Géo André (FRA)	DNS	0
—	Alfredo Pagani (ITA)	DNS	0
—	Einar Nilsson (SWE)	DNS	0
—	Otto Röhr (GER)	DNS	0
—	Skotte Jacobsson (SWE)	DNS	0
—	Gunnar Rönström (SWE)	DNS	0
—	Alexander Abraham (GER)	DNS	0
—	Pierre Failliot (FRA)	DNS	0
—	Harry Babcock (USA)	DNS	0
—	Svend Langkjær (DEN)	DNS	0
—	Viktor Hackberg (SWE)	DNS	0
—	Manlio Legat (ITA)	DNS	0
—	Mgirdiç Migiryan (TUR)	DNS	0

== Final standings ==
Only 12 of the 29 starters finished the entire decathlon event. Thorpe's disqualification in 1913 and subsequent reinstatement 70 years later resulted in the top four finishers being awarded medals—2 gold, a silver, and a bronze. The IOC's 2022 decision to reinstate Thorpe as sole gold medallist resulted in there being two silver medallists instead of two gold.

Final standings
Place	Athlete	1	2	3	4	5	6	7	8	9	10	Total
Gold	Jim Thorpe (USA)	904.8	830.95	809	958	857.12	829.76	943.0	751.6	748.925	779.8	8412.955
Silver	Hugo Wieslander (SWE)	762.0	740.30	734	790	804.48	803.54	791.0	670.6	878.175	750.4	7724.495
Silver	Charles Lomberg (SWE)	762.0	850.55	687	860	751.84	767.82	753.0	751.6	642.500	587.2	7413.510
Bronze	Gösta Holmér (SWE)	857.2	632.50	618	720	819.52	632.16	810.0	724.6	764.875	769.0	7347.855
4	James Donahue (USA)	762.0	755.00	487	650	879.68	562.62	886.0	832.6	512.150	756.4	7083.450
5	Eugene Mercer (USA)	952.4	843.20	496	650	943.60	258.62	867.0	940.6	380.975	742.6	7074.995
6	Valdemar Wickholm (FIN)	833.4	625.15	629	580	853.36	556.16	810.0	751.6	663.125	757.0	7058.795
7	Erik Kugelberg (SWE)	643.0	686.40	518	650	725.52	620.76	791.0	616.6	748.100	759.4	6758.780
8	Karl Halt (GER)	690.6	657.00	632	720	781.92	772.00	743.5	454.6	587.225	643.6	6682.445
9	Josef Schäffer (AUT)	643.0	647.20	670	510	631.52	835.84	629.5	751.6	621.325	628.6	6568.585
10	Aleksandr Schultz (RUS)	643.0	576.15	528	510	766.88	615.44	734.0	454.6	564.400	742.0	6134.470
11	Alfreds Alslebens (RUS)	666.8	703.55	368	720	601.44	534.50	572.5	0	519.025	608.8	5294.615
12	George Philbrook (USA)	619.2	720.70	799	860	687.92	1038.00	829.0	346.6	638.100	0	DNF 6538.520
13	Ferdinand Bie (NOR)	785.8	806.45	540	650	819.52	627.22	867.0	562.6	826.475	0	DNF 6485.065
14	Frank Lukeman (CAN)	904.8	671.70	449	790	860.88	584.28	876.5	454.6	0	0	DNF 5591.760
15	Avery Brundage (USA)	666.8	735.40	632	720	744.32	719.28	800.5	562.6	0	0	DNF 5580.900
16	Géo André (FRA)	809.6	539.40	510	790	770.64	388.56	867.0	000.0	0	0	DNF 4675.200
17	Alfredo Pagani (ITA)	619.2	595.75	487	650	710.48	572.12	791.0	0	0	0	DNF 4425.550
18	Einar Nilsson (SWE)	833.4	568.80	803	720	0	0	0	0	0	0	DNF 2925.200
19	Otto Röhr (GER)	881.0	742.75	501	720	0	0	0	0	0	0	DNF 2844.750
20	Skotte Jacobsson (SWE)	952.4	750.10	455	510	0	0	0	0	0	0	DNF 2667.500
21	Gunnar Rönström (SWE)	643.0	634.95	589	580	0	0	0	0	0	0	DNF 2446.950
22	Alexander Abraham (GER)	714.4	519.80	649	440	0	0	0	0	0	0	DNF 2323.200
23	Pierre Failliot (FRA)	881.0	649.65	574	0	0	0	0	0	0	0	DNF 2104.650
24	Harry Babcock (USA)	809.6	708.45	536	0	0	0	0	0	0	0	DNF 2054.050
25	Svend Langkjær (DEN)	714.4	610.45	506	0	0	0	0	0	0	0	DNF 1830.850
26	Viktor Hackberg (SWE)	595.4	549.20	550	0	0	0	0	0	0	0	DNF 1694.600
27	Manlio Legat (ITA)	690.6	529.60	343	0	0	0	0	0	0	0	DNF 1563.200
28	Mgirdiç Migiryan (TUR)	405.0	497.75	625	0	0	0	0	0	0	0	DNF 1527.750

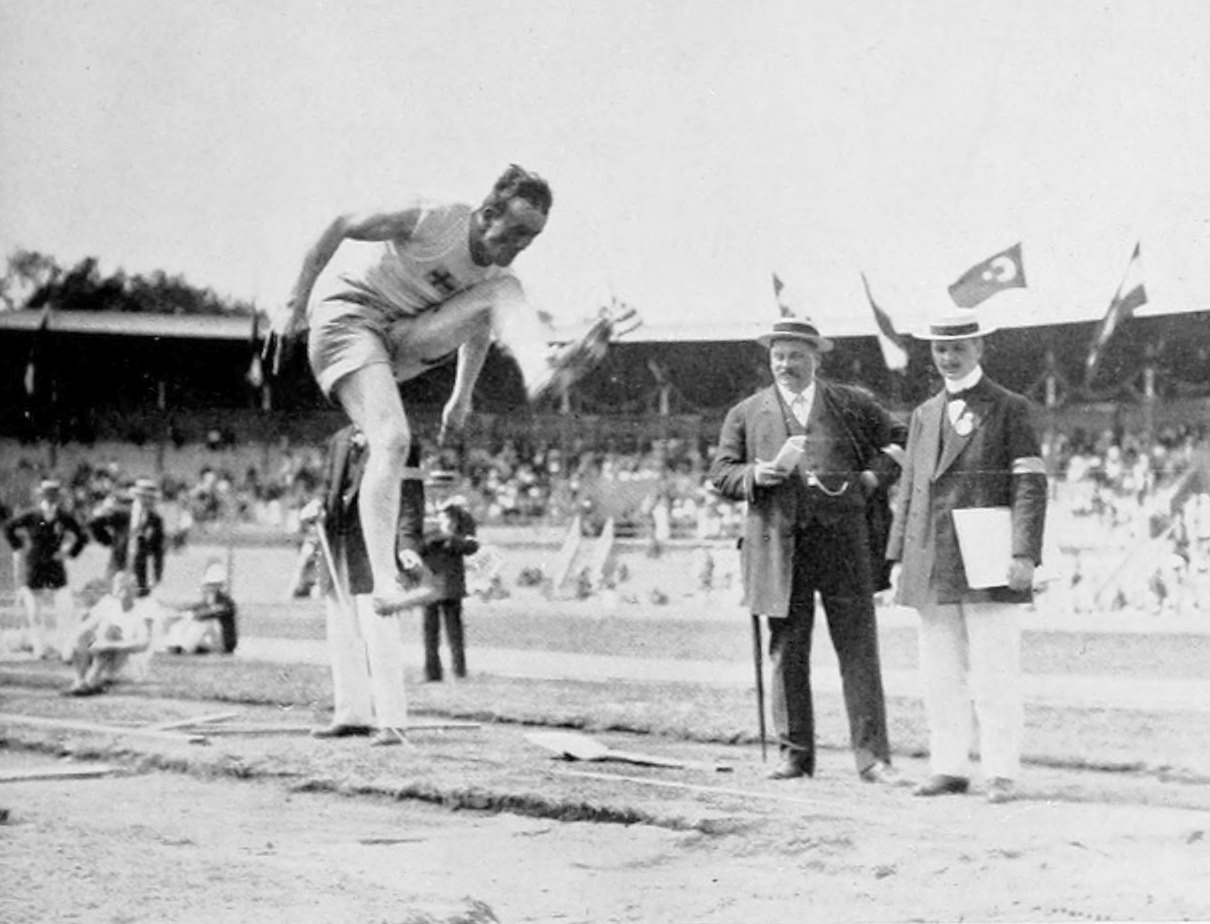
Hugo Wieslander in long jump.

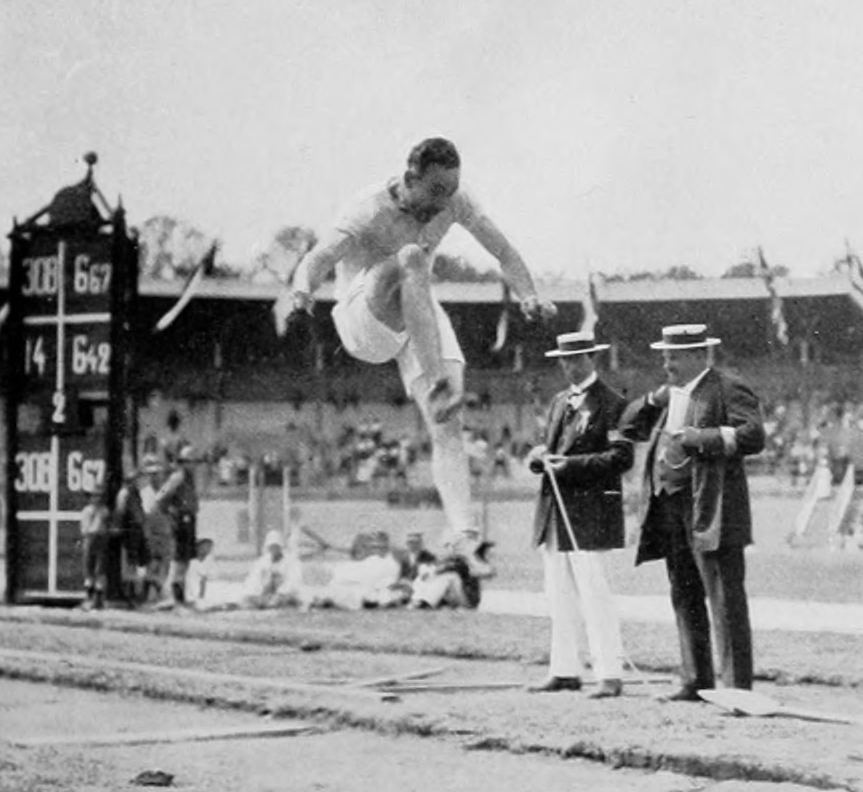
Eugene Mercer in long jump.

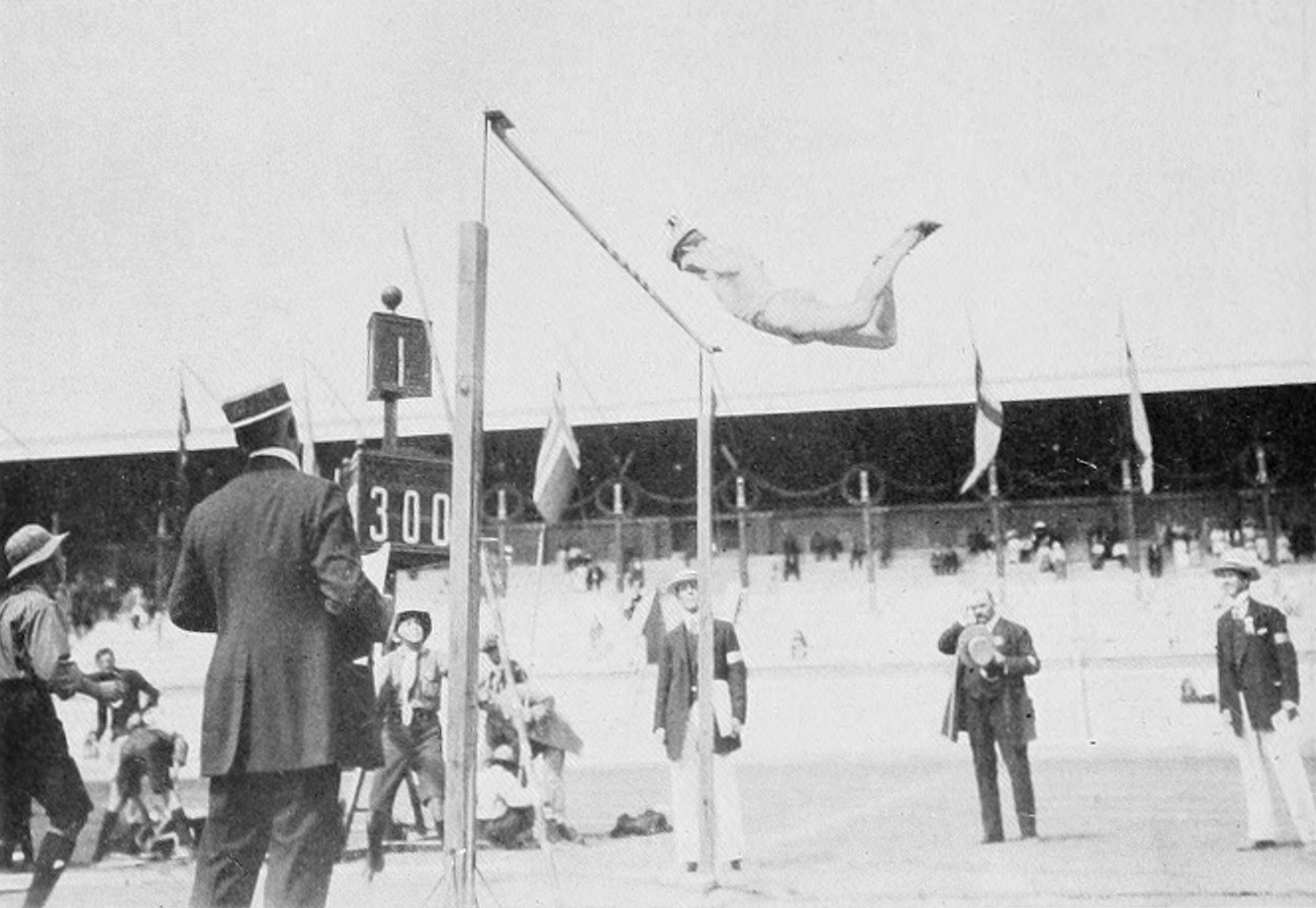
Hugo Wieslander in pole vault.

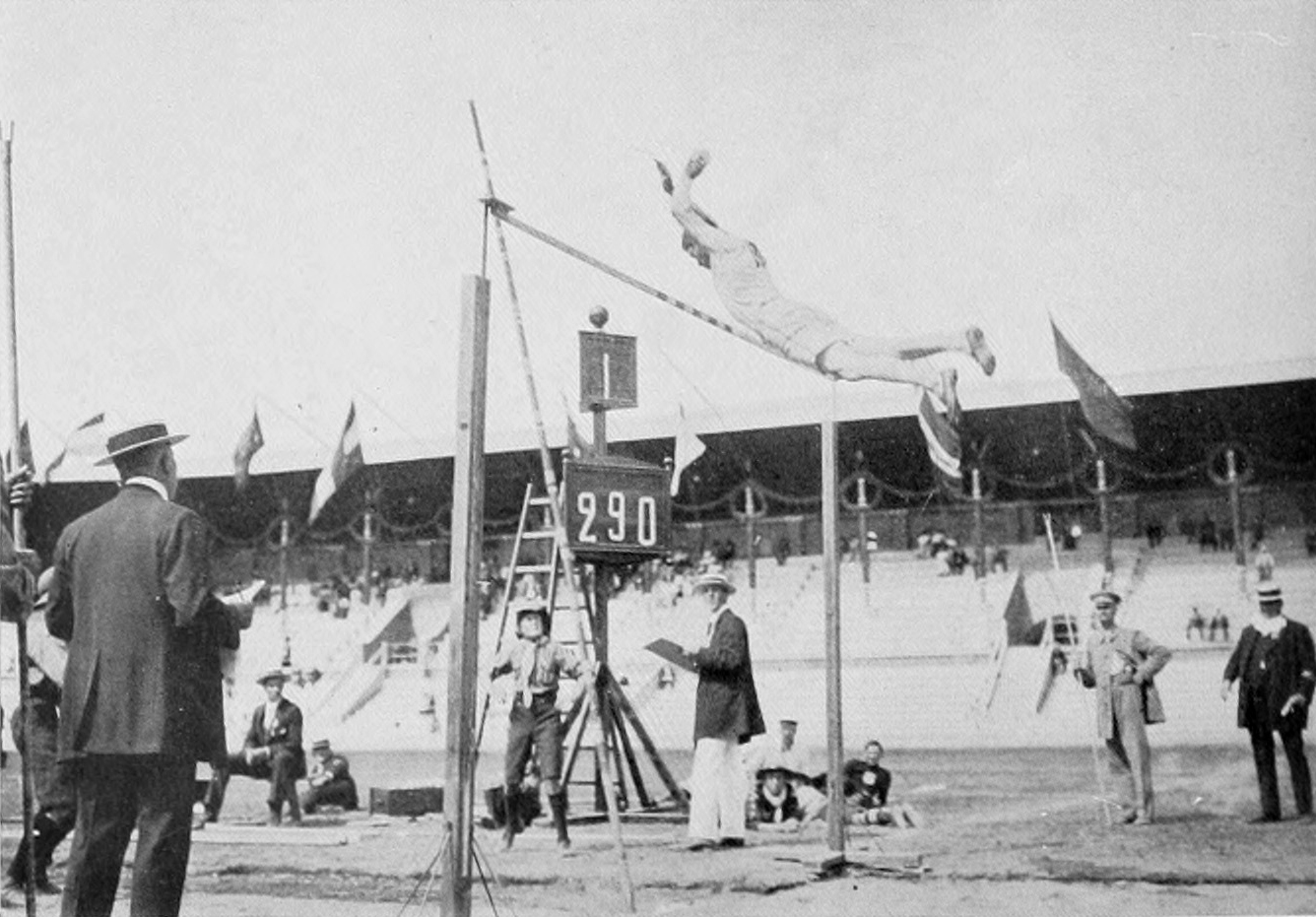
Jim Thorpe in pole vault.
