= Athletics at the 1912 Summer Olympics – Men's high jump =

Men's high jump at the Games of the V Olympiad
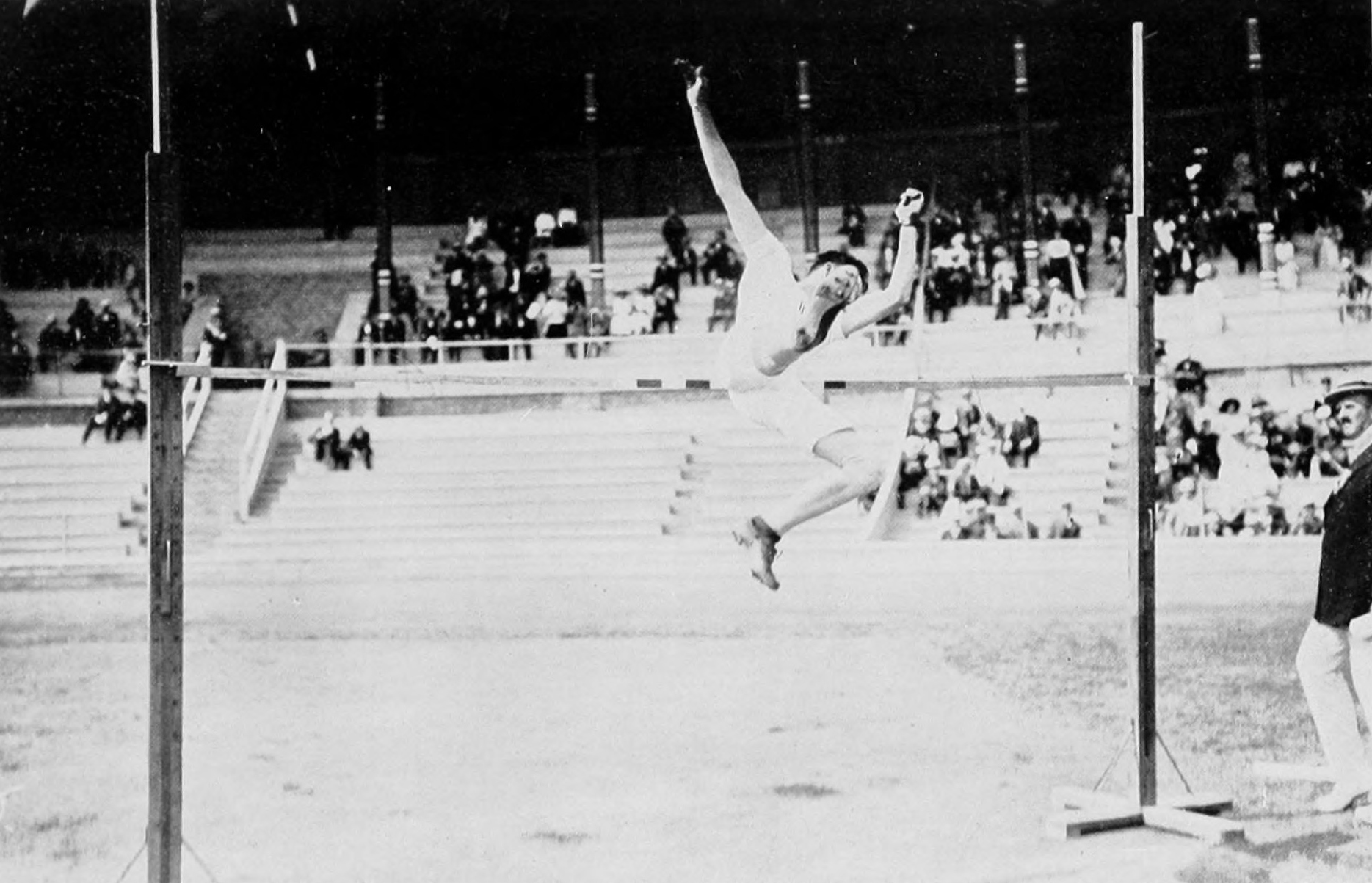
- Richards on the way to win the gold medal.
- Venue: Stockholm Olympic Stadium
- Dates: July 7–8, 1912
- Competitors: 36 from 10 nations
- Winning time: 1.93 OR

Medalists
1st place, gold medalist(s)		Alma Richards; United States
2nd place, silver medalist(s)		Hans Liesche; Germany
3rd place, bronze medalist(s)		George Horine; United States

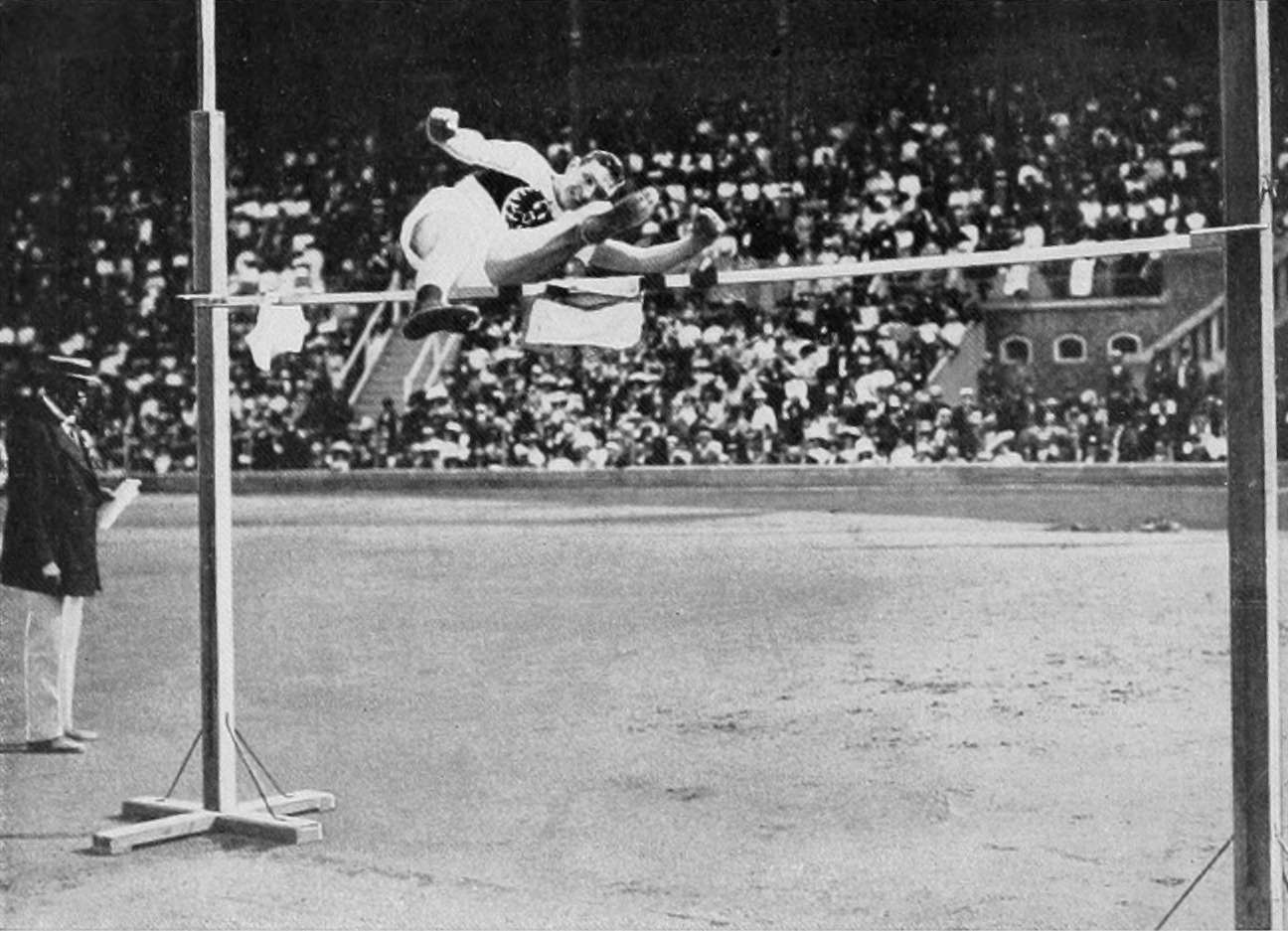
Silver medalist Hans Liesche.

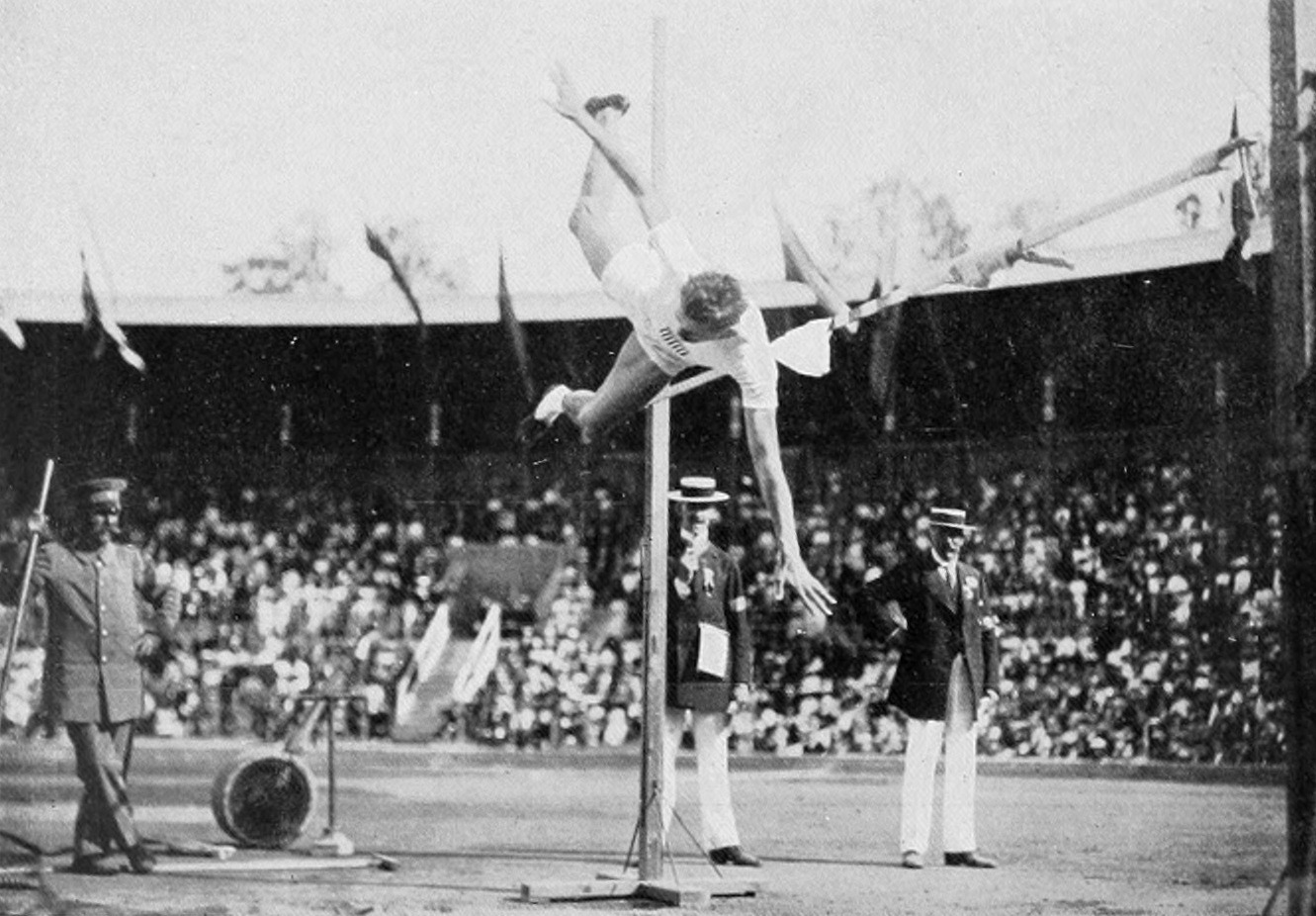
And the bronze medalist George Horine in action.

The men's high jump, also known as the running high jump to distinguish it from the standing high jump, was a track and field athletics event held as part of the Athletics at the 1912 Summer Olympics programme. It was the fifth appearance of the event, which is one of 12 to have been held at every Summer Olympics. The competition was held on July 7, 1912, and on July 8, 1912. Thirty-seven high jumpers from ten nations competed. NOCs could enter up to 12 athletes. The event was won by Alma Richards of the United States, the nation's fifth consecutive victory in the men's high jump. Germany won its second silver medal in the event, after 1904.

== Background ==
This was the fifth appearance of the event, which is one of 12 athletics events to have been held at every Summer Olympics. Returning jumpers from the 1908 Games were silver medalist Géo André of France and Otto Monsen of Norway, who had refused to participate in a re-jump after a successful protest and therefore had no mark in 1908. The Americans were favored, with recent world record breaker George Horine atop a strong (and, as allowed at the time, large) team. Egon Erickson and Alma Richards were also strong contenders; the three men had each won one of the three regional Olympic trials. Jim Thorpe was among the Americans; he won the pentathlon (which did not include a high jump) on the same day as the qualifying round and the decathlon (which did) a week later.

Chile and Italy each made their debut in the event. The United States appeared for the fifth time, having competed at each edition of the Olympic men's high jump to that point.

== Competition format ==
For the first time, there were two distinct rounds of jumping with results cleared between rounds (the 1908 Games had featured a two-round event but the results from the qualifying round then carried over to the final). All jumpers clearing 1.83 metres in the qualifying round advanced to the final.

== Records ==
These were the standing world and Olympic records (in metres) prior to the 1912 Summer Olympics.

World record	George Horine (USA)	2.00	Palo Alto, United States	28 May 1912
Olympic record	Irving Baxter (USA)	1.90	Paris, France	15 July 1900

At first Hans Liesche set a new Olympic record with 1.91 metres. But Alma Richards was able to equalize this mark, when he also jumped 1.91 metres. Finally Alma Richards set a new Olympic record with 1.93 metres.

== Schedule ==
Date	Time	Round
Sunday, 7 July 1912	9:00	Qualifying
Monday, 8 July 1912		Final

== Results ==
Key

- o = Height cleared
- x = Height failed
- – = Height passed
- r = Retired
- SB = Season's best
- PB = Personal best
- NR = National record
- AR = Area record
- OR = Olympic record
- WR = World record
- WL = World lead
- NM = No mark
- DNS = Did not start
- DQ = Disqualified

=== Qualifying ===
Brauer is listed in some sources as having competed and having cleared 1.60 metres (which would put him in the tie for 28th), but other sources make clear he did not start.

Rank	Athlete	Nation	1.60	1.70	1.75	1.80	1.83	Height	Notes
1	Karl-Axel Kullerstrand	Sweden	o	o	o	o	o	1.83	Q
1	Hans Liesche	Germany	o	o	o	o	o	1.83	Q
1	Iván Wardener	Hungary	o	o	o	o	o	1.83	Q
1	Benjamin Howard Baker	Great Britain	xo	o	o	o	o	1.83	Q
1	Harry Grumpelt	United States	o	o	xo	o	o	1.83	Q
1	Egon Erickson	United States	o	o	o	xo	o	1.83	Q
1	Alma Richards	United States	o	o	o	xo	o	1.83	Q
1	George Horine	United States	o	o	o	o	xo	1.83	Q
1	Timothy Carroll	Great Britain	xo	o	xxo	o	xo	1.83	Q
1	John Johnstone	United States	–	o	o	xo	xo	1.83	Q
1	Jim Thorpe	United States	o	o	xo	o	xxo	1.83	Q
12	Jervis Burdick	United States	o	o	o	xo	xxx	1.80	
13	Wesley Oler	United States	o	o	o	xxx	—N/a	1.75	
13	Richard Sjöberg	Sweden	o	o	o	xxx	—N/a	1.75	
13	Arvo Laine	Finland	o	xo	o	xxx	—N/a	1.75	
13	Harold Enright	United States	o	o	xo	xxx	—N/a	1.75	
13	Gösta Hallberg	Sweden	x	o	xo	xxx	—N/a	1.75	
13	Otto Monsen	Norway	–	xo	xo	xxx	—N/a	1.75	
13	Gerhard Olsen	Norway	–	xo	xxo	xxx	—N/a	1.75	
13	Ole Aarnæs	Norway	o	xo	xxo	xxx	—N/a	1.75	
13	André Labat	France	o	xo	xxo	xxx	—N/a	1.75	
13	Otto Röhr	Germany	o	xo	xxo	xxx	—N/a	1.75	
23	Thomas O'Donahue	Great Britain	–	o	–	—N/a		1.70	
23	Platt Adams	United States	o	o	–	—N/a		1.70	
23	Géo André	France	xo	xo	xxx	—N/a		1.70	
23	Paulus af Uhr	Sweden	x	xo	xxx	—N/a		1.70	
23	Ragnar Mattson	Sweden	x	xo	xxx	—N/a		1.70	
28	Rodolfo Hammersley	Chile	o	x	—N/a			1.60	
28	Gustaf Holmér	Sweden	o	x	—N/a			1.60	
28	Lajos Ludinszky	Hungary	o	x	—N/a			1.60	
28	Michel Meerz	France	o	x	—N/a			1.60	
28	Alfredo Pagani	Italy	o	xxx	—N/a			1.60	
33	Marius Delaby	France	–	x	—N/a			No mark	
33	Armand Estang	France	–	x	—N/a			No mark	
33	John Nicholson	United States	–	xxx	—N/a			No mark	
33	Angelo Tonini	Italy	x	xxx	—N/a			No mark	
—	Tage Brauer	Sweden	DNS						

=== Final ===
Rank	Athlete	Nation	1.60	1.70	1.75	1.80	1.83	1.85	1.87	1.89	1.91	1.93	Height	Notes
1st place, gold medalist(s)	Alma Richards	United States	o	o	o	xo	xxo	xo	xxo	xxo	xxo	o	1.93	OR
2nd place, silver medalist(s)	Hans Liesche	Germany	o	o	o	o	o	o	o	xo	xo	xxx	1.91	
3rd place, bronze medalist(s)	George Horine	United States	o	o	o	o	xo	o	o	xo	xxx	—N/a	1.89	
4	Jim Thorpe	United States	xo	o	o	o	o	o	o	xxx	—N/a		1.87	
4	Egon Erickson	United States	o	o	o	o	o	xo	xo	xxx	—N/a		1.87	
6	John Johnstone	United States	o	o	o	o	xxo	xo	xxx	—N/a			1.85	
6	Harry Grumpelt	United States	o	o	o	xo	o	xxo	xxx	—N/a			1.85	
8	Karl-Axel Kullerstrand	Sweden	o	o	o	xo	o	xxx	—N/a				1.83	
9	Timothy Carroll	Great Britain	o	o	o	xo	xxx	—N/a					1.80	
9	Iván Wardener	Hungary	o	o	o	xo	xxx	—N/a					1.80	
11	Benjamin Howard Baker	Great Britain	o	o	o	xxx	—N/a						1.75	

== Sources ==
- Bergvall, Erik, ed. (1913). The Official Report of the Olympic Games of Stockholm 1912. Translated by Adams-Ray, Edward. Stockholm: Wahlström & Widstrand.
- Wudarski, Pawel (1999). "Wyniki Igrzysk Olimpijskich" (in Polish).
