= Wickholm =

Wickholm is a Norwegian surname. Notable people with the surname include:

- Jani Wickholm (born 1977), Finnish singer
- Truls Wickholm (born 1978), Norwegian politician
- Valdemar Wickholm (1890–1970), Finnish track and field athlete
