= Alexander Abraham =

Alexander Abraham may refer to:

- Alexander Abraham (decathlete) (1886–1971)
- Alexander Abraham (boxer) (born 1981)
- Alex Abraham, composer on RWBY
- 'Quarantine at Alexander Abraham's' in Chronicles of Avonlea
