= Charles Lomberg =

Swedish decathlete

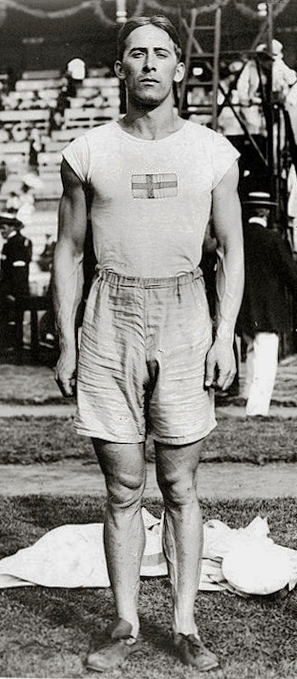
- Lomberg at the 1912 Olympics

Personal information
- Born: 4 December 1886 Gothenburg, Sweden
- Died: 5 March 1966 (aged 79) Gothenburg, Sweden
- Height: 182 cm (6 ft 0 in)
- Weight: 75 kg (165 lb)

Sport
- Sport: Athletics
- Event(s): Long jump, high jump, decathlon
- Club: IS Lyckans Soldater, Göteborg

Achievements and titles
- Personal best(s): LJ – 6.87 m (1912); HJ – 1.82 m (1912); Dec – 5721 (1912)
Medal record
Representing Sweden
Olympic Games
Silver medal – second place	1912 Stockholm	Decathlon

Charles Georg Lomberg (4 December 1886 – 5 March 1966) was a Swedish decathlete. He competed at the 1912 Summer Olympics in the long jump, pentathlon and decathlon and finished in 17th, 16th and third place, respectively. He was awarded a silver medal in the decathlon after the disqualification of Jim Thorpe. In 1982, Thorpe was reinstated as the champion, yet Lomberg retained his second position and silver medal.

Lomberg won the 1912 Swedish decathlon title, beating Hugo Wieslander, but lost to Wieslander at the 1912 Olympics. He actively competed only in 1911–1912 and tried to qualify for the 1920 Games but failed.
