= Josef Schäffer =

Austrian athlete

Josef Schäffer (born July 2, 1891 in Moravia) was an Austrian track and field athlete who competed in the 1912 Summer Olympics.

== Career ==
He was the Austrian champion in pole vault in 1914, shot put in 1911, and decathlon in 1913.

He competed in the decathlon, shot put, discus throw and two-handed discus throw at the 1912 Summer Olympics, his first Olympics. He finished tenth in the decathlon, throwing the second-furthest in the discus on his way to his score of 6568.585. In the shot put, he finished thirteenth. In the discus throw, he only managed to come twenty-ninth in the regular discus throw but came sixteenth in the two-handed discus.

His personal bests achieved were

- SP – 12.80 (1912)
- Decathlon – 5049 (1912)
- DT – 42.09 (1914)

== See also ==
- Austria at the 1912 Summer Olympics
