= Gunnar Rönström =

Swedish athletics competitor

Gunnar Vilhelm Rönström (25 January 1884 – 5 July 1941) was a Swedish track and field athlete who competed in the 1906 Summer Olympics, in the 1908 Summer Olympics and in the 1912 Summer Olympics.

In 1906 he finished fifth in the high jump competition and seventh in the long jump event. He was eliminated in the first round in the 100 metres competition. Two years later he finished tenth in the long jump event.

In 1912 he participated in the decathlon competition but retired after four events.
