= Armand Estang =

French athletics competitor

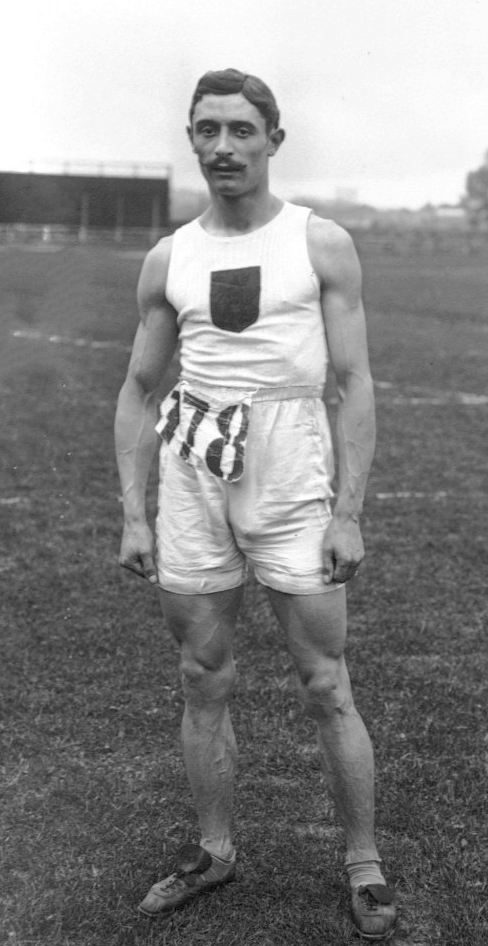
- Estang in 1914

Personal information
- Born: 10 December 1886 Agen, France
- Died: 16 May 1956 (aged 69) Bordeaux, France

Sport
- Sport: Athletics
- Events: High jump, pole vault, hurdles
- Club: Stade Bordelais, Bordeaux

Achievements and titles
- Personal bests: HJ – 1.865 (1919); PV – 3.20 m (1906); 110 mH – 16.2 (1908)

Armand Frédéric Estang (10 December 1886 – 16 May 1956) was a French athlete. He competed in the high jump at the 1912 Summer Olympics, but was unable to clear his starting height of 1.70 m.
