= Jervis Burdick =

American high jumper (1889–1962)

Personal information
- Nationality: American
- Born: March 8, 1889 Philadelphia, Pennsylvania, U.S.
- Died: November 11, 1962 (aged 73) Bryn Mawr, Pennsylvania, U.S.
- Resting place: West Laurel Hill Cemetery, Bala Cynwyd, Pennsylvania, U.S.
- Height: 183 cm (6 ft 0 in)
- Weight: 68 kg (150 lb)

Sport
- Sport: Track and Field
- Event: High jump

Jervis Watson Burdick (born March 8, 1889 - November 11, 1962) was an American track and field athlete who competed in the high jump during the 1912 Summer Olympics.

== Early life and education ==
He was born on March 8, 1889, in Philadelphia, Pennsylvania. He attended the William Penn Charter School. He entered the University of Pennsylvania where he was captain of the track team. He was champion of the intercollegiate high jump event for three years in a row and set national records. He was a member of the Phi Kappa Beta and Psi Upsilon fraternities. He graduated in 1912 with an A.B. degree.

== Olympics ==
In 1912, he was selected as a high jumper on the United States Olympic Team and competed in the Olympics held in Stockholm. He finished twelfth in the high jump competition.

He lived in Ardmore, Pennsylvania, and worked as a broker in the coal business for thirty-five years. He was admitted to the University of Pennsylvania Hall of Fame.

He died on November 11, 1962, in Bryn Mawr, Pennsylvania, and was interred at West Laurel Hill Cemetery in Bala Cynwyd, Pennsylvania.
