= Alfrēds Alslēbens =

Latvian athletics competitor

Alfrēds Alslēbens (12 July 1892 – 26 November 1930) was a Latvian track and field athlete who competed in the 1912 Summer Olympics for the Russian Empire. He was born in Rīga, Russian Empire. He competed in the decathlon. He finished twelfth and last out of those who finished, whittled down from the twenty-nine athletes who began the event.

== See also ==
- Russia at the 1912 Summer Olympics

== Sources ==
- Evans, Hilary; Gjerde, Arild; Heijmans, Jeroen; Mallon, Bill; et al. "Alfreds Alslēbens". Olympics at Sports-Reference.com. Sports Reference LLC. Archived from the original on 2020-04-17.
- Mention of Alfreds Alslebens' death (in Latvian)
