= Gösta Hallberg =

Swedish high jumper

Gösta Hallberg (4 August 1891 – 16 November 1978) was a Swedish athlete who competed in the 1912 Summer Olympics. In 1912 he finished 13th in the high jump competition.
