= Karl-Axel Kullerstrand =

Swedish high jumper

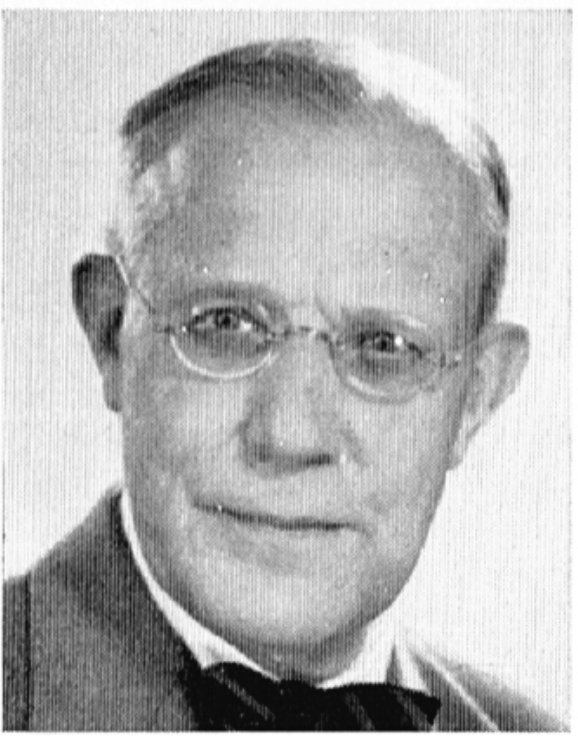
Portrait of Karl Axel

Karl-Axel Kullerstrand (March 1, 1892 – May 14, 1981) was a Swedish track and field athlete who competed in the 1912 Summer Olympics. In 1912, he finished eighth in the high jump competition.
