= Ole Aarnæs =

Norwegian high jumper

Olav "Ole" Augunsen Aarnæs (May 27, 1888 – February 3, 1992) was a Norwegian high jumper.

He participated in the high jump competition at the 1912 Summer Olympics and cleared 1.75 metres but didn't qualify for the final. He never became Norwegian champion.
