= Ragnar Mattson =

Swedish high jumper

Ragnar Mattson (5 January 1892 – 5 December 1965), also Bernlöf, was a Swedish athlete who competed in the 1912 Summer Olympics. In 1912 he finished 23rd in the high jump competition.
