= Egon Erickson =

American track and field athlete

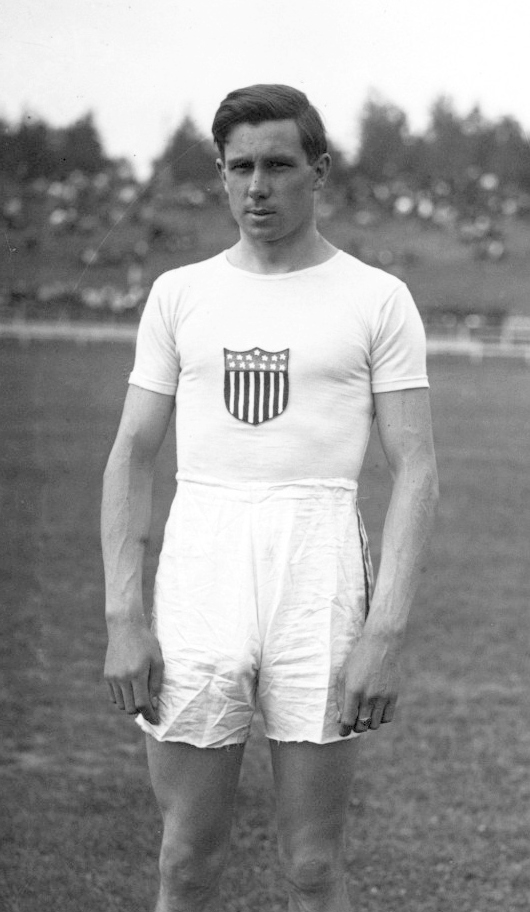
- Egon Erickson in 1912

Personal information
- Born: July 4, 1888 Gothenburg, Sweden
- Died: January 20, 1973 (aged 84) The Bronx, New York, United States
- Height: 1.80 m (5 ft 11 in)
- Weight: 72 kg (159 lb)

Sport
- Sport: Athletics
- Event: High jump
- Club: Mott Haven Athletic Club

Achievements and titles
- Personal best: 1.93 m (1909)

Egon R. Erickson (July 4, 1888 – January 20, 1973) was an American track and field athlete, a member of the Mott Haven Athletic Club, the Irish American Athletic Club and the New York City Police Department from 1911 until his retirement in 1939. At the time of his retirement, Erickson was attached to the Detective Bureau.

Erickson competed in the 1912 Olympic Games in Stockholm, Sweden, in the high jump, tying with Jim Thorpe for the fourth place. He won the AAU title in 1909 (outdoor) and 1912 (indoor) and finished third in 1913 and 1916.
