= Thomas O'Donahue =

Irish athlete

Thomas O'Donohue
Personal information
- Nationality: Irish
- Born: 12 December 1886 Kilmihil, Ireland
- Died: 6 November 1951 (aged 63)

Sport
- Sport: Athletics

Thomas O'Donohue (born 12 December 1887, Kilmihil, Ireland. Died 6 November 1951) was an Irish athlete who competed in the 1912 Summer Olympics for Great Britain and Ireland. He finished 23rd in the high jump competition. In the Olympic trials, he tied for first with Howard Baker.

Thomas worked in Liverpool Customs and Excise. He married D. Molloy from Donegal. During his life, he lived in Leixlip and later Griffith Avenue Dublin. He had six children: four girls and two boys.

His personal best was 1.8m in high jump on 5 November 1912, but he only achieved 1.7m in the 1912 Olympics. His personal best was 6.37m in long jump, achieved on 20 November 1912.
