= Manlio Legat =

Italian athlete

Personal information
- Nationality: Italian
- Born: 30 August 1889 Pianoro
- Died: 17 December 1955 (aged 66)

Sport
- Country: Italy
- Sport: Athletics
- Events: Long jump Pole vault Combined events

Manlio Legat (30 August 1889 – 17 December 1955) was an Italian track and field athlete who competed in the 1912 Summer Olympics in the decathlon, pole vault and long jump. He did not finish the decathlon, after failing to start the high jump, the fourth of the ten events. He finished tied 23rd in pole vault qualifying, and finished 29th in long jump, with the shortest distance recorded.

== See also ==
- Italy at the 1912 Summer Olympics
