= Viktor Hackberg =

Swedish hammer thrower

Viktor Engelbrekt Hackberg (August 13, 1891 – November 5, 1968) was a Swedish track and field athlete who competed in the 1912 Summer Olympics. In 1912, Hackberg finished 13th in the hammer throw competition. He also participated in the decathlon competition but retired after three events.
