= Skotte Jacobsson =

Swedish athletics competitor

Skotte Jacobsson (24 February 1888 – 8 October 1964) was a Swedish track and field athlete who competed in the 1912 Summer Olympics. During that competition, he finished 17th in the triple jump competition. In the 100 metres event, he was eliminated in the first round, and in the 200 metres event he was eliminated in the semi-finals. In the decathlon competition, he retired after four events.
