= John Johnstone (athlete) =

American high jumper (1892–1969)

John Oliver Johnstone (January 21, 1892 – February, 1969) was an American track and field athlete who competed in the 1912 Summer Olympics where he finished sixth in the high jump competition. He was born in Cambridge, Massachusetts and died in Lancaster, Massachusetts.

John Oliver Johnstone was raised in Brookline, Massachusetts. He was the son of Welsh immigrants James G Johnstone and Bloodwyn Hannah Oliver Johnstone and had one sister, Jenette. He spent much of his youth competing in track and field events throughout New England, attending the Edward Devotion School in Brookline and then going on to Worcester Academy before becoming the youngest member at the time to represent the USA in the Olympics in Stockholm, Sweden.

He was roommates with Jim Thorpe on the SS Finlandia, which took the team to Sweden. He graduated from Worcester Academy, where he attained status as World Schoolboy champion - winning American Athletic Association championships. He graduated from Harvard in 1916 and moved with his wife, Ann Catherine Temple Jones, to Lewiston, Maine, where he was a professor of French and the Track Coach at Bates College.

In December 1921, John and Ann had a daughter, Lywena Temple. By 1924, he became a teacher and coach at Worcester Polytechnic Institute and moved his family to Worcester. He became active in the United Presbyterian Church.

John and Ann's second child, John Oliver Johnstone II, died in infancy. The following year, John Oliver Johnstone III was born healthy and became known as "Jack". They lived in Holden, Massachusetts until 1966 when they retired. After retiring, John became a substitute teacher in the Worcester Public Schools.

He died in February 1969.
