= Iván Wardener =

Hungarian high jumper

Iván Wardener (December 1, 1889 – July 15, 1930) was a track and field athlete who competed for Hungary in the 1912 Summer Olympics. He was born in Solivar-Prešov and died in Miskolc.

In 1912, he finished ninth in the high jump competition.
