= Gerhard Olsen =

Norwegian high jumper (1892–1955)

Gerhard Tomin Olsen (May 27, 1892 – July 1, 1955) was a Norwegian track and field athlete who competed in the 1912 Summer Olympics.

He participated in the high jump competition and cleared 1.75 metres but did not qualify for the final. He finished 13th.
