= Eugene L. Roberts =

American sportsman (1880–1953)

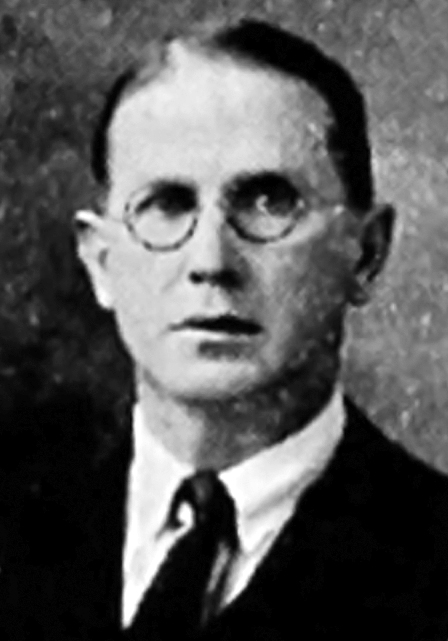
Eugene L. Roberts 1922

Eugene Lusk "Timpanogos" (or "Timp") Roberts (1880–1953) was head of the department of physical education and a coach of sports including track and field at Brigham Young University starting in 1910.

== Early life ==
Roberts was born in Provo. Roberts was the child of William D. Roberts and his wife the former Julia Lusk. The family ran the Hotel Roberts in Provo. He studied at Brigham Young Academy (the predecessor of BYU) from 1898-1904. He also studied at BYU itself receiving at B.A. degree. He then studied at Yale University. He later went to the University of Southern California from which he received a master's degree.

== As a missionary ==
Roberts married Sytha Brown in 1906. A few days later they jointly left to serve an LDS mission. As of 1908 he was serving a mission for the Church of Jesus Christ of Latter-day Saints in Switzerland. It was here, watching the procession of 5000 to worship atop a mountain near Einsiedeln that Roberts conceived the idea of an annual Mount Timpanogos hike, an idea he later implemented while on the BYU faculty, with the first hike occurring in 1912. In fact Roberts was so heavily connected with the mountain, and viewed as a man of such stature, that he was often called "Timpanogos" or "Timp".

== Brigham Young University ==
Roberts was on the BYU faculty and coaching staff from 1910-1928. Around 1912 he was one of the main advocates of the Latter-day Saints adopting the Boy Scouts as an activity organization for the Church and published an article in the Improvement Era that argued for the Church supporting the Boy Scout movement and convinced higher leaders of the Church to do so, including B. H. Roberts who had previously opposed adopting the Boy Scout movement. As of 1912 when he began the annual Mount Timpanogos hikes he was not only the head of physical education at BYU, he was the only member of the faculty who was trained in that discipline. During this time he functioned in part in a way that would later have given him the title athletic director. He oversaw the reintroduction of football at BYU and also named the team the cougars. Among the athletes trained by Roberts were Alma Richards and Clinton Larsen, the latter of whom held the world high jump record from 1917 to 1935.

== Journalism ==
Roberts was also a journalist. He was editor of the BYA newspaper while a student there, and was a sports writer for multiple Salt Lake City papers. It was in this capacity that he introduced references to BYU athletic teams as the cougars. He also wrote correspondence under an assumed name and identity for the Provo Herald to encourage Provo residents to appreciate Mount Timponogos and also clean up trash and beautify the city. When the Herald editors learned that they had been duped into misrepresenting their correspondent, they were not pleased. However instead of exposing Roberts they got him to write a set of moral sermons for them to publish under another assumed name. He is also credited with writing The Legend of Timpanogos.

== University of Southern California ==
He then began coaching at the University of Southern California. He was also a professor teaching courses at USC, and worked with the administration to have John A. Widstoe teach a class on Mormonism, which was the forerunner of the Institute of Religion adjacent to USC.

== Personal life ==
Roberts and his wife Sytha were the parents of eight children, all of whom attended college.

== Legacy ==
One of the peaks of Mount Timpanogos is named Roberts Horn in his honor.

== Sources ==
- L. Tom Perry Special Collections Library bio and material guide for Eugene L. Roberts.
- Ernest L. Wilkinson. Brigham Young University: The First 100 Years. (Provo: BYU Press, 1975) Vol. 1, p. 473.
- BYU Cougar Club bio
- "BYU homecoming opening ceremonies", Church News, October 21, 2009
- BYU Magazine, Summer 2009
