= Hans Liesche =

German high jumper (1891–1979)

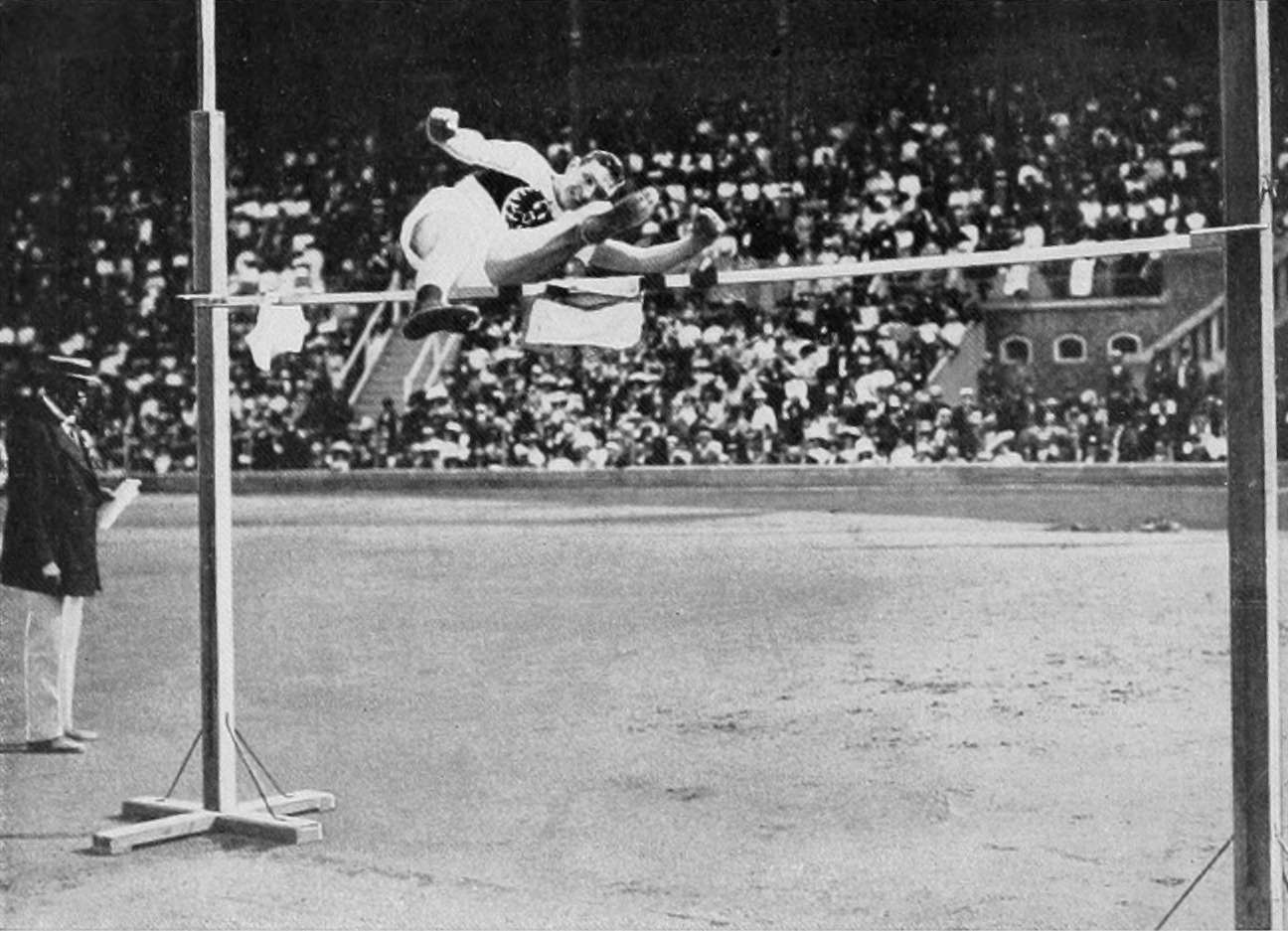
- Liesche at the 1912 Summer Olympics

Medal record

Men's athletics

Representing Germany

Olympic Games
Silver medal – second place	1912 Stockholm	High jump

Hans Liesche (October 11, 1891 – March 30, 1979) was a German athlete, who competed mainly in the high jump. He was born in Hamburg and died in Berlin. Liesche competed for Germany in the 1912 Summer Olympics held in Stockholm, Sweden in the high jump, where he won the silver medal.
