= Erik Kugelberg =

Swedish decathlete (1891–1975)

Erik Kugelberg (9 March 1891 – 15 October 1975) was a Swedish track and field athlete who competed in the 1912 Summer Olympics. In 1912, he finished eighth in the decathlon competition. In the pentathlon competition he retired after three events.
