= Otto Röhr =

German track and field athlete

Franz Hermann Otto Röhr (22 November 1891 – 8 January 1972) was a German track and field athlete who competed in the 1912 Summer Olympics. He was born in Magdeburg and died in Arnsberg.

In 1912, he finished 13th in the high jump competition. He retired after four events in the decathlon competition. He was also a member of the German relay team, which was disqualified in the 4x100 metre relay competition after a fault with its second baton passing.
