= Svend Langkjær =

Danish track and field athlete

Svend Langkjær (23 August 1886 – 2 May 1948) was a Danish track and field athlete who competed in the 1908 and 1912 Summer Olympics. In 1908, he competed in both the standing high jump and the standing long jump, finishing eighth in the high jump with a height of 1.42. In 1912 he competed in the decathlon. He did not finish after failing to start the high jump, the fourth of the ten events.

== See also ==
- Denmark at the 1908 Summer Olympics
- Denmark at the 1912 Summer Olympics
