= Harold Enright =

American high jumper (1890–1946)

Harold Bradfod Enright (April 28, 1890 – March 2, 1946) was an American track and field athlete who competed in the 1912 Summer Olympics. In 1912, he finished 13th in the high jump competition.

A high jumper, Harold Enright finished fourth in the 1911 IC4A and third in 1912. Enright tied for second at the Eastern Olympic Trials in 1912. He competed for Dartmouth, graduating in 1913. A Maine native, Enright moved to the Boston area after college where he worked as a salesman, first for H. F. Staples, and later for the Sherwin-Williams Company.
