= Alma Richards =

American athlete

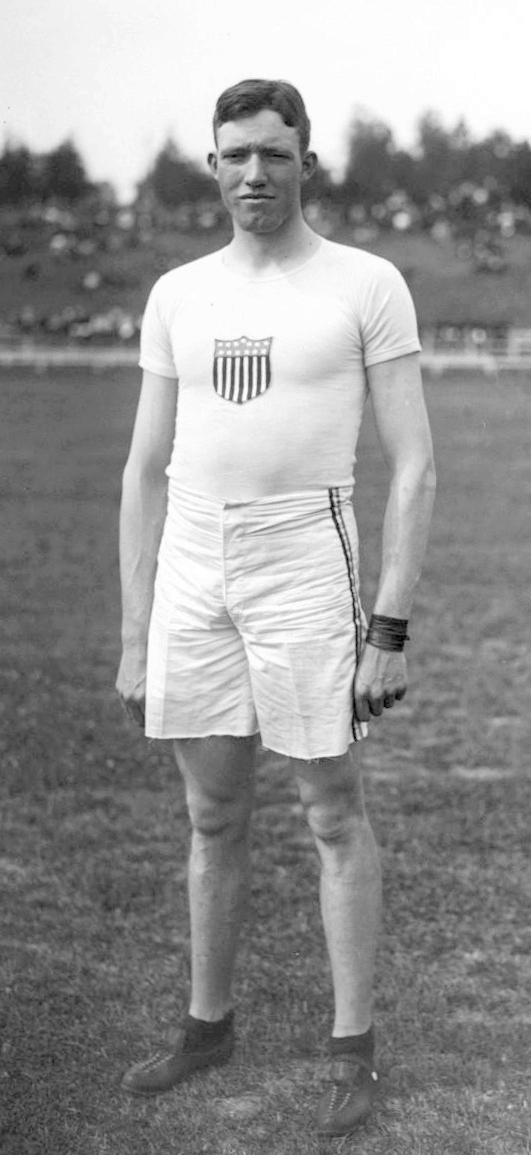
- Richards in 1912

Personal information
- Born: Alma Wilford Richards; February 20, 1890 Parowan, Utah, U.S.
- Died: April 3, 1963 (aged 73) Long Beach, California, U.S.
- Education: Brigham Young High School
- Height: 1.88 m (6 ft 2 in)
- Weight: 84 kg (185 lb)

Sport
- Sport: Track and field
- Events: High jump, long jump, shot put, discus throw, decathlon
- University team: Cornell University Big Red
- Coached by: Eugene L. Roberts

Achievements and titles
- Personal bests: HJ – 1.956 m (1915); LJ – 7.125 m (1915); SP – 14.01 m (1916); DT – 44.12 m (1922)
Medal record
Representing the United States
Olympic Games
Gold medal – first place	1912 Stockholm	High jump

Alma Wilford Richards (February 20, 1890 – April 3, 1963) was an American athlete. He became the first resident of Utah to win an Olympic gold medal, achieving this feat in the running high jump event at the 1912 Summer Olympic Games in Stockholm, Sweden.

== Biography ==
Richards graduated from Brigham Young High School in 1913 and then attended Cornell University with a scholarship, where he was also a member of the Quill and Dagger honor society. He earned a law degree.

He served in the US Army during World War I. He was discharged as a first lieutenant.

Rather than practice law, he chose to teach science at Venice High School in Los Angeles for 32 years. Richards was buried, according to his wishes, in the Parowan Cemetery. He was posthumously inducted into the Utah Sports Hall of Fame (1970), Helms Hall of Fame, and Brigham Young University Hall of Fame.

== Personal life ==
Richards’ first wife was Marian Gardiner Richards. They married in 1918. They had three children: Joanne Richards, Marion Richards, who died in infancy (1924), and Carolyn Richards, who died when she was two years old (1928). His second wife was Gertrude Anita Huntimer Richards. They married in 1932 and had three children: Mary Richards Schraeger of La Habra Heights, California; Anita Richards Ricciardi of Whittier, California; and Paul Richards of Los Angeles, California. His third and final wife was Lenore Catherine Griffin, whom he married in 1948. They did not have any children. Richards was a member of The Church of Jesus Christ of Latter-day Saints, their first member to compete in the Olympics.

A movie, Raising the Bar: The Alma Richards Story was released in April 2025. It was written and directed by LDS filmmaker, T.C. Christensen, who is a grand-nephew of Alma Richards.
