= Alfredo Pagani =

Italian athletics competitor

Personal information
- National team: Italy: 1 cap (1912)
- Born: 8 September 1887 Rome, Italy
- Died: 1984 (aged 96–97)

Sport
- Sport: Athletics
- Events: 110 metres hurdles High jump Long jump Combined events
- Club: Ginnastica Roma (1908)

Achievements and titles
- Personal bests: 110 m hs: 16.6 (1908); High jump: 1.75 (1911)

Alfredo Pagani (6 September 1887 – 1984) was an Italian versatile athlete who competed in five different events at the 1912 Summer Olympics.

== National records ==
- High jump: 1.75 m (Tivoli, Italy 9 July 1911) - record holder until 18 August 1919.

== Achievements ==
Year	Competition	Venue	Position	Event	Performance	Note
1912	Olympic Games	(Sweden) Stockholm	Heat	110 metres hurdles	NM	
1912	Olympic Games	(Sweden) Stockholm	Qual.	Long jump	5.95 m	
1912	Olympic Games	(Sweden) Stockholm	Qual.	High jump	1.60 m	
1912	Olympic Games	(Sweden) Stockholm	24th	Pentathlon	3 events/68 ordinals	
1912	Olympic Games	(Sweden) Stockholm	DNF	Decathlon	NM	

== National titles ==
Pagani won a national championship at individual senior level.

- Italian Athletics Championships
  - 110 m hs: 1912

== See also ==
- Men's high jump Italian record progression
