= Alexander Abraham (decathlete) =

German decathlete and discus thrower

Personal information
- Born: 17 January 1886; Berlin, German Empire
- Died: 5 February 1971 (aged 85); East Berlin, East Germany

Sport
- Sport: Athletics
- Event: shot put / decathlon
- Club: SC Komet Berlin

Alexander Gustav Abraham Steglitz (17 January 1886 – 5 February 1971) was a German track and field athlete, who competed in the 1912 Summer Olympics.

== Biography ==
Abraham was born in Berlin.

Abraham finished third in the shot put event at the British 1911 AAA Championships.

At the 1912 Olympic Games he participated in the decathlon competition but retired after four events. He competed for SC Komet Berlin during his sporting career and later worked as both a sports teacher/lecturer at the Deutscher Sportbund für Athletik as well as a chief coach for skiing and track and field in Turkey from 1928-36.

He died in East Berlin.

== Sources ==
- Evans, Hilary; Gjerde, Arild; Heijmans, Jeroen; Mallon, Bill; et al. "Alexander "Alex" Abraham". Olympics at Sports-Reference.com. Sports Reference LLC. Archived from the original on 17 April 2020.
- list of German athletes
