= Einar Nilsson =

Swedish athlete (1891–1937)

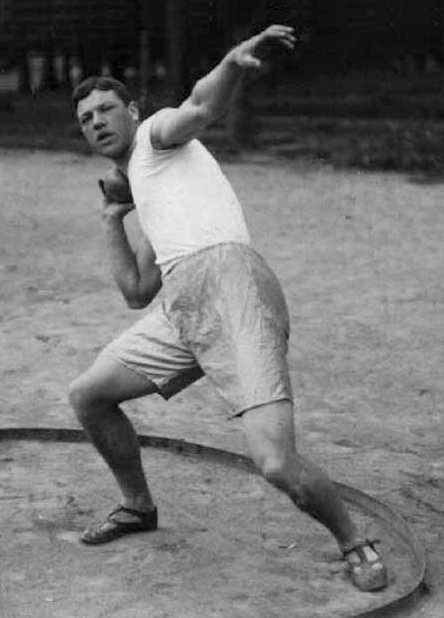

Personal information
- Born: 8 June 1891 Råneå, Sweden
- Died: 22 February 1937 (aged 45) Partille, Sweden
- Height: 190 cm (6 ft 3 in)
- Weight: 92 kg (203 lb)

Sport
- Sport: Athletics
- Events: Shot put, discus throw, javelin throw, decathlon, high jump
- Club: Djurgårdens IF; Örgryte IS, Göteborg

Achievements and titles
- Personal bests: SP – 14.44 m (1913); DT – 42.42 (1914); JT – 47.06 m (1909); Dec – 6586.06* (1911); HJ – 1.80 m (1911)

Einar Nilsson (8 June 1891 – 22 February 1937) was a Swedish track and field athlete who competed in the 1912 and 1920 Summer Olympics.

== Career ==
Nilsson was selected to represent Sweden in his home Olympics in 1912 in Stockholm. He entered the pentathlon, decathlon and two varieties of shot put and discus throw. He failed to complete his decathlon program but placed fourth-tenth in the throwing events. Nilsson held national records in the shot put and discus throw, becoming the first Swede to break the 40 m barrier. He won five national titles in the shot put (1911–1914) and two in the discus (1911 and 1912), and placed second six times.

Nilsson won the British AAA Championships title in the shot put event at the 1913 AAA Championships.

At the 1920 Olympic Games, he qualified only in the shot put and finished fifth.

Nilsson represented Djurgårdens IF and Örgryte IS.
