= Gösta Holmér =

Swedish athletics competitor

Gustaf Holmér
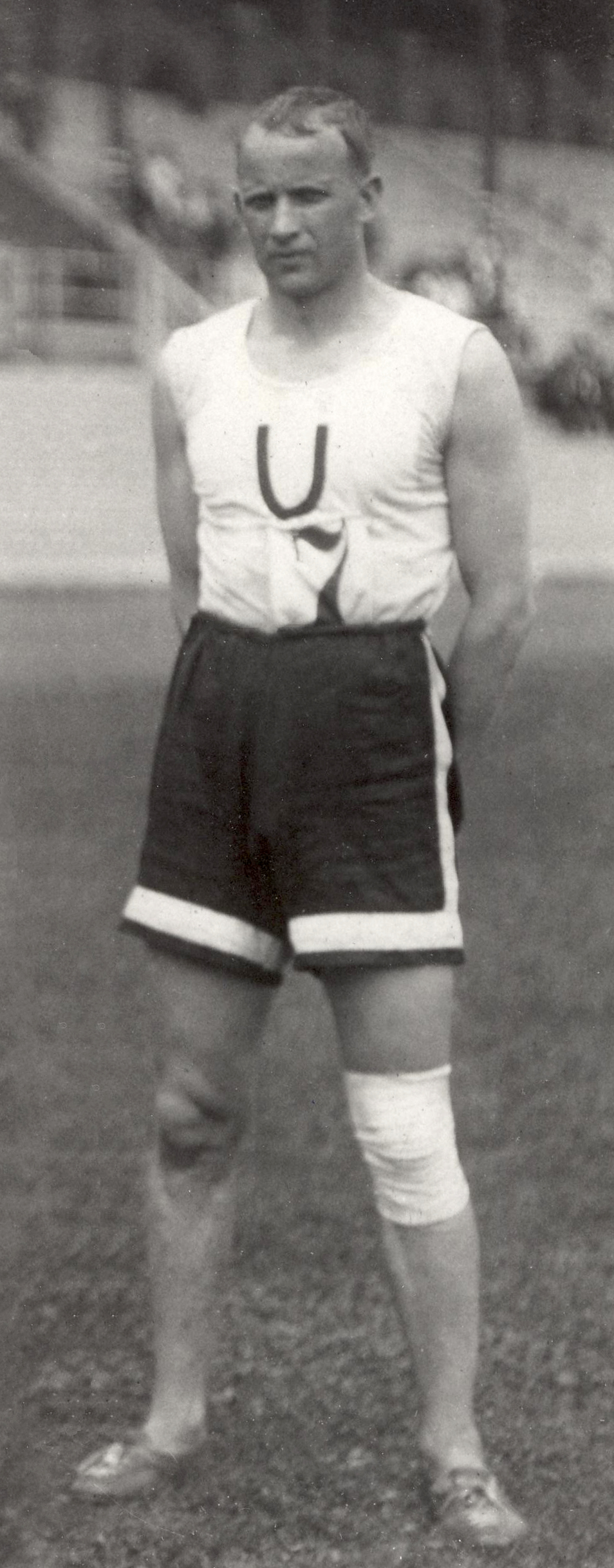
- Gösta Holmér

Personal information
- Full name: Gustaf Richard Mikael Holmér
- Nicknames: Gösse, Gösta
- Born: 23 September 1891 Djursdala, Vimmerby, Sweden
- Died: 22 April 1983 (aged 91) Stockholm, Sweden
- Height: 1.85 m (6 ft 1 in)
- Weight: 84 kg (185 lb)

Sport
- Sport: Athletics
- Event: Decathlon
- Club: Upsala Studenters IF

Achievements and titles
- Personal best(s): 110 mH – 15.8 (1914); HJ – 1.85 m (1917); Decathlon – 5889 (1919)
Medal record
Representing Sweden
Olympic Games
Bronze medal – third place	1912 Stockholm	Decathlon

Gustaf "Gösta" Richard Mikael Holmér (23 September 1891 – 22 April 1983) was a Swedish athlete who competed in the 1912 and 1920 Olympics. In 1912 he won a bronze medal in the decathlon and placed eighth in the pentathlon, despite not running the 1500 m stage. In 1920, he placed fourth in the decathlon and was eliminated in the first round of the 110 m hurdles event. Nationally, Holmér won Swedish titles in the pentathlon (1912–13, 1915, 1917 and 1920), decathlon (1913 and 1917–19) and 110 m hurdles (1913).

In the 1912 Olympic decathlon, Holmér finished fourth but was awarded a bronze medal after the winner Jim Thorpe was disqualified for having played semi-professional baseball. Thorpe was reinstated as a winner in 1982, and Holmér was moved down to the fourth place, yet he retained a bronze medal.

In the 1930s, while coaching the downtrodden Swedish cross-country team, Holmér developed the fartlek interval training technique. His concept was faster-than-race-pace and concentrated on simultaneous speed/endurance training. The technique proved successful and has been adopted by many physiologists since then.

Holmér was the father of Hans Holmér, who headed the special unit investigating the assassination of the Swedish Prime Minister Olof Palme in 1986.
