= Pierre Failliot =

French sportsman & France international rugby union player

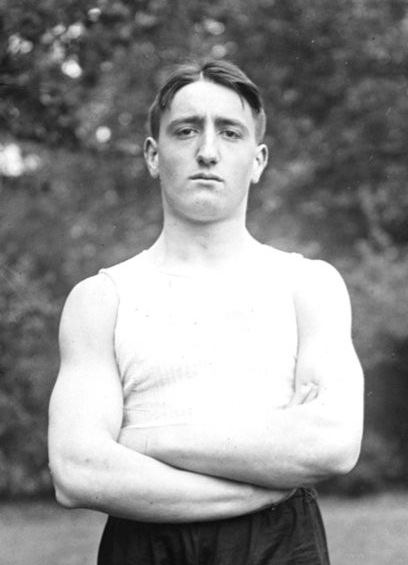
- Pierre Failliot in 1909

Personal information
- Born: 25 February 1889 Paris, France
- Died: 31 December 1935 (aged 46) Paris, France

Sport
- Sport: Athletics
- Events: 100–400 m, pentathlon, decathlon
- Club: Racing Club de France, Paris

Achievements and titles
- Personal bests: 100 m – 11.0 (1909); 200 m – 22.6 (1911); 400 m – 49.0 (1908)
Medal record
Representing France
Olympic Games
Silver medal – second place	1912 Stockholm	4×400 metre relay

Pierre Failliot (French: [pjɛʁ fajo]; 25 February 1889 – 31 December 1935) was a French athlete. He competed at the 1912 Summer Olympics in six events: pentathlon, decathlon, 100 m, 200 m, 4 × 100 m and 4 × 400 m relay. He won a silver medal in the 4 × 400 m relay, finished 17th in the pentathlon, and was less successful in other events.

He also played rugby union for France, appearing eight times from 1911 to 1913.
