= Harry Grumpelt =

American high jumper (1885–1973)

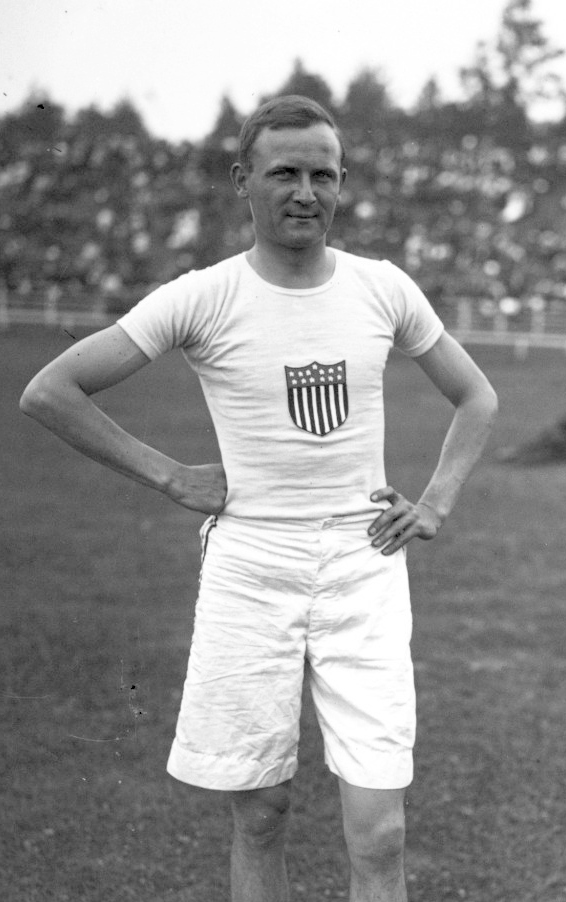
- Harry Grumpelt in 1912

Personal information
- Born: March 2, 1885 New York City, United States
- Died: November 3, 1973 (aged 88) Bronxville, New York, United States
- Height: 1.78 m (5 ft 10 in)
- Weight: 64 kg (141 lb)

Sport
- Sport: Athletics
- Event: High jump
- Club: NYAC, New York

Achievements and titles
- Personal best: 1.905 m (1911)

Harry John Grumpelt (March 2, 1885 – November 3, 1973) was an American high jumper and accountant. He competed at the 1912 Summer Olympics and finished sixth. Grumpelt won the AAU title in 1910 (indoors) and 1911 (outdoors); he placed second outdoors in 1908, 1910 and 1912, and third in 1914. Grumpelt was bursar of the New York Public Library until his 1950 retirement.
