= Hugo Wieslander =

Swedish track and field athlete

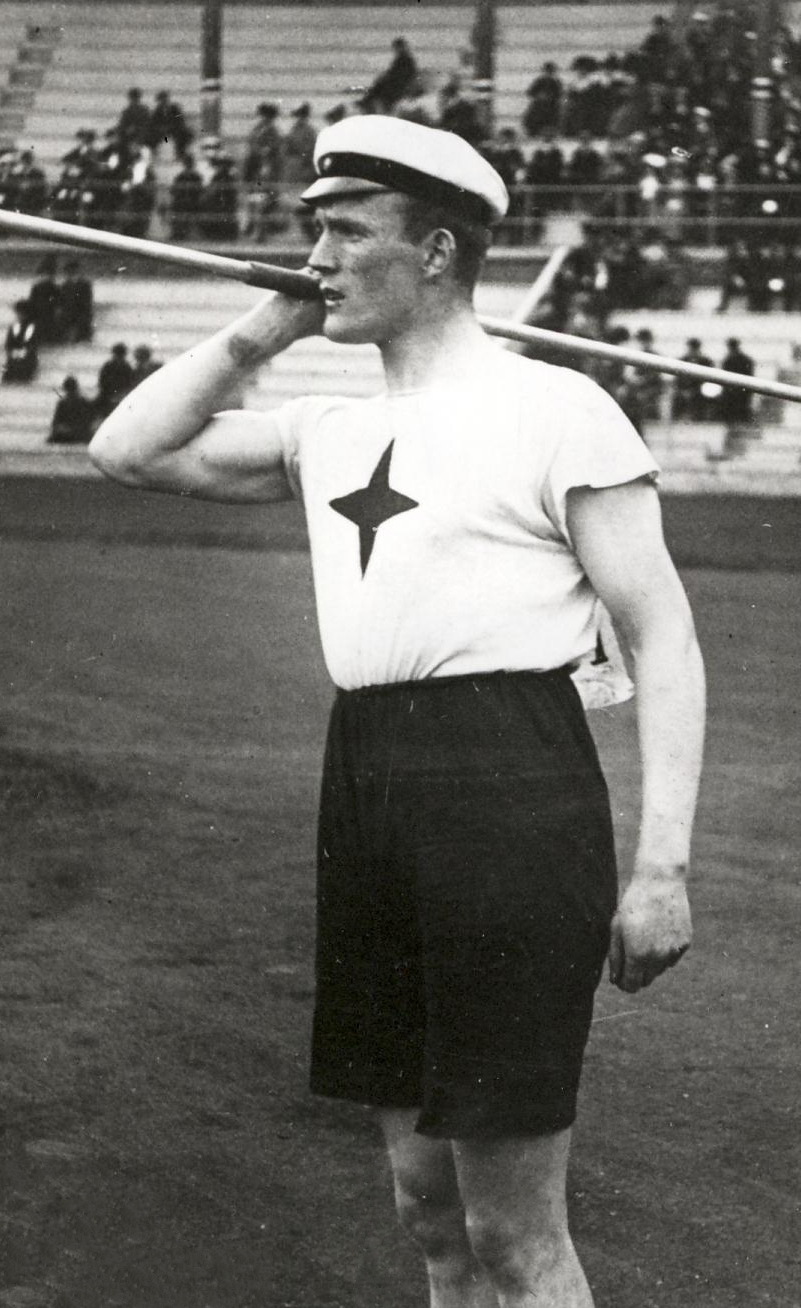
- Hugo Wieslander in the 1910s

Personal information
- Born: 11 June 1889 Ljuder, Lessebo, Sweden
- Died: 24 May 1976 (aged 86) Bromma, Stockholm, Sweden
- Height: 1.82 m (6 ft 0 in)
- Weight: 81 kg (179 lb)

Sport
- Sport: Athletics
- Events: Long jump, high jump, shot put, discus throw, javelin throw, decathlon
- Club: IFK Stockholm

Achievements and titles
- Personal bests: LJ – 6.56 m (1912); HJ – 1.80 m (1908); SP – 13.15sq (1908); DT – 37.53 m (1908); JT – 52.77 m (1908); Decathlon – 5965 (1912)
Medal record
Representing Sweden
Olympic Games
Silver medal – second place	1912 Stockholm	Decathlon

Karl Hugo Wieslander (11 June 1889 – 24 May 1976) was a Swedish athlete. He set the inaugural world record in the pentathlon in Gothenburg in 1911 with a score of 5516 points. The following year, he finished second in the decathlon at the 1912 Summer Olympics in Stockholm, 688 points behind Jim Thorpe. In 1913, after it was discovered that Thorpe had played semi-professional baseball for a minor league team, Thorpe was disqualified for not being an amateur. Wieslander was declared the winner of the 1912 Olympics event and awarded the gold medal, which he refused to accept. In 1982, Thorpe was reinstated by the IOC with Hugo Wieslander as joint winners of the 1912 Olympic decathlon. The IOC announced 15 July 2022 that Thorpe's gold medal had been reinstated and Wieslander, whose family had considered Thorpe the rightful winner, became the silver medalist.

Wieslander competed in the long jump, discus throw, shot put and two types of javelin throw at the 1908 Olympics. He completed only the freestyle javelin throw event, in which he placed fifth. At the 1912 Olympics, besides his decathlon achievement, he finished seventh in the pentathlon. Nationally Wieslander won four Swedish titles: in the high jump (1907), decathlon (1909) and pentathlon (1910 and 1911); in 1906–1908 he placed second-third eight times in various jumping and throwing events. In 1913, he passed the state surveying exam and became employed by the Swedish cartography agency (sv:Rikets allmänna kartverk).

For many years, he was uncomfortable with keeping the 1912 gold medal and contemplated returning it to Thorpe. In 1951, he reconsidered and instead donated it to the sports museum at the Swedish School of Sport and Health Sciences. In 1954, it was stolen from the museum and was never recovered.
