= George Philbrook =

American athlete

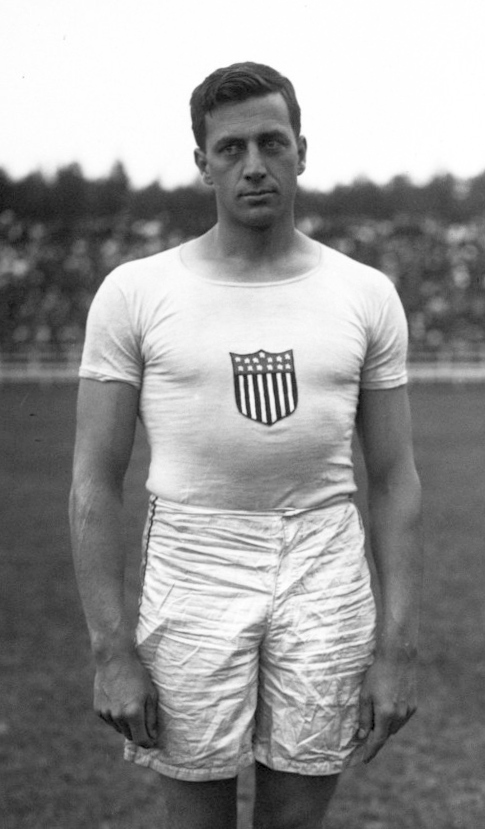
- Philbrook in 1912

Personal information
- Born: October 10, 1884 Sierraville, California, U.S.
- Died: March 25, 1964 (aged 79) Vancouver, Washington, U.S.
- Height: 1.87 m (6 ft 2 in)
- Weight: 86 kg (190 lb)

Sport
- Sport: Athletics
- Event(s): Shot put, discus throw, javelin throw, decathlon
- Club: Notre Dame Fighting Irish

Achievements and titles
- Personal best(s): SP – 14.02i m (1912); DT – 42.66 m (1914); JT – 45.06 m (1912); Decathlon – 6538* (1912)

George Warren Philbrook (October 10, 1884 – March 25, 1964) was an American football player and coach, track and field athlete and coach, and college athletics administrator. He competed at the 1912 Summer Olympics, where he failed to complete his decathlon program, and finished fifth in the shot put and seventh in the discus throw. Philbrook played college football at the University of Notre Dame. His roommate at Notre Dame in 1909 was Knute Rockne. He served as the head football coach at Whittier College from 1927 to 1928 and the University of Nevada, Reno from 1929 to 1931.

Philbrook died on March 25, 1964, at the age of 79, at his home in Vancouver, Washington.

== Head coaching record ==
=== Football ===
Year	Team	Overall	Conference	Standing	Bowl/playoffs
Whittier Poets (Southern California Intercollegiate Athletic Conference) (1927–1928)
1927	Whittier	6–2–1	4–2–1	3rd	
1928	Whittier	3–4–1	2–3–1	4th	
Whittier:		9–6–2	6–5–2		
Nevada Wolf Pack (Far Western Conference) (1929–1931)
1929	Nevada	2–5–1	2–1	2nd	
1930	Nevada	2–4–2	2–1	2nd	
1931	Nevada	2–5–2	2–1–1	T–1st	
Nevada:		6–15–5	6–4–1		
Total:		15–21–7			
