= Valdemar Wickholm =

Finnish decathlete and hurdler

Valdemar Wickholm (7 November 1890 – 20 July 1970) was a Finnish track and field athlete who competed in the 1912 Summer Olympics in the decathlon and the 110 metres hurdles. He finished seventh overall in the decathlon, placing best in the pole vault, where he was joint third. He competed at the next Olympics eight years later, in both the decathlon and 400 metres hurdles.

== See also ==
- Finland at the 1912 Summer Olympics
- Finland at the 1920 Summer Olympics
