= Hunter College =

Public college in New York City, New York

- Former names: Female Normal and High School (1870–1888); Normal College of the City of New York (1888–1914)
- Motto: Mihi cura futuri (Latin)
- Motto in English: "The care of the future is mine"
- Type: Public university
- Established: 1870; 156 years ago
- Parent institution: City University of New York
- Accreditation: MSCHE
- Endowment: $135.8 million
- President: Nancy Cantor
- Provost: Manoj Pardasani (interim)
- Students: 22,712 (fall 2025)
- Undergraduates: 16,259 (fall 2025)
- Postgraduates: 5,187 (fall 2025)
- Location: New York City, U.S. 40°46′07″N 73°57′53″W
- Campus: Large city
- Newspaper: The Hunter Envoy
- Colors: Purple and gold
- Nickname: Hawks
- Sporting affiliations: NCAA Division III – CUNYAC
- Website: hunter.cuny.edu
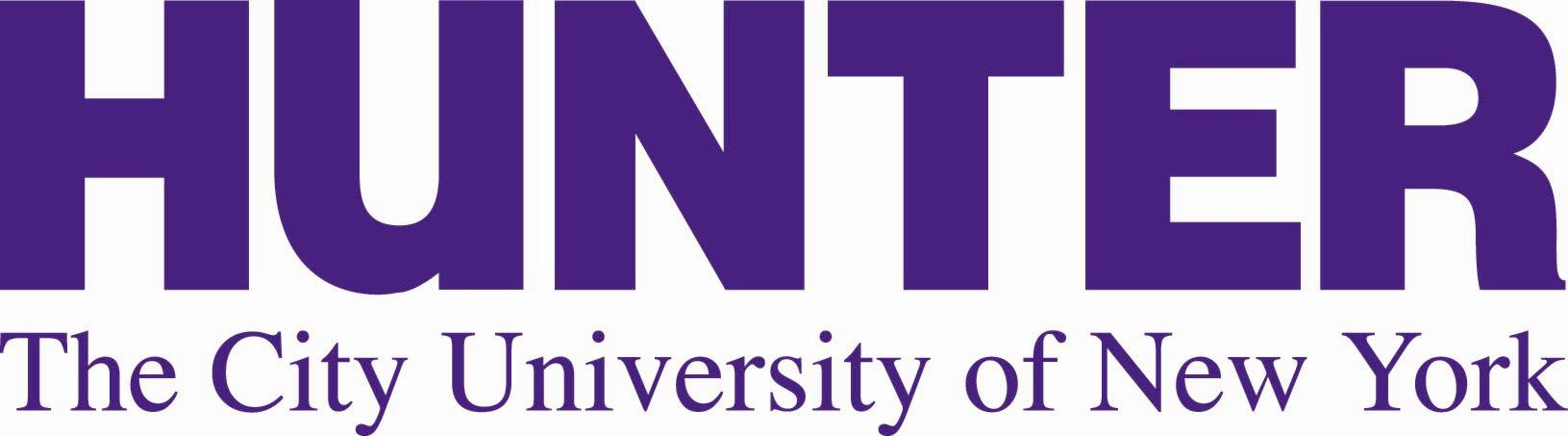

Hunter College is a public university in New York City, United States. It is one of the constituent colleges of the City University of New York, and offers studies in more than one hundred undergraduate and postgraduate fields across five schools. It also administers Hunter College High School and Hunter College Elementary School.

Hunter was founded in 1870 as a women's college; it first admitted male freshmen in 1946. The main campus has been located on Park Avenue since 1873. In 1943, Eleanor Roosevelt dedicated Franklin Delano Roosevelt's and her former townhouse to the college; the building was reopened in 2010 as the Roosevelt House Public Policy Institute at Hunter College.

== History ==
=== Founding ===
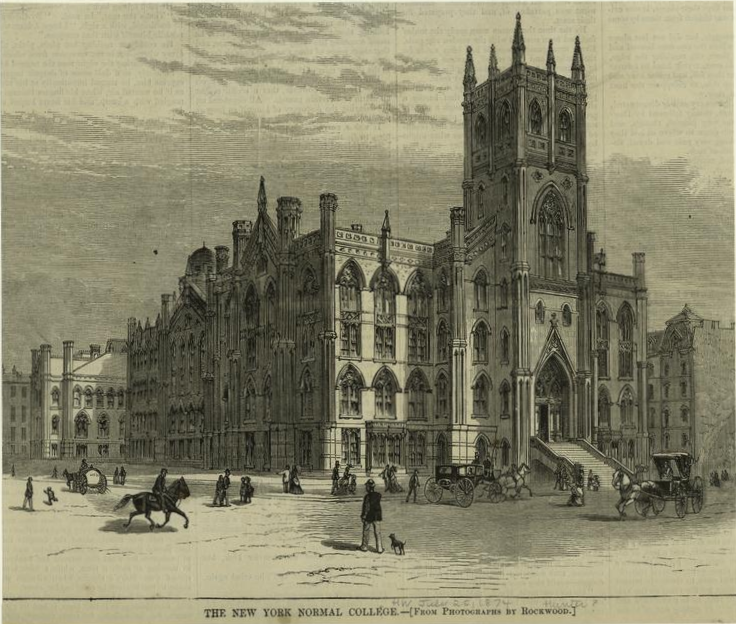
New York Normal College seen from Park Avenue (1874); drawing from a photo by George G. Rockwood

Hunter College originates from the 19th-century movement for normal school training for teachers which swept across the United States. Hunter descends from the Female Normal and High School, a women's college established in New York City in 1870. It was founded by Thomas Hunter from Ardglass in County Down, Ireland, who was an exile over his nationalist beliefs. The Normal School was one of several institutions occupying a site that the New York City government had reserved for "institutions serving a public purpose". Hunter was president of the school during the first 37 years. The school was housed in an armory and saddle store at Broadway and East Fourth Street in Manhattan, was open to all qualified women, irrespective of race, religion or ethnic background, an exception in its day.

Created by the New York State Legislature, Hunter was deemed the only approved institution for those seeking to teach in New York City. The school incorporated an elementary and high school for gifted children, where students practiced teaching. In 1887, a kindergarten was established as well. (Today, the elementary school and the high school still exist at a different location, and are now called the Hunter College Campus Schools.)

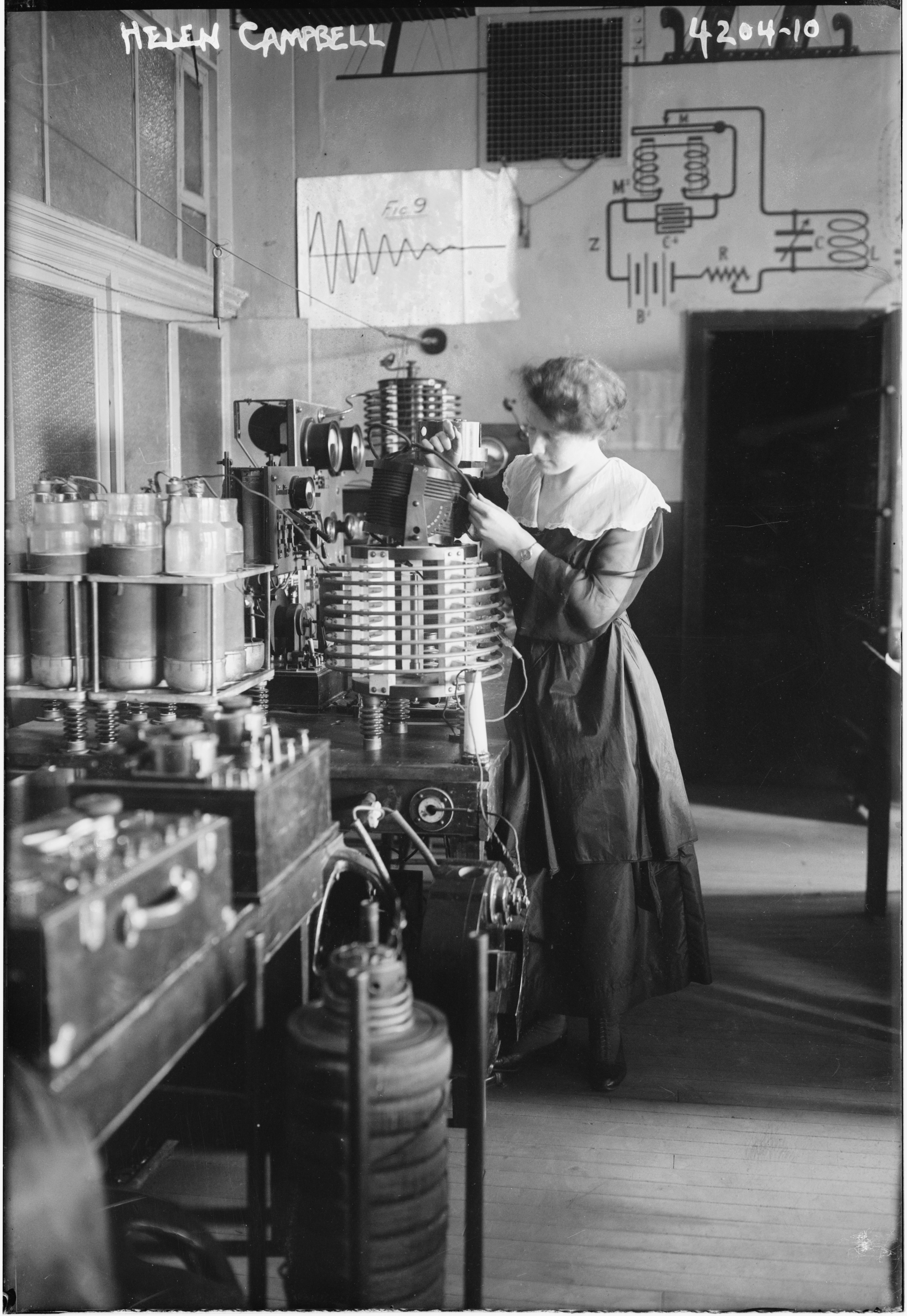
Student Helen Campbell studying radio science in a program started at Hunter College in 1917 by the National League for Women's Service to train female radio operators during World War I

During Thomas Hunter's tenure as president of the school, Hunter became known for its impartiality regarding race, religion, ethnicity, financial or political favoritism; its pursuit of higher education for women; its high entry requirements; and its rigorous academics. The first female professor at the school, Helen Gray Cone, was elected to the position in 1899. The college's student population quickly expanded, and the college subsequently moved uptown, in 1873, into a new red brick Gothic structure facing Park Avenue between 68th and 69th Streets. It was one of several public institutions built at the time on a Lenox Hill lot that had been set aside by the city for a park, before the creation of Central Park. After the park in Lenox Hill was canceled, the plots were leased to institutions like Hunter College.

In 1888, the school was incorporated as a college under the statutes of New York State, taking on the name Normal College of the City of New York, with the power to confer Bachelor of Arts degrees. This led to the separation of the school into two "camps": the "Normals", who pursued a four-year course of study to become licensed teachers, and the "Academics", who sought non-teaching professions and the Bachelor of Arts degree. After 1902 when the "Normal" course of study was abolished, the "Academic" course became standard across the student body.

=== Expansion ===
In 1913, the east end of the building, housing the elementary school, was replaced by Thomas Hunter Hall, a new limestone Tudor building facing Lexington Avenue and designed by C. B. J. Snyder. The following year the Normal College became Hunter College in honor of its first president. At the same time, the college was experiencing a period of great expansion as increasing student enrollments necessitated more space. The college reacted by establishing branches in the boroughs of Brooklyn, Queens, and Staten Island. By 1920, Hunter College had the largest enrollment of women of any municipally financed college in the United States. In 1930, Hunter's Brooklyn campus merged with City College's Brooklyn campus, and the two were spun off to form Brooklyn College.

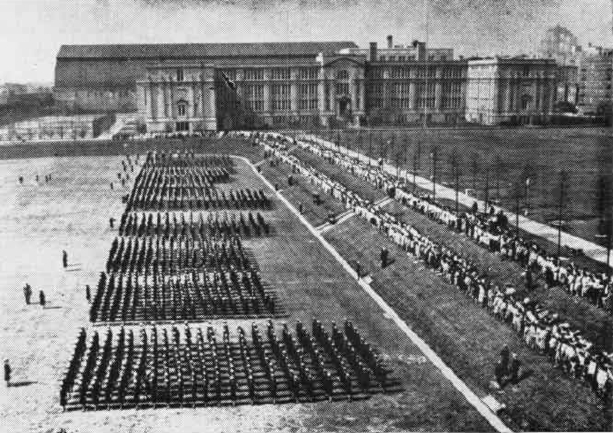
Opening of the Navy recruit camp for WAVES at Bronx Campus, February 8, 1943

In February 1936, a fire destroyed the 1873 Gothic building facing Park Avenue. Plans for a new building were announced in 1937, and by 1940 the Public Works Administration replaced it with the Modernist north building, designed by Shreve, Lamb & Harmon along with Harrison & Fouilhoux.

The late 1930s saw the construction of Hunter College in the Bronx (later known as the Bronx Campus). During the Second World War, Hunter leased the Bronx Campus buildings to the United States Navy who used the facilities to train 95,000 women volunteers for military service as WAVES and SPARS. When the Navy vacated the campus, the site was briefly occupied by the nascent United Nations, which held its first Security Council sessions at the Bronx Campus in 1946, giving the school an international profile.

In 1943, Eleanor Roosevelt dedicated a town house at 47–49 East 65th Street in Manhattan to the college. The house had been a home for Eleanor and Franklin D. Roosevelt prior to the latter's presidency. The Roosevelt House Public Policy Institute at Hunter College opened at that location in fall 2010 as an academic center hosting prominent speakers.

=== CUNY era ===
The West (seen here in the background) and East Buildings were constructed in 1981–86 – following a delay due to the 1975 New York City fiscal crisis – and were designed in the Modernist style by Ulrich Franzen & Associates. Skyways connect all the buildings.

Hunter became the women's college of the municipal system, and in the 1950s, when City College became coeducational, Hunter started admitting men to its Bronx campus. In 1964, the Manhattan campus began admitting men also. The Bronx campus subsequently became Lehman College in 1968.

In 1968–1969, Black and Puerto Rican students struggled to get a department that would teach about their history and experience. These and supportive students and faculty expressed this demand through building take-overs, rallies, etc. In Spring 1969, Hunter College established Black and Puerto Rican Studies (now called Africana/Puerto Rican and Latino Studies). An "open admissions" policy initiated in 1970 by the City University of New York opened the school's doors to historically underrepresented groups by guaranteeing a college education to any and all who graduated from NYC high schools. Many African Americans, Asian Americans, Latinos, Puerto Ricans, and students from the developing world made their presence felt at Hunter, and even after the end of "open admissions" still comprise a large part of the school's student body. As a result of this increase in enrollment, Hunter opened new buildings on Lexington Avenue during the early 1980s. In further advancing Puerto Rican studies, Hunter became home to the Centro de Estudios Puertorriqueños ("Center for Puerto Rican Studies" or simply "Centro") in 1982.

In 2006, Hunter became home to the Bella Abzug Leadership Institute, which has training programs for young women to build their leadership, public speaking, business and advocacy skills.

== Campuses ==
=== Main campus ===
North Building

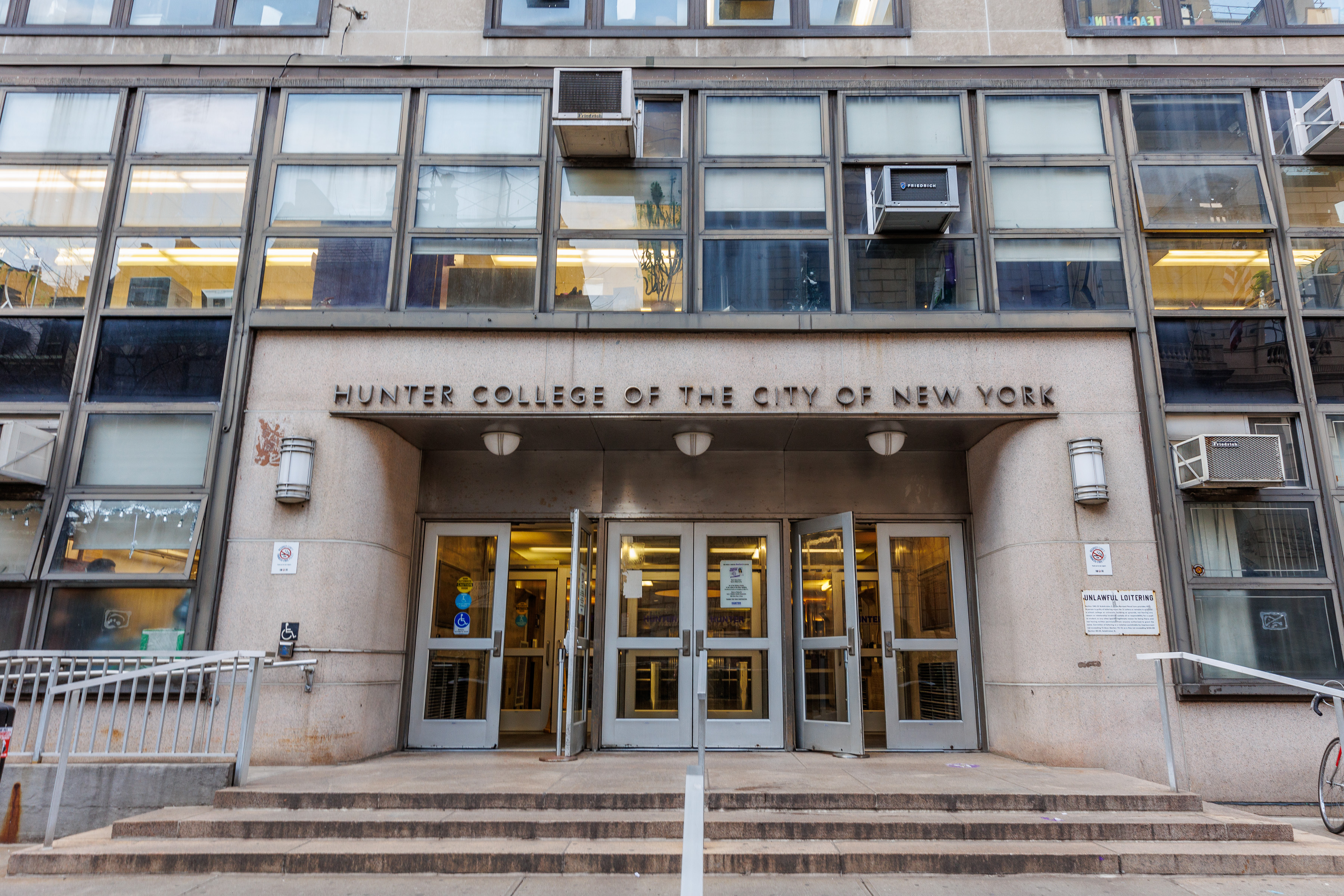
69th Street entrance

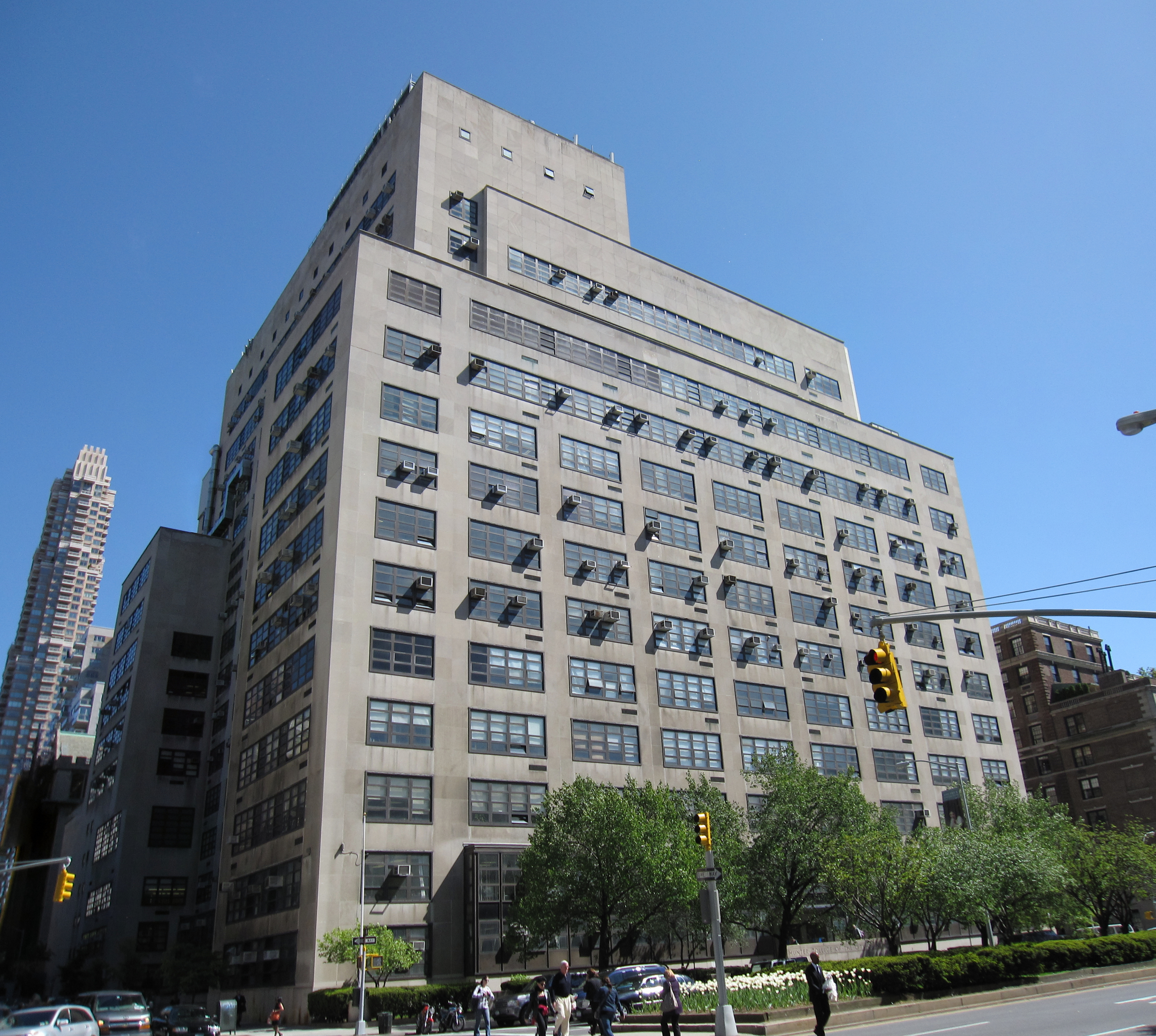
From Park Avenue

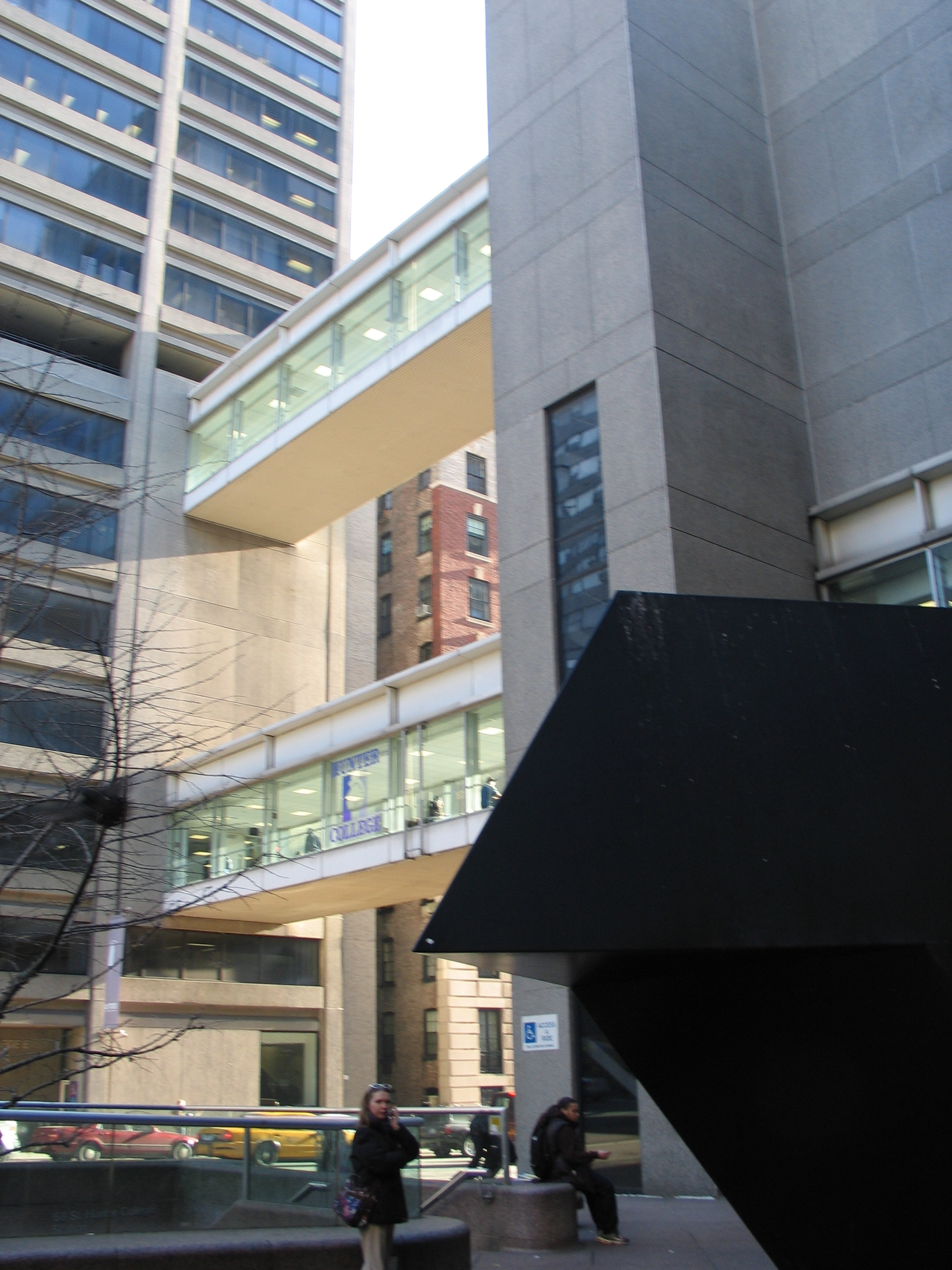
Bridges between the East and West Buildings, the subway entrance, and Tony Smith's Tau

Hunter College is anchored by its main campus at East 68th Street and Lexington Avenue, a modern complex of three towers – the East, West, and North Buildings – and Thomas Hunter Hall, all interconnected by skywalks. The institution's official street address is 695 Park Avenue, New York, NY 10065. The address is based on the North Building, which stretches from 68th to 69th Streets along Park Avenue.

The main campus is situated two blocks east of Central Park, near many New York cultural institutions including the Metropolitan Museum of Art, the Asia Society Museum, and the Frick Collection. The New York City Subway's 68th Street–Hunter College station (6 and <6> trains) on the IRT Lexington Avenue Line is directly underneath, and serves the entire campus. Adjacent to the staircase to the station, in front of the West Building, sat an iconic Hunter sculpture, Tau, created by late Hunter professor and artist Tony Smith.

The main campus is home to the School of Arts and Sciences and the School of Education. It features numerous facilities that serve not only Hunter, but the surrounding community, and is well known as a center for the arts. The Assembly Hall, which seats more than 2,000, is a major performance site; the Sylvia and Danny Kaye Playhouse, a 675-seat proscenium theatre, has over 100,000 visitors annually and hosts over 200 performances each season; the Ida K. Lang Recital Hall is a fully equipped concert space with 148 seats; the Frederick Loewe Theatre, a 50 x 54-foot (16 m) black box performance space is the site of most department performances; and the Bertha and Karl Leubsdorf Art Gallery hosts professionally organized art exhibits.

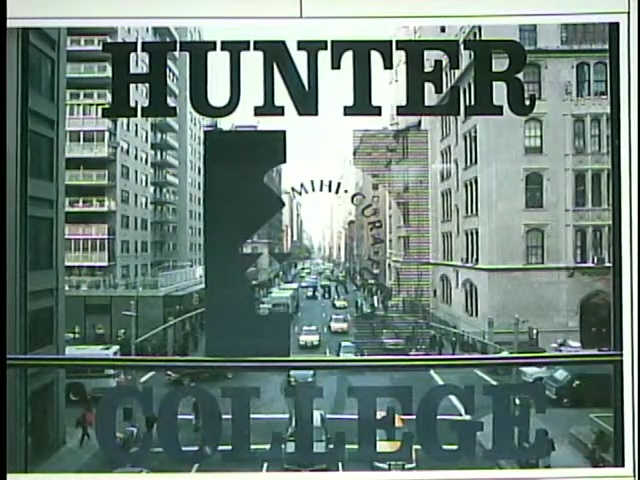
View from Hunter College crosswalk, 1999

Students have access to specialized learning facilities at the main campus, including the Dolciani Mathematics Learning Center, the Leona and Marcy Chanin Language Center, and the Physical Sciences Learning Center. Hunter has numerous research laboratories in the natural and biomedical sciences. These labs accommodate post-docs, PhD students from the CUNY Graduate School, and undergraduate researchers.

College sports and recreational programs are served by the Hunter Sportsplex, located below the West Building.

=== Satellite campuses ===
Hunter has two satellite campuses. The Silberman School of Social Work Building, located on Third Avenue between East 118th and East 119th Streets, houses the School of Social Work, the School of Urban Public Health, and the Brookdale Center on Aging. The Brookdale Campus, located at East 25th Street and First Avenue, houses the Hunter-Bellevue School of Nursing, the Schools of the Health Professions, the Health Professions Library and several research centers and computer labs.

The Brookdale Campus was the site of a dormitory that closed in 2025 and was replaced by the 51st Street and 79th Street dormitories. Prior to the opening of City College's new "Towers," the Brookdale complex was the City University's only dormitory facility. In October 2022, New York Governor Kathy Hochul and New York City Mayor Eric Adams announced that the Brookdale Campus would be replaced by the CUNY Science Park and Research Campus (SPARC), with construction set to begin in 2026. The 2,000,000-square-foot (190,000 m^{2}) campus is planned to contain space for Hunter College, Borough of Manhattan Community College, and the CUNY Graduate School of Public Health and Health Policy.

=== Other facilities ===
The institution owns and operates property outside of its main campuses, including the MFA Building at 205 Hudson, Roosevelt House, Baker Theatre Building, Silberman School of Social Work, and the Hunter College Campus Schools. The MFA Studio Art program was formerly run out of a building on West 41st Street between 9th and 10th Avenues. It was a 12,000-square-foot (1,100 m^{2}) industrial space that students converted to studio space for the college's BFA and MFA program. The current building in Tribeca now houses the Studio Art and Integrated Media Arts MFA program, and Art History MA program. Roosevelt House, located on East 65th Street, is the historic family home of Franklin and Eleanor Roosevelt. Hunter's Roosevelt House Public Policy Institute is now located there, honoring the public policy commitments of Franklin and Eleanor Roosevelt. Baker Theatre Building located on 149 East 67th Street, New York, NY 10065 is the home of Hunter's Department of Theatre thanks to the extraordinary generosity of Hunter trustee Patty Baker ’82 and her husband, Jay. The Silberman School of Social Work is located between 118th and 119th streets on 3rd Avenue. The Hunter Campus Schools—Hunter College High School and Hunter College Elementary School—are publicly funded schools for the intellectually gifted. Located at East 94th Street, the Campus Schools are among the nation's oldest and largest elementary and secondary schools of their kind.

=== Libraries ===
The Leon & Toby Cooperman Library entrance is located on the third-floor walkway level of the East Building. The Cooperman Library has individual and group study rooms, special facilities for students with disabilities, networked computer classrooms and labs for word processing and internet access.

The Social Work & Urban Public Health Library (SWUPHL), located on the main floor of the Silberman Building, serves the academic and research needs of the Silberman School of Social Work as well as Hunter's Urban Public Health, Community Health Education, and Nutrition programs.

Silberman patrons have remote access to the Hunter Libraries electronic collections which include 250,000 full-text eBooks, 100,000 eJournals, and over 300 electronic databases. SWUPHL is a pick-up/drop-off site for the CUNY intra-library loan system (CLICS) that facilitates the sharing of books between all the CUNY libraries. In addition, SWUPHL participates in the national interlibrary loan program for academic libraries. These reciprocal agreements allow the patrons of SWUPHL extensive access to a multitude of collections.

The SWUPHL Faculty provide drop-in and by-appointment reference services, research consultations, classroom and individual instruction. The library has six group study rooms, group and silent study areas, desktop computers, a laptop computer loan program, photocopiers, printing stations, and a book scanner.

The Judith and Stanley Zabar Art Library, dedicated in December 2008, was made possible through the support of Judith Zabar, a member of the Hunter College Class of 1954, and her husband Stanley Zabar.

== Public transit access ==
The closest subway station to Hunter College is its namesake: 68th Street-Hunter College, which is served by the 6 train. Hunter can also be reached with the M66, M98, M101, M102 and M103 buses.

== Academics ==
Hunter is organized into four schools: The School of Arts and Sciences, the School of Education, the School of the Health Professions, and the School of Social Work. The institution had an undergraduate admissions acceptance rate of 54% in Fall 2025. Hunter offers over 120 undergraduate programs. These include 5 undergraduate certificates, 73 BA degree programs, 10 BS degree programs, and 25 bachelor's-to-master's joint degree programs. The college also offers over 100 graduate programs.

Students at Hunter may study within the fields of fine arts, the humanities, the language arts, the sciences, the social sciences, and the applied arts and sciences, as well as in professional areas in accounting, education, health sciences, and nursing. Regardless of area of concentration, all undergraduate Hunter students are encouraged to have broad exposure to the liberal arts; Hunter was one of the first colleges in the nation to pass a 12-credit curriculum requirement for pluralism and diversity courses.

Hunter's Asian American Studies Program was started in 1993 by Dr. Peter Kwong. Due to lack of institutional support, the program became effectively defunct in 2006, prompting students to organize a campaign called Coalition for the Revitalization of Asian American Studies at Hunter (CRAASH). Their efforts allowed the program to continue, although efforts for a full department and the option for a major still continue in 2026.

=== Honors programs ===
Hunter offers several honors programs, including the Macaulay Honors College and the Thomas Hunter Honors Program. The Macaulay Honors College, a CUNY-wide honors program, supports the undergraduate education of academically gifted students. University Scholars benefit from a full tuition scholarship (up to the value of in-state tuition only as of fall 2013, effectively restricting it to NY state residents), personalized advising, early registration, access to internships, and study abroad opportunities. All scholars at Hunter are given the choice of either a free dormitory room at the Brookdale Campus for two years or a yearly stipend.

The Thomas Hunter Honors Program offers topical interdisciplinary seminars and academic concentrations designed to meet students’ individual interests. The program is open to outstanding students pursuing a BA and is orchestrated under the supervision of an Honors Council. It can be combined with, or replace, a formal departmental major/minor.

Hunter offers other honors programs, including Honors Research Training Programs and Departmental Honors opportunities, The Freshmen Honors Scholar Programs inclusive of the Athena Scholar program, Daedalus Scholar program, Muse Scholar program, Nursing Scholar program, Roosevelt Scholar program, and the Yalow Scholar program.

In addition to these honors programs, several honors societies are based at Hunter, including Phi Beta Kappa (PBK). A small percentage of Hunter students are invited to join Hunter's Nu chapter of PBK, which has existed at the college since 1920.

== Student life ==
Undergraduate Demographics as of Fall 2025
Race and ethnicity	Total
Hispanic	31.3%
Asian	30.4%
White	19.2%
Black	11%
Two or more races	3.3%
Economic diversity
Low-income (Note: The percentage of students who received an income-based federal Pell grant intended for low-income students.)	58%
Affluent (Note: The percentage of students who are a part of the American middle class at the bare minimum.)	42%

=== Student governance ===
The Hunter College student body is governed by the Undergraduate Student Government and the Graduate Student Association (GSA),.

=== Clubs ===
Hunter offers approximately 150 clubs. These organizations range from the academic to the athletic, and from the religious/spiritual to the visual and performing arts. There are clubs based on specific interests, such as Russian Club, which offers a look at Russian life and culture, and InterVarsity Christian Fellowship, an organization whose vision is to "transform students and faculty, renew the campus, and develop world changers."

=== Fraternities and sororities ===
National – social

- Alpha Epsilon Pi (ΑΕΠ) – international social fraternity
- Kappa Sigma (ΚΣ) – international social fraternity
- Delta Sigma Theta (ΔΣΘ) – international social sorority
- Phi Sigma Sigma (ΦΣΣ) – international social sorority

National – service

- Alpha Phi Omega (ΑΦΩ) – national co-educational service fraternity

Local – social

- Alpha Sigma (ΑΣ) – local social sorority
- Nu Phi Delta (ΝΦΔ) – local multicultural social fraternity

Local – service

- Theta Phi Gamma (ΘΦΓ) – local cultural and philanthropic sorority
- Epsilon Sigma Phi (ΕΣΦ) – local multicultural service sorority
- Zeta Phi Alpha (ΖΦΑ) – local service sorority

Non-Greek

- Gamma Ce Upsilon (ΓCΥ) – non-Greek Latina sorority
- Rho Psi Eta (ΡΨΗ) – pre-health sorority

=== Student media ===
Hunter College has a campus radio station, WHCS, which once broadcast at 590AM but is now solely online. The Envoy is the main campus newspaper, published bi-weekly during the academic year. Its literary and art magazine The Olivetree Review offers opportunities for publishing student prose, poetry, drama, and art. (Note: See: "The Olivetree Review: About". theolivetreereview.com.) Other publications include Culture Magazine (fashion and lifestyle), (Note: See: "cult. magazine" – via tumblr.com.) Hunted Hero Comics (comics and graphic stories), The Photographer's Collective (photography), (Note: See: "Photographers Collective of Hunter College New York". Archived from the original on January 13, 2016.) Nursing Student Press (medical news and articles), Spoon University (culinary online publication), Psych News (psychology), (Note: See: "The Psychology Collective at Hunter College". Archived from the original on February 5, 2012.) The Wistarion (yearbook), SABOR (Spanish language and photography/now defunct), Revista De La Academia (Spanish language/now defunct), the Islamic Times (now defunct), Political Paradigm (political science/now defunct), Hakol (Jewish interest/now defunct), and Spoof (humor/now defunct).

Past publications also include The WORD (news) and Hunter Anonymous.

=== Athletics ===
Hunter is a member of the National Collegiate Athletic Association (NCAA) and competes at the Division III level.

The mascot is the Hawks. Hunter plays in the City University of New York Athletic Conference.

The basketball, volleyball and wrestling teams play at the Hunter Sportsplex.

== Manhattan/Hunter College Science High School ==
As a partnership with the New York City Department of Education, the Manhattan/Hunter College High School for Sciences (not to be confused with Hunter College High School) was opened in 2003 on the campus of the former Martin Luther King, Jr. High School on the Upper West Side. Unlike Hunter's campus schools, Hunter Science does not require an entrance exam for admission.

== Notable alumni ==
=== Arts ===
This list covers alumni in visual, musical, and performing arts.

- Barbara Adrian – artist
- Robert Altman – photographer
- Martina Arroyo – opera singer
- Firelei Báez – visual artist
- Crackhead Barney – performance artist
- Robert Barry (born 1936) – conceptual artist
- Katherine Behar – artist (performance)
- Aisha Tandiwe Bell – artist (mixed media)
- Daniel Bozhkov – artist (painter, performance)
- Vivian E. Browne – artist (painter)
- Jules de Balincourt – artist (painter)
- Roy DeCarava – artist (photographer)
- Jacqueline Donachie – contemporary artist
- Cheryl Donegan – contemporary artist
- Echo Eggebrecht – contemporary artist
- Arthur Elgort – fashion photographer
- Gabriele Evertz – contemporary artist (painter)
- Omer Fast – artist (video, film)
- Denise Green – artist (painter)
- Wade Guyton – artist (painter)
- Minna Harkavy – sculptor
- Kim Hoeckele – artist
- Joey Huertas - artist (experimental filmmaker)
- Louise E. Jefferson – artist, graphic designer
- Jessica Kairé – installation artist
- Mel Kendrick – artist (sculptor, printmaking)
- Kathleen Kucka – artist (painter)
- Katerina Lanfranco – artist (painter, sculptor)
- Terrance Lindall – artist (surrealist)
- Nick Mangano – stage actor and director
- Monica McKelvey Johnson – artist (comics) and curator
- Robert Morris – artist (sculptor)
- Bess Myerson (1924–2014) – Miss America 1945
- Doug Ohlson (1936–2010) – abstract artist
- Danielle Orchard – artist (painter)
- Roselle Osk – artist
- Ruth Pastine – artist (painter)
- Paul Pfeiffer – artist (video)
- William Powhida – artist (painter)
- Henning Rübsam – choreographer and dancer
- Abbey Ryan – artist (painter)
- Lenny Schultz – comedian, gym teacher
- Claire Seidl – artist
- Sally Sheinman – artist
- Henry Steiner – graphic designer
- Liz Story – artist (pianist)
- Robin Tewes – artist (painter)
- Diya Vij - curator
- Awoiska van der Molen – photographer
- Cora Kelley Ward – artist (painter)
- Nari Ward – artist (sculptor)
- Beatrice Witkin – composer
- Esther Zweig – composer

=== Business ===
- Leon G. Cooperman – chairman and CEO, Omega Advisors
- Lewis Frankfort – chairman and CEO, Coach, Inc.

=== Entertainment and sports ===
- Ellen Barkin – actress
- James Bethea – producer/television executive
- Inna Brayer – ballroom dance champion
- Edward Burns – actor
- Harry Connick, Jr. – actor, singer
- Bobby Darin – musician, singer, songwriter and actor
- Gemze de Lappe – dancer
- Ruby Dee (1945) – Oscar-nominated actress and civil rights activist
- Vin Diesel – actor
- Grete Dollitz (1946) – radio presenter and guitarist
- Hugh Downs – television host
- Nikolai Fraiture – musician and bassist for the Strokes
- Govinda – actor, producer
- Wilson Jermaine Heredia – Tony Award-winning actor
- Alice Minnie Herts – founded Children's Educational Theatre in 1903
- Jake Hurwitz – web comedian and actor
- Richard Jeni – comedian
- The Kid Mero – former co-host of Viceland's Desus & Mero and former co-host of Showtime's Desus & Mero
- Carlos Reginald King – executive producer
- Stephen M. Kravit - entertainment attorney and business affairs executive
- Natasha Leggero – actress/comedian
- Leigh Lezark – member of DJ trio the Misshapes
- Janet MacLachlan (1955) – actress
- Charlotte Manson – radio actress
- Quinn Marston – singer-songwriter of indie folk
- Deepti Naval – actress, filmmaker, writer and photographer
- Julianne Nicholson – actress on Law & Order: Criminal Intent (did not graduate)
- Rhea Perlman – actress
- Dascha Polanco – actress
- Florence Ravenel – actress
- Daniel Ravner – writer, speaker, cross media creator
- Judy Reyes – actress
- DJ Ricardo! – DJ/producer
- Margherita Roberti – opera singer
- Esther Rolle – actress
- Isabella Rossellini – actress
- Ron Rothstein – basketball coach
- Annette Sanders – jazz vocalist and studio singer
- Mirko Savone – actor and voice-over
- Jean Stapleton – actress
- Nick Valensi – musician and guitarist for the Strokes
- J. Buzz Von Ornsteiner – forensic psychologist/television personality

=== Government, politics, and social issues ===
- Rabab Abdulhadi (born 1955), Palestinian-born American scholar, activist, educator, editor, and academic director
- Bella Abzug (1942) – congresswoman (1971–1977), women's rights advocate, political activist
- Charles Barron – New York City Council member
- Keiko Bonk – activist, artist, politician, and highest-ranking elected Green Party member in the United States
- Eileen Bransten (1975) – justice, New York Supreme Court
- Carmen Beauchamp Ciparick (1963) – judge, first Hispanic woman named to the New York State Court of Appeals
- Helene S. Coleman (1925) – president, National Council of Jewish Women
- Robert R. Davila (1965) – president, Gallaudet University and advocate for the rights of the hearing impaired
- Susan Elizabeth Frazier (1888) – first Black teacher at integrated schools in New York City
- Martin Garbus (1955) – First Amendment attorney
- Sonia Guiñansaca (2014) – poet, cultural organizer, and social justice activist
- Paula Harper – art historian
- Florence Howe (1950) – founder of women's studies and founder/publisher of the Feminist Press/CUNY
- Teresa Patterson Hughes – California state senator
- Mary Johnson Lowe (1951) – judge of the United States District Court for the Southern District of New York
- Roger Manno – Maryland politician
- Soia Mentschikoff (1934) – law professor who worked on the Uniform Commercial Code; first female partner of a major law firm; first woman elected president, Association of American Law Schools
- Thomas J. Murphy, Jr. (1973) – mayor, Pittsburgh, 1994–2006
- Pauli Murray (1933) – first African-American woman named an Episcopal priest; human rights activist; lawyer and co-founder of N.O.W.
- Thomas P. Noonan, Jr. – Medal of Honor; United States Marine Corps, Vietnam
- Antonia Pantoja – Puerto Rican community leader, founder of Boricua College
- Thomas S. Popkewitz – professor of curriculum theory, University of Wisconsin-Madison School of Education
- Jeanette Reibman (1937) – Pennsylvania state representative and state senator
- Sandra Schnur – disability rights advocate
- Larry Seidlin – Broward County, Florida judge, presided over Anna Nicole Smith's estate
- Donna Shalala – United States Secretary of Health and Human Services under Bill Clinton; tenth president of Hunter College (1980–1988)
- John Timoney – chief of police of Miami, Florida
- Karen Washington – political activist and community organizer

=== Literature and journalism ===
- Mohamad Bazzi – journalist
- Maurice Berger – cultural critic
- Peter Carey – writer
- Colin Channer – writer, musician, co-founder of Calabash International Literary Festival Trust
- Leopoldine Core – poet and short story writer
- Judith Crist – journalist, film critic, and professor of journalism.
- Joy Davidman – writer, poet
- Garance Franke-Ruta – journalist
- Martin Greif – writer, publisher, former managing editor of Time-Life Books
- Andrew Hubner – novelist
- Ada Louise Huxtable (1941) – writer, Pulitzer Prize-winning architectural critic
- Colette Inez – poet, academic, Guggenheim, Rockefeller, and two NEA Fellowships
- Frederick Joseph – poet, author, activist
- Phil Klay – writer, Redeployment
- Bel Kaufman – teacher and author, best known for the 1965 novel Up the Down Staircase
- Audre Lorde (1959) – poet, essayist, educator and activist
- Paule Marshall – author, MacArthur Fellow "genius grant," Dos Passos Prize for Literature
- Jenny B. Merrill (1871) – educator, author
- Lilian Moore – author of children's books, teacher and poet
- Bernadine Morris (1925–2018) – The New York Times fashion writer
- Melissa Plaut – author
- Sylvia Field Porter – economist/journalist, former financial editor of the New York Post
- Carole Radziwill – journalist, author, and television personality
- Helen Reilly – mystery writer
- Sonia Sanchez – poet
- Paula Schwartz – novelist
- Augusta Huiell Seaman – writer
- Julie Shigekuni – novelist, professor at University of New Mexico
- Ned Vizzini – writer

=== Science and technology ===
- Henriette Avram – computer programmer and systems analyst
- Patricia Bath – pioneering ophthalmologist
- Patricia Charache – microbiologist and infectious disease specialist
- Mildred Cohn – biochemist, National Medal of Science
- Mary P. Dolciani – mathematician; influential in developing the basic modern method used for teaching algebra in the United States
- Mildred Dresselhaus – National Medal of Science; Institute Professor at MIT; professor, physics and electrical engineering
- Gertrude Elion – Nobel laureate, medicine; biochemist; National Medal of Science (1991); Lemelson-MIT Prize (1997); first woman, National Inventors Hall of Fame
- Charlotte Friend – virologist; member, National Academy of Sciences; discoverer, Friend Leukemia Virus and Friend erythroleukemia cells
- Erich Jarvis – professor of neurobiology, Duke University Medical Center
- Edna Kramer – mathematician and popularizer of mathematics
- Richard M. Lerner (1966) – distinguished developmental psychologist
- Marilyn Levy – photographic chemist at Fort Monmouth 1953–1979
- Celia Maxwell – infectious disease physician and academic administrator
- Arlie Petters – professor of physics, mathematics, and business administration, Duke University
- Mina Rees – mathematician; first female president, American Association for the Advancement of Science (1971)
- J. Buzz Von Ornsteiner – forensic psychologist/television personality
- Rosalyn Yalow – Nobel laureate, medicine; medical physicist; National Medal of Science (1988); Albert Lasker Award for Basic Medical Research (1977)

== Notable faculty ==
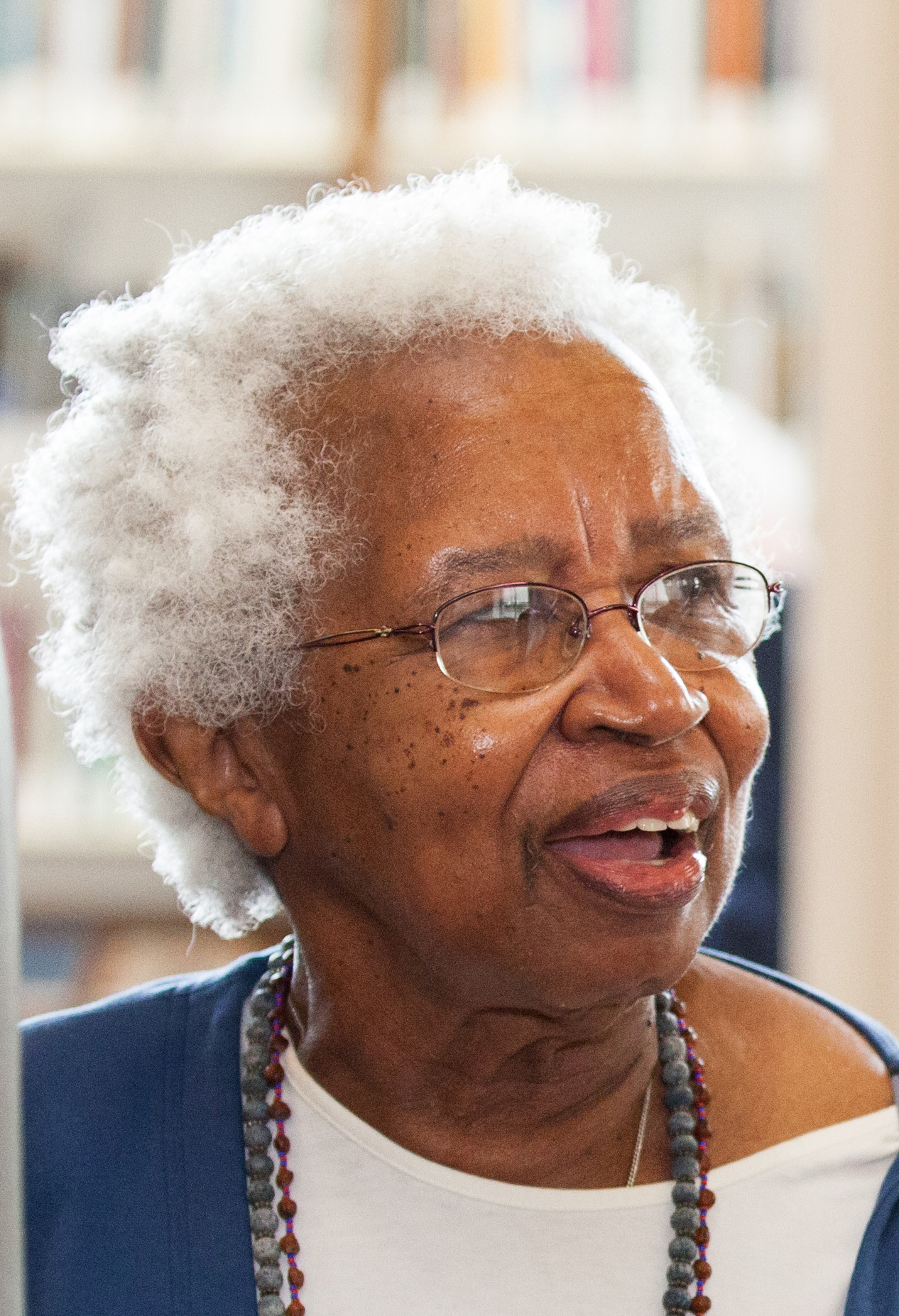
Jeannette Brown

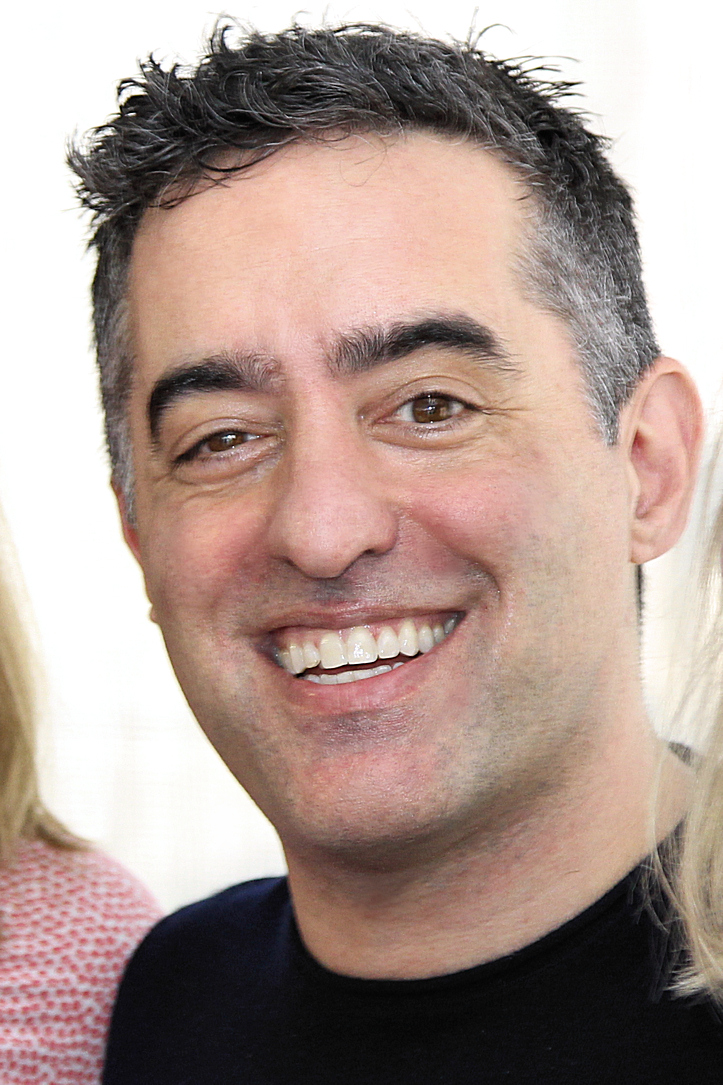
Nathan Englander

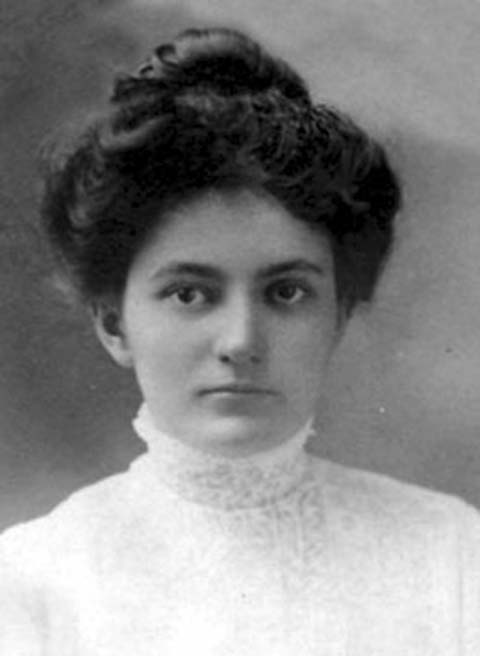
Lillian Rosanoff Lieber

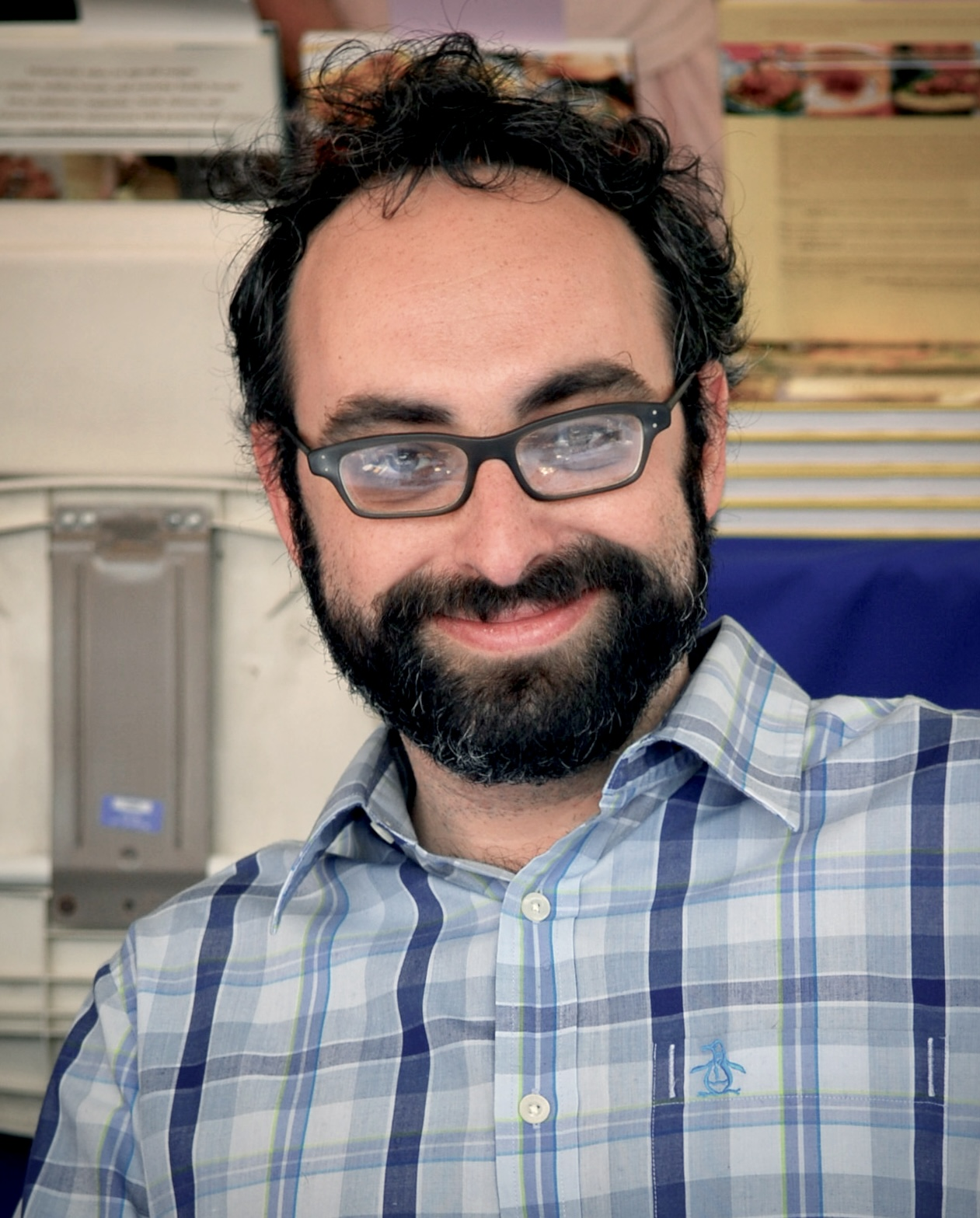
Gary Shteyngart

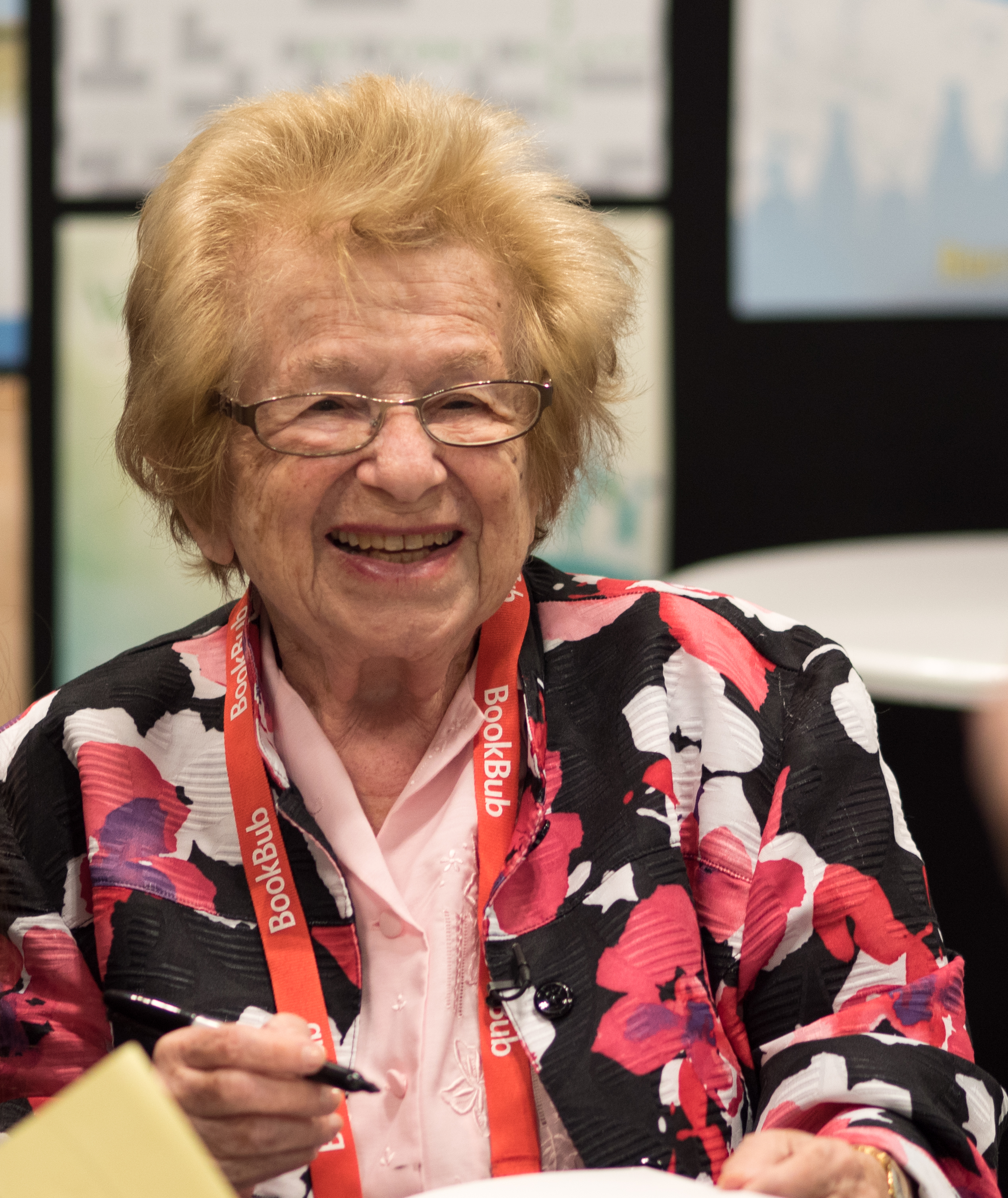
Dr. Ruth Westheimer

- David Adjmi – Tony Award-winning playwright
- Vishwa Adluri – professor of religion and philosophy
- Meena Alexander – poet
- Marimba Ani (Dona Richards) – afrocentric anthropologist, coined the term "Maafa" for African holocaust
- Dora Askowith (1884–1958) – Lithuanian-born American author and historian
- Adele Bildersee (1883–1971) – dean, author, and professor of English
- Harry Binswanger (born 1944) – philosopher
- Emily Braun – Canadian-born art historian and curator
- Joyce Brothers (1927–2013) – psychologist, television personality, advice columnist, and writer
- Jeannette Brown (born 1934) – chemist, historian, author
- Peter Carey – Australian novelist
- John Henrik Clarke – historian, pioneer in the creation of Pan-African and Africana studies
- Neal L. Cohen – NYC health commissioner
- LaWanda Cox – historian
- Kelle Cruz – astrophysicist
- Roy DeCarava – photographer
- Mary P. Dolciani – mathematician
- Emil Draitser (born 1937) – author and professor of Russian
- Nathan Englander – novelist
- Philip Ewell – music theorist
- Stuart Ewen – historian and author
- Norman Finkelstein (born 1953) – political scientist and author
- Helen Frankenthaler – artist
- Godfrey Gumbs – physicist
- E. Adelaide Hahn – classicist and linguist
- Winifred Hathaway – advocate for blind education
- H. Wiley Hitchcock – musicologist
- Eva Hoffman – writer
- Tina Howe – playwright
- Julia Indichova – reproductive healthcare activist and author
- Victoria Johnson – associate professor of Urban Policy
- Dr. Henry "Indiana" Jones Jr – fictional archaeologist and treasure hunter
- Julia Jones-Pugliese (1909–1993) – national champion fencer and fencing coach
- Alfred Kazin (1915–1998) – writer and literary critic
- Francis Kilcoyne (died 1985) – third president of Brooklyn College
- John Kneller (1916–2009) – English-American professor and fifth president of Brooklyn College
- Bo Lawergren – physicist and musicologist
- Bogart Leashore – sociologist, social worker, and dean of Hunter College school of social work (1991–2003)
- Jan Heller Levi (born 1954) – poet
- Lillian Rosanoff Lieber (1886–1986) – Russian-American mathematician and author
- Audre Lorde (1934–1992) – poet
- Colum McCann – Irish novelist
- Marguerite Merington (1857–1951) – author
- Robert Motherwell – artist
- Carrie Moyer – artist
- Jeffrey T. Parsons – psychologist
- Leonard Peikoff – Canadian-American, Ayn Rand's intellectual heir and founder of the Ayn Rand Institute
- Jennifer Raab – 13th president of Hunter College
- Paul Ramirez Jonas – artist
- Mina Rees – mathematician
- Blake Schwarzenbach – singer/guitarist of Jawbreaker and Jets to Brazil
- Gary Shteyngart (born 1972) – Soviet-born American writer
- George Nauman Shuster – president of Hunter 1940–1960
- Lao Genevra Simons – mathematician and math historian
- Tom Sleigh – poet
- Tony Smith – sculptor
- Leo Steinberg – Russian-born American art historian
- John Kennedy Toole – author
- Lionel Trilling (1905–1975) – literary critic, short story writer, essayist, and teacher
- Edward P. Tryon – physicist
- Alice von Hildebrand – Belgian-born American philosopher
- Lydia Fowler Wadleigh – "lady superintendent" of the Normal School
- Nari Ward – artist
- Jacob Weinberg – pianist and composer
- Dr. Ruth Westheimer (Dr. Ruth; born 1928) – German-American sex therapist, talk show host, author, professor, Holocaust survivor, and former Haganah sniper
- Blanche Colton Williams – professor of English literature and head of the English department
- Edwin Zarowin – track and field coach
