= Jeffrey T. Parsons =

American psychologist, researcher, and educator

- Education: University of Puget Sound (BA); University of Houston(PhD)
- Employer: unknown / none
- Organization(s): Center for HIV/AIDS Educational Studies & Training (CHEST)
- Title: Distinguished Professor
- Website: www.chestnyc.org

Jeffrey T. Parsons (born 1967) is an American psychologist, researcher, and educator; he was a Distinguished Professor of Psychology at Hunter College and The Graduate Center of the City University of New York (CUNY) and was the Director of Hunter College's Center for HIV/AIDS Educational Studies & Training, which he founded in 1996. Parsons was trained as a developmental psychologist and applied this training to understand health, with a particular emphasis on HIV prevention and treatment. He was known for his research on HIV risk behaviors of gay, bisexual, and other men who have sex with men (GBMSM), HIV-related syndemics, and sexual compulsivity. He resigned his positions at CUNY on July 3, 2019, following a year-long university investigation of misconduct allegations against him. In 2023, the U.S. Attorney's Office announced that he was required to pay a $375,000 settlement for engaging in fraud against the federal government for many years.

== Education and training ==
Parsons received his B.A. in Psychology from the University of Puget Sound in Tacoma, WA in 1988 with a minor in Theatre Arts. He went on to complete an M.A. in 1990 and Ph.D. in 1992 in Developmental Psychology from the University of Houston in Houston, TX. While there, he worked with Dr. Alexander Siegel on understanding the health risk behaviors of adolescents, with a primary focus on substance use.

== Research ==
Parsons was a nationally and internationally recognized expert in HIV prevention and treatment, having been particularly influential on understanding health risk behaviors associated with HIV transmission and HIV-related health outcomes for GBMSM. He was a pioneer in understanding the etiology and consequences of sexual compulsivity (now often referred to as hypersexuality) for GBMSM as well as having produced influential work on topics ranging from understanding intentional condomless sex (i.e., barebacking) and methamphetamine use to developing efficacious interventions to reduce substance use and HIV-related health risk behaviors. Parsons developed an intervention for young GBMSM that showed an effect at reducing both substance use and sexual risk and was the first intervention for this population designated as a "Best Evidence" Effective Behavioral Intervention (EBI) by the Centers for Disease Control and Prevention in the U.S. Parsons authored and co-authored more than 320 peer-reviewed publications, more than 500 conference abstracts, and 11 book chapters as well as having been Editor of one book; his work has received extensive popular media coverage.

Parsons was funded by several federal research grants between 1990 and 2019. In 1996, he founded the Center for HIV/AIDS Educational Studies & Training (CHEST) to “conduct research to identify and promote strategies that prevent the spread of HIV and improve the lives of people living with HIV.” Since that time, Parsons received more than $55 million USD in funding as Principal Investigator from the National Institutes of Health (including the National Institute on Drug Abuse, the National Institute of Mental Health, the National Institute on Alcohol Abuse and Alcoholism, the Eunice Kennedy Shriver National Institute of Child Health and Human Development, and the National Institute of Allergy and Infectious Diseases), Centers for Disease Control and Prevention, and other federal agencies.

== Career ==
Parsons was appointed as a Research Psychologist at the Mount Sinai Hemophilia Treatment Center in New York City from 1991 to 1997 and an Assistant Professor in the Department of Psychology at New Jersey City University from 1992 to 1997. Shortly after founding CHEST, Parsons was promoted to Associate Professor at New Jersey City University in 1997, where he remained until he moved to Hunter College of the City University of New York in 2000. Parsons was granted tenure at Hunter College in 2003 and promoted to Full Professor in 2005; he served as the Chair of the Department of Psychology from 2008 to 2010 and was subsequently promoted to Distinguished Professor at the recommendation of Hunter's President, Jennifer Raab, and concurrence of the CUNY Board of Trustees in 2012.

Parsons held several concurrent positions while at Hunter College. He was appointed to the Doctoral Faculty in Psychology at the Graduate School & University Center (“The Graduate Center”) of CUNY in 2005 and served as Director of the Health Psychology Concentration from 2005 to 2008. From 2008 to 2016, he also served on the Doctoral Faculty in Public Health at the Graduate Center of CUNY. Parsons was Founding Chair of the Faculty Steering Committee for the LGBT Social Science and Public Policy Center at Hunter College's Roosevelt House from 2008 to 2012. Between 2012 and 2019, he was on the faculty of the Graduate Center's PhD program in Health Psychology and Clinical Science.

Parsons has served in several editorial capacities for peer-reviewed journals in the field. He was previously editor-in-chief of Sexuality Research and Social Policy as well as Associate Editor of Archives of Sexual Behavior and AIDS and Behavior. He has also been on the Editorial Boards of AIDS Education and Prevention, International Journal of Sexual Health, Human Sexuality, and LGBT Health.

Parsons served as Chair of the NIH’s Behavioral and Social Consequences of HIV study section from 2010 to 2012 after having served as a regular member of the same study section from 2007 to 2010. He was the President of the Eastern Region of the Society for the Scientific Study of Sexuality from 2005 to 2007 and served on the Board of Directors for the Society for the Advancement of Sexual Health from 2003 to 2008.

On July 3, 2019 Jeffrey Parsons resigned his position at CUNY, following a year-long investigation by the university of allegations against him related to improper drug and alcohol use and of sexual improprieties at the university affiliated events that he hosted. The investigation found that he violated CUNY’s policy on sexual misconduct and engaged “in behavior that violated CUNY’s Drug and Alcohol Policy”. Following Parson's resignation, the Hunter College renamed CHEST into PRIDE, which stands for Promoting Resilience, Intersectionality, Diversity and Equity. Subsequently, the United States Attorney for the Southern District of New York settled a civil lawsuit against Dr. Parsons for using National Institute of Health grant funding for personal trips. In the settlement Dr. Parsons agreed to pay $375,000, Hunter College agreed to pay $200,000 and made detailed factual admissions regarding their conduct.

He currently serves as the President of Old Library Theatre and is leading their non-profit status work.

== Honors and awards ==
Parsons was named Fellow of the American Psychological Association in 2008, the Society of Behavioral Medicine in 2012, and the Society for the Scientific Study of Sexuality in 2012. He received the Distinguished Scientific Contribution Award in from the American Psychological Association's Division 44 in 2008, the John Money Award from the Society for the Scientific Study of Sexuality in 2011, and the Psychology and AIDS Distinguished Leadership Award from the American Psychological Association in 2017.
