= Matthew Silver =

Matthew Silver is the name of:

- Matthew Silver (academic), Israeli historian
- Matthew Silver (performance artist), American performance artist
