= Hunter Sportsplex =

Sports facility in Manhattan, New York, US

Coordinates: 40.76781°N 73.96401°W

- Interactive map of Hunter Sportsplex
- Location: 695 Park Ave., New York, NY, 10021
- Operator: Hunter College of the City University of New York
- Surface: Hardwood

Tenants
- Hunter College Hawks; Gotham Girls Roller Derby

The Hunter Sportsplex is a multi-purpose sports facility located in Manhattan, New York, within the campus of Hunter College of the City University of New York.

It is the home of the Hunter College Hawks. Basketball, volleyball and wrestling in addition to other sports are played in the main gymnasium. An auxiliary gymnasium hosts tennis matches. The facility is also home to the Gotham Girls Roller Derby of the Women's Flat Track Derby Association (WFTDA).
