= Julia Indichova =

American reproductive healthcare activist and author

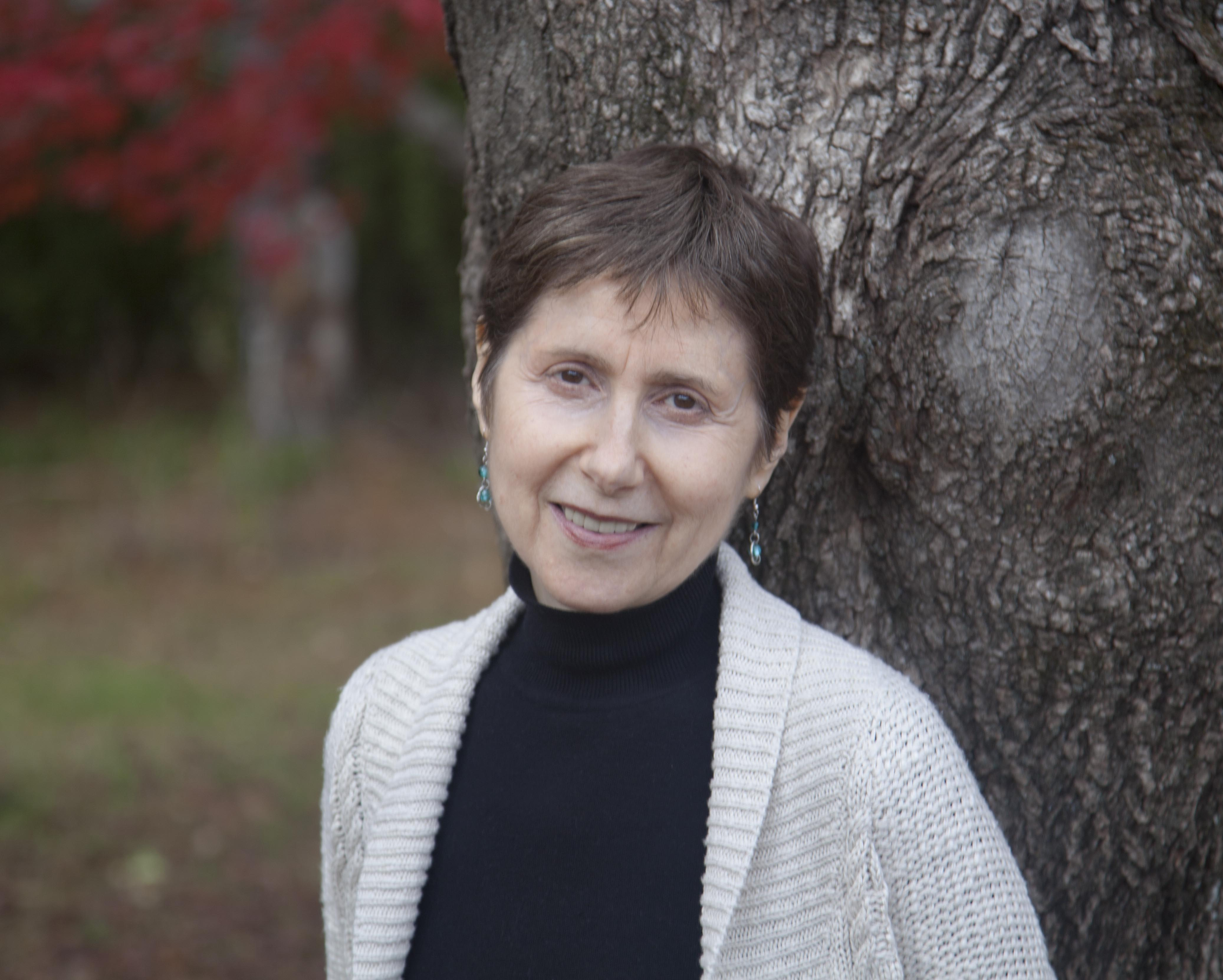
- Julia Indichova, 2011
- Born: Košice, Czechoslovakia
- Occupations: Writer, Educator, Activist
- Writing career
- Genre: Nonfiction
- Subjects: Fertility, Motherhood
- Notable works: Inconceivable, The Fertile Female
- Website: www.fertileheart.com

Julia Indichova is an American reproductive healthcare activist and author. She is best known for her book Inconceivable: A Woman’s Triumph Over Despair and Statistics (2001), which was hailed by Library Journal as “an important consumer health resource…the first such book written from the patient’s point of view.” In 1997 Indichova founded FertileHeart.com, a global, patient driven community, focused on health enhancing approaches to reproductive health.

Indichova's second book, The Fertile Female: How the Power of Longing for a Child Can Save Your Life and Change the World (2007), documents the evolution of The Fertile Heart™ Ovum Practice, an original mind body program that grew out of Indichova's personal experience and her work with women and couples who sought her guidance after the publication of Inconceivable. In the last two decades a growing number of studies and leading reproductive endocrinologists have validated Indichova's whole-person approach to overcoming infertility.

== Biography ==
Julia Indichova was born and raised in Košice, Czechoslovakia in the aftermath of World War II. Her older brother, two grandmothers and an aunt were murdered by the Nazis and both of her parents were concentration camp survivors. Attempting to come to terms with this legacy of violence has been a driving force in her life from an early age.

Indichova started working as a professional actress at the age of ten, and went on to study acting at the Academy of Performing Arts in Bratislava. In June 1969, a year after the 1968 Russian invasion of Czechoslovakia, she immigrated to the United States and in 1972 received her Bachelor of Arts degree in Theater Arts and Russian from Montclair State College.

For the next fifteen years Indichova worked in the post-production film department of the American Broadcasting Company, and later as an actress, dancer, director and producer in New York City and the New York Metropolitan area.

In 1985 Indichova received her MA in TESOL (teaching English to Speakers of Other Languages) from Hunter College in New York. In the following years, she taught English at Columbia University's American Language Program, and at the International English Language Institute at Hunter College. She also taught Russian, German, French and Latin, in the New York City public school system.

== Overcoming infertility ==
In 1992 Indichova was diagnosed with irreversible secondary infertility attributed to soaring Follicle-stimulating hormone (FSH) levels. After a futile quest for a more hopeful prognosis, she embarked on a pilgrimage of research and rigorous self-examination. In 1994, at age 44 she gave birth to a healthy baby girl, conceived naturally, in direct contradiction of all that medical dogma of the day declared possible.

Indichova's desire to share what she learned with women who sought her help led her to create in 1997 The Fertile Heart™ Ovum Mind Body Program, and launched her work as a reproductive health care educator and activist and established www.fertileheart.com, as one of the most trusted, independent consumer advocacy communities not sponsored by pharmaceutical companies or IVF clinics. Indichova's seminar, a seven-hour program of guided imagery, movement, dreamwork and instruction on nutrition, aims to identify and resolve inner blocks to conception, be they physical, emotional or spiritual. For many women, as with the women featured in the Fertile Heart Video, the process not only eliminates the need for technology and pharmaceuticals, but inspires a radical shift in lifestyle and self-care. Indichova's second book, The Fertile Female: How The Power Of Longing For A Child Can Save Your Life And Change The World (2007), documents her work with thousands of women and couples who sought her guidance after the publication of Inconceivable.

=== Additional projects ===
After 9/11, Julia Indichova initiated a series of peace projects, applying the ideas of her mind-body program to the peace effort.

== International recognition ==
Although her approach was initially met with skepticism in the medical community, over the last ten years a growing body of scientific literature has come to support Indichova's findings. In March 1999, The Journal of Reproductive Medicine for the Obstetrician and Gynecologist (Vol. 44, No. 3) published a review of recent studies titled “The Impact Of Lifestyle Choices On Female Infertility,” calling for patient education in the areas of diet, exercise, and weight management. That same year, another medical journal, Fertility and Sterility, suggested that gynecologists become more familiar with studies on nutrition, and in this way help their patients avoid the burden of costly medical procedures. A direct relationship between atmospheric contamination and human reproduction was identified in a study by the medical school at the University of Sao Paulo, in Brazil. In 2003, a study conducted by Dr. Sarah Berga, published in the journal Fertility and Sterility, titled “The Effect Of Chronic Stress Related To Behaviour And Personality,” validated the emotional aspects of the Fertile Heart™ Ovum Program.

Julia Indichova's books and workshops have been endorsed by leading specialists in reproductive endocrinology, and her story and program was featured on the Oprah Winfrey Show, Good Morning America, Pure Oxygen Television series, Discovery Health, Health magazine, USA Today, San Francisco Chronicle and other outlets. Early in 2014, Indichova was mentioned in a New York Times parenting blog.

Dr. Richard Marrs, medical director of the Center for Assisted Reproductive Medicine at Santa Monica-UCLA Medical Center, asserts that Indichova's story and work are a brilliant example of the impact of the mind-body connection. Dr. Sami David, an internationally recognized fertility specialist, and Marc Goldstein, M.D., F.A.C.S., Professor of Reproductive Medicine at Cornell University, Weill Medical College, are among the many health care providers who have praised Indichova's pioneering work.

In her forward to Inconceivable, New York Times best-selling author Dr. Christiane Northrup writes: “Each of us is part of the culture in which we were born and raised and we are influenced in body, mind, and spirit by that culture throughout our lives. At the same time, cultures change, evolve and heal because of the courage of individuals. Julia Indichova is one of those individuals. Let her be an inspiration for you of how to trust yourself, heal yourself and reconnect with the wonder of your body and all of its possibilities.”

In November 2014, Indichova was invited to keynote the first Mind Body Fertility Conference sponsored by Mount Sinai Centre for Fertility and Reproductive Health in Toronto, Canada.

== Published works ==
=== Books ===
- Inconceivable: A Woman’s Triumph Over Despair and Statistics (2001) ISBN 978-0767908207
- The Fertile Female: How the Power of Longing for a Child Can Save Your Life and Change the World (2007) ISBN 978-0966007879

=== CDs ===
- Exploring Holistic Fertility Treatment Options: A panel discussion moderated by Julia Indichova
- Body Truth (Double Audio CD): A fertility and health enhancing movement practice with Julia Indichova
- Fertile Heart Imagery:
- Fertile Heart Imagery 2: The Ovum Birthing Practice in Pictures

=== Articles ===
- Indichova, Julia (October 22, 1998) National Infertility Awareness Week: Not Inconceivable for a Second San Francisco Chronicle.
- Indichova Julia (January 14, 2008) Proceed With Caution RH Reality Check: Reproductive & Sexual Health and Justice, News, Analysis and Commentary.
- Indichova, Julia (October 31, 2010) IVF: The Heavy Cost of the Nobel Prize Common Dreams.
- Indichova, Julia (December 15, 2010) Going Holistic: A Holistic Approach to Fertility Childbirth Solutions.
- Indichova, Julia (December 16, 2010) Crisis as Opportunity Childbirth Solutions.
- Indichova, Julia (December 1, 2011) In Vitro Fertilization and Cancer: Is There A Connection? Vitality Magazine.
- Indichova, Julia (June 27, 2013) Infertility: It Can Save Your Life Huffington Post.
- Indichova, Julia (July 1, 2026) A Tug at His Sleeve New York Times.

== Family life ==
Indichova lives with her husband and two daughters in Woodstock, New York.
