= The Perspective =

Perspective library of double debates

- Website type: News and opinion
- Available in: English
- Founded: March 1, 2017; 9 years ago
- Founder: Daniel Ravner
- CEO: Daniel Ravner
- Website: ThePerspective.com
- Current status: Active

The Perspective is a library displaying two sides of current events, historic conflicts and classic debates. The site's main goal is to allow its readers direct access to news and information, unfiltered by their usual personalized browsing preferences.

== History ==
The Perspective was founded by CEO Daniel Ravner in 2016. An article published on the site in early 2017 defined the startup's objectives:

While the web was meant to broaden our horizons, the opposite has happened. Social media's filter bubbles, a fragmented media landscape, fake news, click bait and the drive to personalization have all narrowed our views. Through its mission to open minds, The Perspective seeks to counter the growing polarization that people all over the world are experiencing. It employs design and psychology to make it easier for the readers consider ideas that are different from their own.

— "Article Title", Theperspective.com (March 2017)

After initial planning, a $1,292,000 seed investment was raised in late 2016. Following a beta test of the concept, a successful launch on Product Hunt has followed in March 2017.

== Awards ==
The Perspective has received two awards since its launch, and was nominated for two others in 2018. During its first year active, the site was the recipient of the 2017 "Best of" WebAward – News Category, a W3 awards Silver Winner and an EPpy Awards winner for Best Innovation Project. In April 2018, it was announced that The Perspective had been nominated for both the Webby Award (News and Politics Category) and The Drum Award (Best Editorial Innovation).

== Site features ==
The site's features are designed to persuade readers to consider ideas threatening to their worldview:

- The Big Debates – Original articles, presenting two sides of a classic debate, but researched and written in a way that appeals to the values of those who might be opposed to it.
- Subjective Timeline – Features the biggest ongoing conflicts on a timeline that shows how the same milestones are perceived by both sides who took part in it.
- Trending Perspectives – The editorial team scours the web to find worthwhile contradictory or enriching articles and videos on daily hot topics which are displayed side by side (with short summary). Users can read, vote, comment, and play.
- The Perspective Challenge – A gamified platform where users get to influence someone they know and "pay" by allowing their own point of view be influenced.
- My Perspective – UGC platform that allows people to share how issues relate to them in their daily lives.

== Brand extensions ==
In September 2021, the Perspective launched its first book, titled What The Hell Are They Thinking? This book is a collection of 100 hotly debated topics that govern readers' lives and cover politics and government, economics, popular culture, sports, health, religion and more. The book features the website's most popular, most engaged-with "Big Debates", especially updated for this book, with 30 new debates added exclusively for the book's release. These debates were written in a way that tells both sides of every story.
