= Danielle Orchard =

American artist and painter

Danielle Orchard (born December 2, 1985) is a painter living and working in Brooklyn, New York.

== Biography ==
Orchard grew up in Fort Wayne, Indiana. She received her Bachelor of Fine Arts from Indiana University in 2009 and studied in Florence, Italy. She earned a Master of Fine Arts degree from CUNY Hunter College in 2013. Orchard is represented by Perrotin gallery in New York, NY.

== Education ==
- 2009: Bachelor of Fine Arts, Indiana University
- 2013: Master of Fine Arts, Hunter College

== Awards ==
- The Dedalus Foundation, MFA Fellowship Recipient, 2013.
- Alma B.C. Schapiro Artist in Residence, The Corporation of Yaddo, 2015

== Publications ==
- "Contemporary Female Artists to Be Obsessed With", SHK Magazine, August 24, 2014.
