= Crackhead Barney =

American performance artist and ambush interviewer

- Born: Jamaica, Queens, New York City, U.S.
- Education: Hunter College, St. John’s University
- Known for: Satirical interviews
- Notable work: Crackhead Barney and Friends
- Style: Performance art

Crackhead Barney is an American performance artist and ambush interviewer. She shares video of satirical interviews on social media as a viral interview show titled Crackhead Barney and Friends.

== Career ==
=== Beginnings ===
According to Crackhead Barney in January 2021, the Crackhead Barney persona originated "a few years ago" when she began dressing up in a Barney costume and harassing random people in New York. The costume was missing an eye, leading people to refer to her as "Crackhead Barney".

Prior to the COVID-19 pandemic in New York City, Crackhead Barney often performed in the subway. The pandemic reduced subway traffic, and she later began attending the George Floyd protests in New York City. At one demonstration, videographer and producer Drew Rosenthal saw her, and eventually convinced her to collaborate on a show called Crackhead Barney and Friends. The name parodies the name of the Barney television show.

=== Crackhead Barney and Friends ===
The Crackhead Barney and Friends series is inspired by Eric André and All Gas No Brakes.

==== Content ====
Before the 2020 United States presidential election, Crackhead Barney attended a campaign rally by Donald Trump in Staten Island. She later described it as the most dangerous video she ever filmed, stating that she was apprehended by the police and brought to a psychiatric hospital, where the police stated that she was having a mental breakdown and attempting to expose her naked body to children.

Crackhead Barney was present at the 2021 United States Capitol attack, where she interviewed rioters. She additionally attended the inauguration of Joe Biden to interview "some more Patriots and QAnon-ers". At the latter event, she was photographed by Barry Goldstein of New England Public Media, who later discussed her and the photos on Connecting Point. One photograph showed the performance artist holding "a dead rat that she picked up on the street" while the next depicted her confronting a group of National Guardspeople just outside a high-security area.

In June 2021, Crackhead Barney interviewed Andrew Giuliani, and the two ended up shouting at each other. After she asked him why he was campaigning to be Mayor of New York City, he clarified that he was running for the position of Governor of New York and stated that he was "standing for Israel" and wanted to "see a New York where you have an Israel that is respected." Crackhead Barney subsequently insulted Giuliani's father; Giuliani stated that he believed someone who made an insult like that in Palestine would be beheaded. Members of Giuliani's entourage began shouting at Crackhead Barney, at which point both she and Giuliani began arguing about whether the other had ever visited Palestine.

In July 2021 Crackhead Barney, along with performance artists Matthew Silver and David Henry Nobody Jr. wrapped themselves in tape together while chanting "we are the unborn" to disrupt a prayer outside an abortion clinic.

Crackhead Barney has additionally interviewed Jake Angeli, asked Eric Adams "how much Black pussy" he gets, and encouraged children at a New York City Police Department gathering to chant "abolish the police".

==== Platform ====
Crackhead Barney and Friends is active on social media platforms which include TikTok, Instagram, and YouTube. In December 2021, the show was added to Means TV.

==== Style ====
Crackhead Barney has stated that her videos are unscripted. She has cited Dada as an inspiration, stating that it "offers an element of terrible randomness in this terribly random state our country is in." She has also described her work as slapstick.

== Political views ==
In January 2021, Crackhead Barney described the attackers of the United States Capitol as "violent MAGA idiots." She referred to "Patriots and QAnon-ers, whatever you want to call the nazis who wear the red hats and fuck their American flags or their machine guns." She additionally stated that "Biden is trash, Kamala is trash, and Trump is definitely trash" because "Biden and fucking Kamala [...] have jailed and incriminated more Black people than Trump and Pence put together."

== Personal life ==
Asked by Metal about her identity, Crackhead Barney stated that she was born and grew up in the Jamaica neighborhood of Queens in New York City. She attended St. John's University and has a BS degree in chemistry with a minor in communications. She refused to provide more details about her background, saying that she generally avoids interviews to keep her identity hidden and that "I’m upset right now, I’m an alien from Mars, and I feel like I give you all you need to know about me from my performance art. That’s it, next question." Later in the interview, she described herself as a "Black queer woman artist". She told Ben Weiss of Input that her parents immigrated to the United States from Nigeria. She attended Hunter College, where she studied painting and sculpture.
