= Jeannette Brown =

American organic medicinal chemist, historian, and author

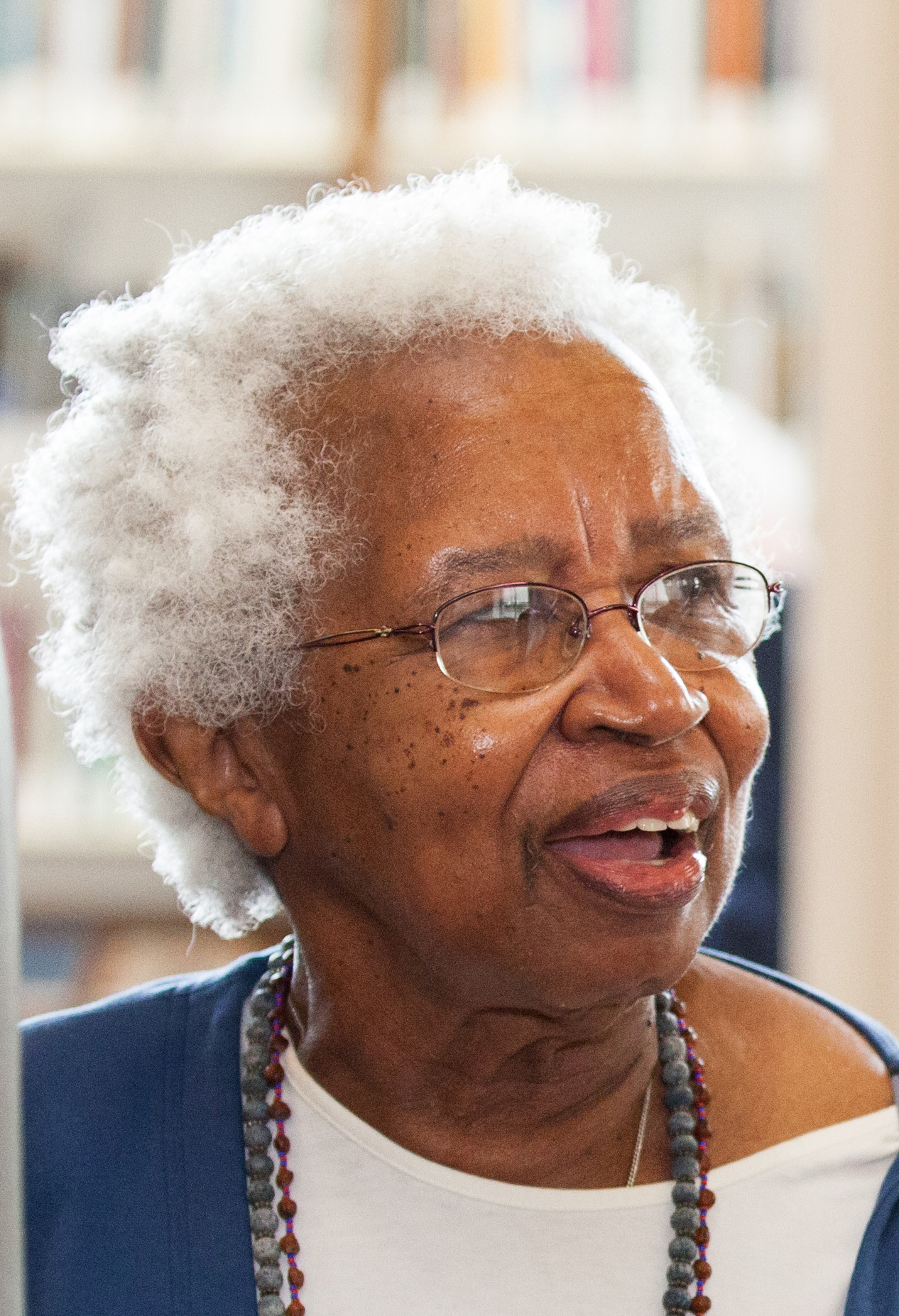
- Jeannette Brown in 2014
- Born: May 13, 1934 (age 91)
- Died: The Bronx, New York
- Education: Hunter College, University of Minnesota
- Scientific career
- Fields: Medicinal chemistry
- Institutions: CIBA Pharmaceutical Company, Merck
- Thesis: Study of Dye and Ylide Formation in Salts of 9-p-dimethylaminophenyl) Fluorene.

Jeannette Elizabeth Brown (born May 13, 1934) is a retired American organic medicinal chemist, historian, and author.

== Life and education ==
Brown was born in 1934 in The Bronx, New York. According to Brown, when she was young, she contracted tuberculosis, and was treated by Arthur Logan. Logan was a young African-American in his intern year of residency, and lived in Brown's building. Brown's later inspiration to study science came from asking Logan how one could become a doctor. He replied, "Oh, you study science". Brown excelled in particular in chemistry, scoring 98 out of 100 on the New York State Regents chemistry exam. She attended New Dorp High School on Staten Island, and graduated in 1952. Brown earned her bachelor's degree in chemistry at Hunter College in 1956, one of two African Americans in the inaugural class of Hunter's chemistry program. In 1958, she became the first African American woman to achieve a master's degree from the University of Minnesota in organic chemistry. Her master's thesis was entitled "Study of Dye and Ylide Formation in Salts of 9-(p-dimethylaminophenyl) Fluorene."

== Chemical research ==
After receiving her master's degree, Brown began work as a research chemist at CIBA Pharmaceutical Company, where she was involved in research programs for drug development targeting tuberculosis and coccidiosis. She moved to Merck in 1969, where she co-authored 15 publications, obtained one patent and contributed to five others. Brown's work focused on synthesizing novel medicinal compounds. She worked to develop the compound cilastatin sodium. Cilastatin is an inhibitor of renal dehydropeptidase. Since the antibiotic, imipenem, is one such antibiotic that is hydrolyzed by dehydropeptidase, cilastatin is used in combination with imipenem to prevent its metabolism. This combination creates the antibiotic Primaxin (imipenem/cilastatin), which is used to treat severe internal infections, as well as diseases caused by flesh-eating bacteria and some types of pneumonia.

To succeed in industry, she believed that being an effective communicator, working on a team, and having a strong scientific education in an ever-changing field were essential.

== Outreach ==
Brown spent 36 years in research before she switched over to education. From 1993 to 2002 she was a visiting professor at the New Jersey Institute of Technology, where she also helped recruit black students to enter STEM fields and worked on science education issues in the state. It was here that she also tutored middle school and high school chemistry teachers. She won a grant from the Camille and Henry Dreyfus Foundation, which she put towards tutoring chemistry teachers. Brown has also devoted significant professional effort to diversity and outreach projects; she served on the National Science Foundation Committee on Equal Opportunities for Women Minorities and Persons with Disabilities and was the historian of the American Chemical Society's Women Chemist Committee. To this day, Brown continues to mentor both middle and high school students through the Freddie and Ada Brown Award. She founded this award in 2010 in honor of her parents.

== Work as historian ==
As a historian of science, Brown contributed seven biographical profiles of African American chemists to the African American National Biography Project, which included the first African American women to get their Ph.Ds in chemistry and chemical engineering. She is the author of the 2011 book African American Women Chemists, which profiles early African American women in chemistry. Her second book, African American Women Chemists in the Modern Era, focuses on contemporary women who have benefited from the Civil Rights Act and are now working as chemists or chemical engineers.

== Quotations ==
In an interview with the University of Minnesota, Brown advises young women entering the scientific fields to plow ahead despite the inevitable slights that will come their way. “You just got to keep going,” she said. “You can't stop. If you stop, you're not going to get what you want.”

“Go straight for a Ph.D. Do not stop at a master's degree,” she said. “If you're a Ph.D., then you're the boss.”

"I think working hard and learning new things keeps you young."

== Books ==
- African American Women Chemists in the Modern Era (2018)
- African-American Women Chemists (2011)

== Awards and honors ==
- 1991, elected to Hunter College Hall of Fame
- 2004, Société de Chimie Industrielle Fellow of the Chemical Heritage Foundation (American Section)
- 2005, Outstanding Achievement Award recipient, University of Minnesota
- 2005, National Award for Encouraging Disadvantaged Students into Careers in the Chemical Sciences recipient, American Chemical Society
- 2007, Association for Women in Science fellow
- 2009, Glenn E. & Barbara Hodson Ullyot Scholar of the Chemical Heritage Foundation
- 2009, American Chemical Society fellow in the Division of Professional Relations
- 2020, Henry Hill Award, American Chemical Society
