= Jessica Kairé =

Guatemalan artist

- Born: 1980 (age 45–46); Guatemala
- Education: Escuela Nacional de Artes Plásticas; Hunter College
- Known for: Sculpture; installation art performance art; video art
- Notable work: Confort Series; Así es la Vida en el Trópico; Oy!; Shiva; Can You Hear Me?; Tastings
- Style: Contemporary art

Jessica Kairé (born 1980) is a Guatemalan artist. She is based in New York and Guatemala.

== Early life ==
Jessica Kairé is a Jewish Guatemalan artist. She was born in 1980. Kairé moved to New York where she currently lives and continues to create art works. Kairé studied at Escuela Nacional de Artes Plásticas in Guatemala and at Hunter College in New York where she earned her Bachelor of Arts degree in 2010.

== Works ==
The Confort Series is a series of soft sculptures that represent various weapons.

Así es la Vida en el Trópico ("Such is the Life in The Tropics") is a series of instructional videos including one small sculpture in which Kairé demonstrates how to create weapons out of various tropical produce. The first video in the series shows the audience how to make nunchucks using two bananas and banana leaves to bind them together.

== Exhibitions ==
NuMu (Nuevo Museo De Arte Contemporáneo) is an egg-shaped kiosk repurposed by both Kairé and Stefan Benchoam that has been turned into a small museum that displays contemporary artworks in Guatemala City. The kiosk was used to sell eggs by its previous owner until Kairé rented it. NuMu was created to combat Guatemala's lack of contemporary art exhibitions.
