= Kim Hoeckele =

- Education: Georgia State University; Hunter College
- Known for: Multimedia, Photography
- Style: Research, observation, and aggregation
- Website: Kim Hoeckele

Kim Hoeckele is a multimedia artist living in New York, New York whose mediums include performance art, photography, found objects and video art.

== Early life and education ==
Hoeckele was born in Atlanta, Georgia in 1980. Hoeckele received her B.F.A. in Photography from Georgia State University and received her M.F.A. in studio art from Hunter College in New York, in 2012.

In June 2025, Hoeckele was a resident as part of the Image Text Workshop Residency at Cornell University.

Hoeckele is currently an Adjunct Assistant Professor at Columbia University, NYU, and Parsons School of Design.

Her work is in the permanent collection of the Museum of Contemporary Art of Georgia.

=== Themes ===
Hoeckele's work draws from appropriated images and found objects to construct work that quotes from and reconfigures male-dominant viewpoints carried through literary, art historical, and philosophical works of the Western Canon. Her performance work Rosy-Crimson stemmed from a close reading of the Ancient Greek epic poem The Odyssey. In Rosy-Crimson she appropriates recurring text that omits Odysseus, and rearranges it into a script experimentally performed by actors. In epoch, stage, shell, Hoeckele photographs her body as author and subject to perform sculptural poses for the camera, which are modeled from Greco-Roman ethnographic, art historical, and commercial images.

=== Selected exhibitions ===
- 2003 - Joy Cox and Kim Hoeckele, Saltworks Gallery, Atlanta, GA
- 2004 - So Atlanta, Atlanta Contemporary, Atlanta, GA
- 2007 - Kim Hoeckele, Quirk Gallery, Richmond, VA
- 2009 - MOCA GA Collects: The Photographic Image, MOCA, Atlanta, GA
- 2011 - Heat Island, SmackMellon Gallery, Brooklyn, NY
- 2012 - Shifting States, Hockney Gallery, London, UK
- 2013 - Amnesic, Family Business, New York, NY
- 2013 - For and About, Brooklyn Arts Council, Brooklyn, NY
- 2014 - DIVIDE, Pelham Arts Center, Pelham, NY
- 2016 - Rosy-Crimson, Nurture Art, Brooklyn, NY
- 2017 - Rosy-Crimson, Hercules Art, New York, NY
- 2018 - 2018 Queens International: Volumes, Queens Museum, Queens NY
- 2019 - Digital Déjà Vu, Spectral Lines, Queens, NY
- 2019 - At the Edge of the Universe, 2019 Pingyao Festival of Photography, Pingyao, CN
- 2019 - Crease, Underdonk, Brooklyn, NY
- 2019 - NADA Miami with Artfare
- 2020 - (forthcoming) epoch, stage, shell, CONTACT Photography Festival, Toronto, CA

=== Awards and residencies ===
- 2017 - Constance Saltonstall Foundation for the Arts Fellowship Residency, Ithaca, NY
- 2018 - Lighthouse Works Fellowship, Fishers Island, NY
- 2018 - Lower Manhattan Cultural Council Residency, New York, NY
- 2019 - AIM Program, Bronx Museum of the Arts, Bronx, NY

=== Publications and interviews ===
- 2004 - Fox, Catherine, “Focus on Photography,” Atlanta Journal Constitution, January 25, 2004, M3, Illus. Print.
- 2004 - Cullum, Jerry, “Home is Where the Art Is,” Atlanta Journal Constitution, April 18. 2004, M3. Print.
- 2004 - Oppenheim, Phil, “Atlanta, Georgia,” Art Papers, September/ October, 40. Print.
- 2007 - Young, Julie. “Art Under Glass,” Richmond Times-Dispatch, June 30, 2001. Print.
- 2011 - Hegart, Natalie, “Dog Days,” ArtSlant. N.P., July 3. 2011. Web.
- 2012 - Paige, Dominica, “The Unvanquished & the Unknown”, Conveyor Magazine, 2012, 54–57. illus. Print.
- 2012 - Camerona, Sadaf Rassoul and JOFF, “Water,” Capricious Volume II, Issue 13, 2012, 116–118. illus. Print.
- 2015 - a new nothing (in collaboration with Jon-Phillip Sheridan)
- 2018 - Moody, Thomas, “Queens International Continues To Grow,” The Queens Tribune, November 15, 2018. Illus. Print.
- 2019 - “Tea Salon with Lily Benson and Kim Hoeckele,” interviewed by Elizabeth Smolarz
- 2019 - Schmidt, Kyra, “Artist Feature: Kim Hoeckele,” Aint-Bad,
- 2019 - “Interview with Kim Hoeckele,” interviewed by conch.fyi,
- 2020 - PHROOM Artist Feature, 2020, Web.
