= Jennifer Raab =

American academic

President & Chief Executive Officer New York Stem Cell Foundation
- In office January 2024 – Present
- Preceded by: Derrick J. Rossi, PhD

Personal details
- Spouse: Michael Goodwin
- Children: Miranda Goodwin-Raab; Scott Goodwin (stepson)
- Education: Cornell University; Princeton University; Harvard Law School

Jennifer J. Raab is the President and chief executive officer of the New York Stem Cell Foundation, one of the world's leading nonprofit stem cell organizations with a mission to accelerate cures for the major diseases of our time through stem cell research. Prior to her appointment in January 2024, she served as the 13th president of Hunter College of the City University of New York, where she transformed the largest college in the City University of New York system into a model for public higher education nationwide. Raab was the longest serving president in the CUNY system, holding this position between June 2001 and June 2023. She was responsible for overseeing the functions of the college's more than one hundred undergraduate and postgraduate fields across five schools as well its affiliates such as the Hunter College High School, Hunter College Elementary School and Manhattan/Hunter Science High School.

== Education ==
A graduate of Hunter College High School, she was the first in her family to attend college. She is Jewish. Raab is a Phi Beta Kappa graduate of Cornell University, where she was accepted on early admission. She also holds a Master's in Public Affairs from Princeton University's Woodrow Wilson School of Public and International Affairs where she was a member of the Dean's Advisory Council. Raab received her J.D. degree cum laude from Harvard Law School.

== Career ==
Raab served for seven years as chairwoman of the New York City Landmarks Preservation Commission under Mayor Rudolph Giuliani. In a 1997 profile, The New York Times's David W. Dunlap said she had "developed some untraditional ideas about who belongs to the preservation community," adding that the changes – which could have been made "only by an outsider" – had greatly reduced the city's historic battling over preservation. She was head of the Landmarks Preservation Commission when it unanimously approved Norman Foster's plans for Hearst Tower in fall 2001. She also served on the Charter Revision Commission under Mayor Michael Bloomberg.

Previously, Raab worked for several years as a litigator at the law firms Cravath, Swaine & Moore and Paul, Weiss, Rifkind, Wharton & Garrison. She was also special projects manager for the South Bronx Development Organization and director of public affairs for the New York City Planning Commission.

She is a member of The Council on Foreign Relations and serves on the board of directors of The After School Corporation and on the Steering Committee of the Association for a Better New York. Mayor Giuliani appointed her president of Hunter College in 2001 amid controversy and accusations of intimidation of the board of trustees. The resistance to her appointment in the CUNY community stemmed from Raab's lack of doctoral degree (other than a Juris Doctor) and fundraising experience. The perceived "forcing through" of Raab prompted the Village Voice to declare CUNY "a patronage mill." In 2010 Raab received an 8% pay raise, bringing her salary to $254,652. That same year CUNY approved substantial increases in tuition.

After assuming the presidency in 2001, she led an effort to enlarge the Hunter College faculty and recruit distinguished professors and artists. Standards throughout the college were raised, and fiscal management modernized and strengthened. Entering SAT scores increased by 89 points in seven years and are now 137 points above the national average. Hunter has won new levels of government awards, private grants and philanthropic contributions and launched the first capital campaign in its history.

Raab has been credited with transforming Hunter College from an open-admissions institution to a selective, highly ranked college with a highly diverse student population that comprises one of America's largest cohorts of immigrant and first-generation students, including the most selective Macaulay Honors program in the City University system. Since she assumed the presidency, Hunter has significantly increased its grants and awards, and modernized and strengthened its fiscal management. Raab was responsible for securing an unprecedented $531 million in private philanthropic support for the college, the most successful fundraising in Hunter history, including a record $25 million gift by Toby and Leon G. Cooperman in 2013 and more recently a $52 million gift from Leonard Lauder. Other notable gifts during her tenure have been a $10 million from the Caravan Institute, the parent organization of Parliamo Italiano, to continue the legacy of the school, and $15 million from Klara and Larry Silverstein, president and chief executive of Silverstein Properties. The gift will fund the Klara and Larry Silverstein student success center on the seventh floor of Hunter's library and the renovation of the Hunter College Auditorium, which will serve as the New York Philharmonic's temporary home for three years. Other major changes include the renovation and reopening of the historic Franklin and Eleanor Roosevelt House, which is now the Public Policy Institute at Hunter College, and the construction of a $131 million home on Third Avenue and East 119 Street in East Harlem for Hunter's renowned Silberman School of Social Work that also housed the new CUNY School of Public Health. The CUNY School of Public Health has since moved to another building.

During Raab's tenure as president, Hunter College was included in The Princeton Review (2013) Best 378 Colleges and The Best 378 Colleges: 2014 Edition. Hunter ranked No. 1 in the category "Lots of Race/Class Interaction." Hunter College was also included in The Princeton Review's 2012 Best 376 Colleges. Hunter was ranked among The Princeton Review's Top 10 "Best Value" public colleges in the nation in 2010, 2011, and 2012. Hunter College was also ranked as #7 among Top Public Schools of North Regional Universities as well as #34 among Best Regional Universities in the North (public and private) in the U.S. News & World Report 2012 Best Colleges rankings, moving up 18 positions in four years.

Under Raab's leadership as president, Hunter College's Roosevelt House underwent a $24.5 million renovation, completed in 2010, and which is now the Roosevelt House Public Policy Institute. Roosevelt House, a landmarked double-townhouse on East 65th Street on Manhattan's Upper East Side, was the historic New York City home of Franklin and Eleanor Roosevelt and Franklin's mother, Sara Delano Roosevelt. After Sara's death in 1942, President Roosevelt was pleased to sell the House to Hunter College for use as a student center. An integral part of the college since 1943, the house has undergone an extensive renovation and re-opened in spring 2010 as the home of the Roosevelt House Public Policy Institute at Hunter College. The transformation of Roosevelt House into a state-of-the-art facility for the college provides the first living memorial to Franklin and Eleanor Roosevelt in New York City and an exciting opportunity to build on their far-reaching contributions to the nation and the world. The Roosevelt House Public Policy Institute is dedicated to innovative approaches to teaching, research, and public programming. Located in the heart of New York City, the institute provides a platform from which high quality scholarship effectively informs and influences public debate and public life. The building features two apartments, which Hunter offers to visiting scholars, as well as "great room" that can double as an auditorium. Raab was quoted as saying the renovation gave Hunter, a public university, "the kind of opportunity reserved for a private university."

Raab presided over the 2011 completion of a $131 million eight-story facility in East Harlem, which is now home to Hunter's Silberman School of Social Work. The School of Social Work was originally housed on East 79th Street, but was moved uptown in order to match the college's vision for the 21st century. The New York Times's Glenn Collins described the move as "a multiparty real estate deal of byzantine complexity." The Council On Education For Public Health (CEPH) voted to accredit the CUNY School of Public Health when it was a unit of Hunter College (but is a now a separate unit of CUNY).

In January 2012, it was announced Hunter College's graduate art school program will be moving to 95,000 square feet at 205 Hudson Street. Raab was quoted as saying, "We will be able to create a 21st century art school."

At a news conference on September 10, 2012, New York City Mayor Michael Bloomberg announced Hunter's new nursing, science, and health professions building to be built at 73rd Street and the East River in partnership with Memorial Sloan-Kettering Cancer Center, which is now under construction. Even with all Ms. Raab's successes, her management style was the subject of an article in The New York Times. The piece commented on Raab's appearance and was partly based on anonymous quotes, a practice the Times usually frowns upon. The piece and its timing were later regretted by the Times' Public Editor, Margaret Sullivan, who noted that Raab was being mentioned by supporters as a candidate for Chancellor of the City University system, a position that was opening up at the time. Sullivan suggested the article was unnecessarily "tough," "damaging," and sexist.

Raab is a supporter of the DREAM Act.

During the worldwide COVID-19 pandemic teachers at the Hunter College Campus Schools voted 96% no confidence in Raab or the administration's reopening plan, after the teachers were told to return to the classroom.

On December 5, 2022, Raab announced that she would be leaving her role as President of Hunter College at the end of June 2023. As of December 2022, Raab was the longest-serving President in the CUNY system.

Raab has had several opinion pieces published in the New York Daily News including op-eds on the need for increasing diversity in donor cell sources, Frances Perkins, legal challenges facing people with disabilities, and the importance of summer schooling. In a December 2025 New York Daily News op-ed, Raab, as CEO of NYSCF, highlighted the importance of scientific research to the New York economy and urged Mayor-elect Mamdani to invest in the life science sector to support job growth and to compensate for the federal government's retreat from funding. Raab has also contributed pieces to The Tablet and CNN.

== Awards ==
Raab was honored in 2002 with Hunter College High School's Distinguished Alumni Award.

Crain's New York Business named Raab as one of the "Most Powerful Women in New York" in 2007, 2009, 2011, and 2013.

The Kennedy Child Study Center presented Jennifer Raab with the 2013 Humanitarian Award for her dedication to education.

In March 2012, Raab received Albany Law School's Miriam M. Netter '72 Award at the School's 18th annual Kate Stoneman Day. In the same month Our Town honored Raab with an "Our Town Thanks You" award. That same year, Raab was a recipient of the 2012 Distinguished Leaders in Education Award by Education Update.

In 2011, Raab was awarded the Bella Abzug Award in memory of Hunter alumna Bella Abzug, class of 1942, at the third annual Bella and Bella Fella Awards. That same year, Raab was honored at the annual Martina Arroyo Foundation Gala.

In 2009, the United Way of New York City, Women United in Philanthropy honored Raab as a "Woman of Excellence and Achievement" Honoree.

Raab has also been honored by the League of Women Voters of New York, and she was the 2006 recipient of the Benjamin E. Mays Award from A Better Chance, awarded to "an educator whose principles of personal commitment, integrity, achievement and concern for others reflect those of Dr. Mays, the late President of Morehouse College."

In 2016, Raab was elected as a fellow to the American Academy of Arts & Sciences.

In 2016, Crain's New York Business included Raab and her husband Michael Goodwin on its inaugural Power Couples list.

In 2022, Raab received the Gold Honor Medal from the National Institute of Social Sciences for distinguished service to society and humanity.

Raab was named a Spring 2024 Hauser Leader. The Hauser Leaders Program at Harvard Kennedy School hosts high-profile leaders and practitioners from across public, nonprofit, and private sectors to teach skill-building and leadership development workshops, engage key external stakeholders, and advise students and alumni. Past Hauser Leaders include Former Prime Minister of New Zealand, Jacinda Ardern, Nicholas Kristof, Op-ed Columnist, The New York Times and Astronaut Ellen Ochoa.

== Personal life ==
Raab lives in Riverdale, NY with her family. She has been a resident of Fieldston in the Bronx. Television producer Jane Raab is her sister. Raab discussed her upbringing in a December 2024 profile in the Manhattan Jewish Sentinel.
