= Stephen M. Kravit =

American entertainment lawyer and film executive

- Born: Stephen M. Kravit; New York, United States
- Citizenship: United States
- Education: Hunter College (B.A.); Columbia Law School (LL.B.)
- Occupations: Entertainment lawyer Film executive
- Spouse: Shelly
- Children: 2
- Military career
- Allegiance: United States
- Branch: United States Army
- Rank: Captain
- Unit: Judge Advocate General's Corps

Stephen M. Kravit is an American entertainment lawyer and film executive. He has held senior business affairs positions at United Artists, Twentieth Century-Fox, Kings Road Entertainment, and The Gersh Agency, and has written and spoken on entertainment business affairs.

== Early life and education ==
Kravit was born in New York, the son of Isaac (“Al”), a fire marshal, and Celia Kravit. He had a brother Jesse, a dentist.

Kravit graduated from Hunter College and was a member of Phi Beta Kappa. He received an LL.B. from Columbia Law School.

== Military service ==
Kravit served for three years in the United States Army Judge Advocate General's Corps, attaining the rank of captain.

== Career ==
=== Embassy Pictures ===
After completing his military service, Kravit joined the legal staff of Embassy Pictures.

=== United Artists ===
On June 19, 1967, Kravit joined the legal department of United Artists. In 1970, he was appointed executive assistant to Herbert T. Schottenfeld, vice president and head of the UA legal department. In February 1975, at age 35, Kravit was elected vice president of United Artists Corp.

=== Twentieth Century-Fox ===
In 1978, Kravit joined Twentieth Century-Fox as vice president of business affairs. In 1981, he was promoted to senior vice president of business affairs. The promotion was announced by Leon S. Brachman.

=== Kings Road Entertainment ===
Kravit was executive vice president of Kings Road Entertainment.

=== The Gersh Agency ===
Kravit was executive vice president of business affairs at The Gersh Agency. He negotiated agreements involving motion pictures, television, and talent representation. In 2024, he became of counsel at the agency.

== Professional activities ==
Kravit wrote the chapter "Business Affairs" in The Movie Business Book, edited by Jason E. Squire. At the launch of the third edition of The Movie Business Book, the book's authors were asked what they considered the most important lesson they could impart about the business. According to The Hollywood Reporter, Kravit's response "was the one that seemed to most touch the audience as well as the authors": "One key word: passion. With passion, you will make the best movie you can. You must believe in your project and in yourself. Because the odds against you are so great, the only thing that can overcome them is passion."

Kravit was interviewed on The Movie Business Podcast, where he discussed entertainment dealmaking, business affairs, and his career in the motion picture industry.

Kravit also contributed to Hollywood Dealmaking: Negotiating Talent Agreements for Film, TV and New Media. Kravit served on the board of directors of the Association of Talent Agents and was a member of its negotiating committee during negotiations with the Writers Guild of America.

In 2025, Kravit was interviewed by Mike Gormley on The Mike Gormley Show, telling behind-the-scenes stories about the James Bond films, Paul McCartney, Dolly Parton and 9 to 5, the Chariots of Fire soundtrack deal, Rocky, and Dustin Hoffman and The Graduate.

In 1987, Kravit served on a 15-member advisory committee appointed by the Beverly Hills City Council to study funding for the Beverly Hills Unified School District. He authored a minority report recommending further study of alternative sources of funding.

== Personal life ==
Kravit is married to Shelley. Their first son was born on March 11, 1980, in Los Angeles.
