= Claire Seidl =

American abstract painter

- Born: 1951 (age 74–75)
- Education: Hunter College; Syracuse University
- Known for: Painting, photography, works on paper
- Style: Abstract
- Awards: New York Foundation for the Arts
- Website: Claire Seidl

Claire Seidl, The Big Picture, oil on canvas, 72" x 65", 2022.

Claire Seidl (born 1951) is an American artist known for her abstract oil paintings, works on paper and black-and-white photography. Critics place her within a lineage of gestural abstraction that extends from early modernism through abstract expressionism to contemporary artists that reintroduced allusions to nature into work that remained non-representational. Seidl's paintings are described as contemplative, searching and wide-ranging in terms of their mark-making, color palettes, surfaces and density, each of which she regulates to produce variations in mood, emotion, light and space. Her photographs are characterized as mysterious, moody and visually challenging due to her method of shooting film at night with low light and long exposures. Critic Karen Wilkin wrote of them, "Her images are so elusive that we question our perceptions, while we enjoy the subtle orchestration of tones and soft-edged shapes … Something similar obtains in Seidl’s paintings despite their abstractness: a sense of immanence, of the ungraspable, presented in assured, declarative terms."

Seidl's work has belonged to the art collections of the Aldrich Museum of Contemporary Art, Ogunquit Museum of American Art and Portland Museum of Art, among others. She has exhibited at those three institutions and at the Baker Museum, McNay Art Museum, Moscow Museum of Modern Art and Noyes Museum. Seidl is a member of American Abstract Artists and lives and works in New York City and Rangeley, Maine.

== Education and career ==
Seidl was born in 1951 and grew up in Connecticut. She received a BFA from Syracuse University in 1973 and moved to New York City subsequently, earning an MFA at Hunter College in 1982. She furthered her studies at London Polytechnic University and the International Center of Photography in New York. She taught painting and drawing at Hunter College from 1985 to 1995 and at Hofstra University from 2003 to 2007.

Seidl has had solo exhibitions at Stephen Rosenberg Gallery, Rosenberg + Kaufman Fine Art, Lesley Heller Gallery, The Painting Center, 1GAP Gallery, David Richard Gallery and Helm Contemporary in New York City, and Icon Contemporary Art and the Center for Maine Contemporary Art in Maine, among other venues. She appeared in the Center for Maine Contemporary Art Biennial (2010, 2016) and surveys including: "The Art of the 1970s and 1980s" (Aldrich Museum, 1985); "New Currents in Watercolor" (Noyes Museum, 1991); "New York: Then and Now" (Moscow Museum of Modern Art, 2011); "The Onward of Art" (2016); and "Blurring Boundaries: Women of the American Abstract Artists 1936–Present" (South Bend Museum of Art, 2019; Baker Museum, 2021).

== Work and reception ==
Stephen Westfall, among other critics, has identified Seidl's painting with a mode of organic abstraction that emerged in the 1980s and was also associated with loosely contemporaneous painters like Katherine Porter, Bill Jensen and Louise Fishman. This work alludes to nature and landscape, yet remains fully abstract, withholding direct reference or figuration. Art writers trace its roots—and Seidl's—to the nature-inspired iconography of Kandinsky and early American modernists such as Arthur Dove, Georgia O'Keeffe and John Marin, as well as to the gestural force and materiality of abstract expressionism. Although Seidl's paintings often reflect the movement, energy and rhythms of the natural world, they are regarded as most rooted in her state of mind during the moments of their creation.

Claire Seidl, The Eye of the Non-Combatant, oil on canvas, 64" x 82", 1996.

Seidl's connection to abstract expressionism comes to the fore in signature characteristics identified with her work: rhythmic all-over compositions, an ambiguous sense of knitted space, heterogeneous surfaces, and a varied and expressive, often lyrical sense of gesture. Tom McGlynn observed that although Seidl's approach is aligned with that movement's existential ideals of "presentness" and sincerity of experience, "her paintings are not history bound, but rooted in the perennial quest for a very personal gesture unbounded … Seidl utilizes and then reinterprets the syntax of abstract expressionism's 'big picture' calligraphics into a language all her own." Other writers note a highly singular quality to Seidl's individual works, with each painting bearing a distinctive atmosphere of color and type of mark "developed according to its own set of contingencies, taking on its own set of risks."

Seidl's intuitive mark-making is perhaps the most commented-upon aspect of her work. She creates distinct modes of expression through improvised gestures—alternately fluid, abrupt, aggressive or subtle—that she varies in rhythm, scale, speed and weight. Her application methods include both additive and reductive handling of paint: brushy veils of color, fields of brushstrokes that form optically and dimensionally shifting force fields, dry scraped shards, incised scratch-like marks, and aggressive wiping of pigment. Critics suggest this gestural range is matched by equally varied color combinations that include allusive and non-allusive hues, delicate pastels, sharp saturations, earth tones and moody monochromes, which regulate the paintings' emotional tone.

Reviewers identify a number of central themes in Seidl's work, despite the unequivocal abstractness of her painting. Among them are: looking and seeing, a point supported by the frequent use of "eye" in her paintings' often droll titles; the instability and imponderability of nature; the elusiveness of certainty; and contemplation of the reality of the self. According to Art in America critic Stephen Maine, "Seidl's paintings, with their blunted contours, blending chroma and reticulate brushwork, are all about flux, imminence and the mutating visual field." Time is an additional theme. It is expressed in her paintings materially through their recording of marks and gestures and of the lived experience of creating each work; in her photographs, time registers through the duration of her exposures and events captured, as well as through her multi-generational subjects and settings.

=== Paintings ===
Seidl's early paintings included geometric abstractions and compositions that bunched small, flame-like marks and suggested transitory natural phenomena. By the mid-to-latter 1980s, in four solo exhibitions at Stephen Rosenberg Gallery (between 1984 and 1990), she was producing paintings with a bolder and wider range of gesture and palette that explored less referential forms, non-allusive color, automatist-like drawing and outline. In the large horizontal canvas, The Eye of the Realist Is Inflatable (1986), for example, she employed thick, looping black line work to generate energetic movement across pastel forms and fields. In contrast, the paintings Mirror Mirror and True North (1988) combined teeming shapes, marks and colors to suggest frozen moments on the verge of crescendo.

Reviewers of Seidl's four solo exhibitions at Rosenberg + Kaufman Fine Art (1996–2004) noted a greater sense of freedom, fluidity and translucency in the work, resulting in surfaces that Dominique Nahas likened to a water line which the eye can skim over or plunge beneath. In these scaled-up paintings—often dominated by greens, ochres and umbers—Seidl played dry, brushy passages off liquid-like strokes, splashes and drips whose layers formed loose webs and thicket-like configurations in deep space (e.g., The Eye of the Non-Combatant, 1996). In canvases like Eye of the Glassblower (1996), Breathing Room (1998) and World of Good (2003), she created pictorial drama by combining watery and misty effects with wave-like gestures that suggested lights glimmering from murky depths.

Critics describe Seidl's approach to abstraction in her later work as spontaneous, forthright and complex, noting its rich sense of color, space, texture and light. She has continued to produce these variations in expression in large part through inventive paint handling that, between individual works, can move from scumbled lines and scrapes (e.g., The Swing of Things, 2013) to fluid, Twombly-esque calligraphy to surfaces seemingly excavated by palette knife-incised scratches (Here’s Your Hat, 2016). Reviewers of her solo exhibitions "Violets Are Blue" (2022, David Richard) and "Days Like These" (2025, Helm Contemporary) singled out paintings such as The Big Picture (2022) and Enough About Me (2023)—whose slashing, all-over fragments of line set against, respectively, pale reds and greens and multicolored earth tones—contrasting them with more deliberate works like It Don’t Mean a Thing (2022), which featured dry-brushed, vertically aligned black streaks over a bright yellow field.

Claire Seidl, Porch Dinner, Candlelight, photograph (silver gelatin, selenium-toned), 20" x 16" paper, 2023.

=== Photography ===
Seidl's black-and-white, silver gelatin-printed photographs have been described as "projecting a sense of classic structure, romanticism and mystery," haunting, and enigmatic. She typically records the images at night in low light, using long exposures. Seidl depicts scenes of domesticity and leisure located in cabins and around wooded lakeside property, often using windows to emphasize the tenuous divide between interior and exterior space (e.g., Stairway, 2002 or Studio, 2003). She places emphasis on seeing and perceiving by focusing on unremarkable, often ignored subjects: floorboards and corners of rooms, recently vacated dining tables, blurred figures, branches, shrubbery and the edges of woods, moonlight swimmers.

The long exposures render these commonplace scenes as both recognizable and perceptually disorienting, producing unusual streaks, blasts and shifts of light—among them, glowing spheres revealed to be people seated at a dinner table—and layered imagery that emerge naturally from recording (e..g., Porch Dinner, Candlelight, 2023). In Artillery, John Haber likened the "strangeness" of the images' intense light sources and brooding, crisp shadows to photograms; Stephen Maine compared their "apparitional quality" and emotional tone to the moody paintings of Albert Pinkham Ryder. The long exposures and subjects of the photographs register multiple time frames—the duration of capturing specific (and sometimes multiple) events, gaps between generations, the physical age of an old, worn house—reiterating key themes that recur throughout Seidl's work: memory, existential experience and materiality, as well as time.

== Collections and recognition ==
Seidl's work has been included in the collections of the Aldrich Museum of Contemporary Art, Bates College Museum of Art, Ewing Gallery of Art and Architecture, Maine Museum of Photographic Arts, Ogunquit Museum of American Art, Portland Museum of Art, University of New England, U.S. Department of State, and Zillman Art Museum at the University of Maine, among others.

She has been a member of American Abstract Artists since 2014.
