= AIDS Education and Prevention =

- Discipline: Public health
- Language: English
- Edited by: Francisco S. Sy

Publication details
- Publisher: Guilford Press
- Frequency: Bimonthly

Standard abbreviations
- ISO 4: AIDS Educ. Prev.

Indexing
- ISSN: 0899-9546 (print); 1943-2755 (web)

Links
- Journal homepage

AIDS Education and Prevention is a bimonthly peer-reviewed public health journal published by Guilford Press on behalf of the International Society for AIDS Education.

It covers education and prevention of AIDS, including epidemiological studies of risk behaviors. According to the Journal Citation Reports, the journal has a 2021 impact factor of 1.920.

The editor-in-chief is Francisco S. Sy (National Institute on Minority Health and Health Disparities).
