= Matthew Silver (performance artist) =

American performance artist

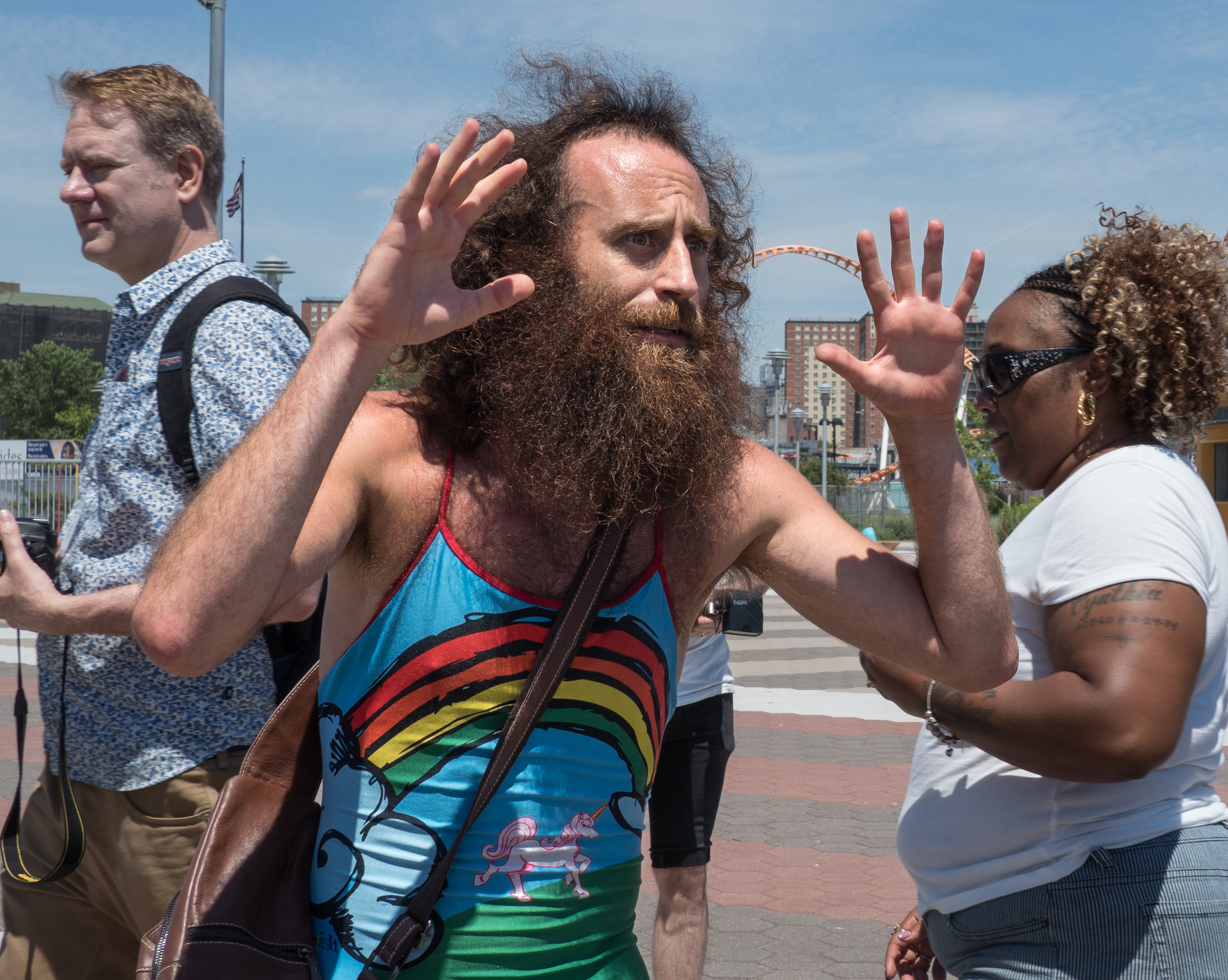
Matthew Silver at the Coney Island Mermaid Parade in 2018

Matthew Silver is a New York City-based street and venue performer.

== Early life ==
Matthew Silver was born in New Jersey.

== Notoriety and Career ==
Matthew Silver is described as "a man who runs around NYC in his underwear saying and doing radical things." Bushwick Daily states that "Silver’s stage presence is at one moment seemingly unrehearsed and ad hoc, yet his character is so well developed that you find yourself being pulled into his world, where nothing is too bizarre or over the top." He is listed on Know Your Meme. According to Rolling Stone, he started an art form called "looping". Silver described "looping" as "the experience of being on drugs, without being on drugs."

Silver has been described as spreading love and acceptance through unorthodox public displays. According to himself, he is interested in "getting people to use their hearts more than their brains." He has also said, "I like to make people feel awkward. It’s a vulnerable emotion."

On March 21, 2017, Silver was detained by security guards at the Alamo after he removed his pants to show bikini-style underwear covered in red hearts, rode a stick pony, and swung a rubber chicken above his head. When the police arrived, they determined Silver had not done anything illegal and could not be arrested.

In 2021, Crackhead Barney expressed dismay at Silver being more famous.

Silver was known at one point as "The Man In The White Dress."

Silver currently runs workshops and comedy showcases in New York City on the art of avant-garde clowning. His weekly performance revue The Idiots Hour has attracted performers including Tallie Medel and Riley Soloner.
