= Daniel Ravner =

Israeli writer

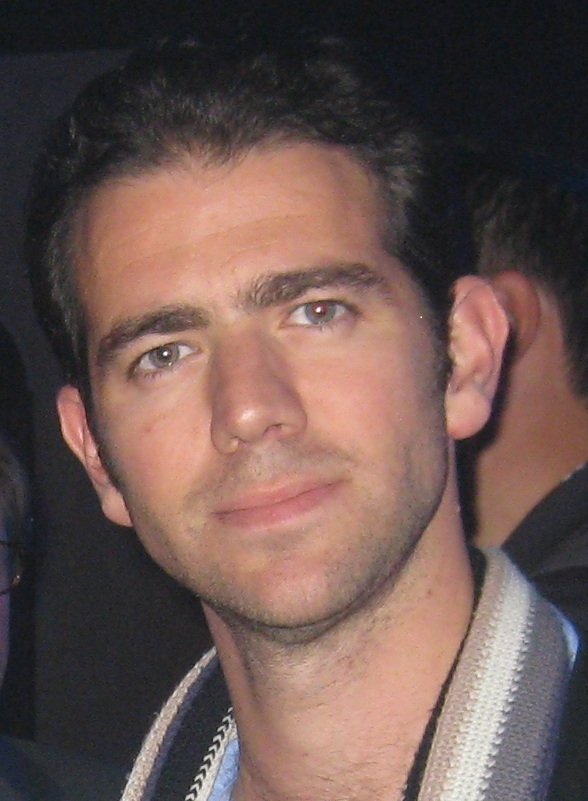
Daniel Ravner

Daniel Ravner (Hebrew: דניאל רבנר; born April 1, 1976) is an Israeli writer, speaker, and cross media creator. He is known for his work on Israeli television and blogging on crossmedia and internet trends. In March 2017, Ravner launched his startup news site "The Perspective", which offers his readers contradicting point of view analysis of current affairs.

== Biography ==
Daniel Ravner was born and raised in Ramla, Israel. He went to Ramla Lod High School and left Israel for Paris and later New York in 1998. He returned to Israel in 2004 and works mainly from Tel Aviv. In 2010, Ravner won a fellowship for the Entertainment Master Class – an international education program. In 2008, he earned a BA in Film and Theater in New York City. He interned at MTV networks, earned the "W. Eaton award for excellence in playwriting" and also won the IFC's sponsored Festeyeful "Best of Festival award" for his short film The Art of Talking to Girls. In 2013, Ravner completed a business strategy MBA degree at Ono Academic College.

== Media and business career ==
Among his projects are TV by the People (first ever crowd sourced TV format), The Architect (Israel first ARG), RGE's Springboard and other cross media projects for the likes of P&G, FOX international Channels, ProSieben's Red Arrow, 3M and many more.

In March 2012, Ravner was named one of "40 most promising people under 40 in the Israeli business world" by the Israeli business magazine Globes. He is currently the CEO of Practical Innovation, a cross media strategy and implementation firm.

Ravner served as head of the Digital division at Armoza Formats, head of content at The Box and creative director of Screenz (a cross media joint venture of The Box and Keshet international).

Prior to his position at THE BOX, Ravner wrote for prime time Israeli Television (channel 2 and 10) and worked as associate story editor on Channel 10's prime time show The Sing. He was also as artistic manager of "Smallbama" – theater festival, and wrote the nationally toured comedic play The Chat and its Punishment

== The Perspective ==
During 2016 Ravner started to develop his next venture The Perspective, a site that offers its readers to consider current events, from two opposing points of view. The site launched in March 2017, following a successful seed investment of $550,000. In 2019, Ravner was one of the contributors to the book "Digitized: Industry Transformation and Disruption through Entrepreneurship and Innovation", that deals with the digitizing process of various industries, by way of presenting different test cases and what can be learned from them. Ravner's chapters portray his startup "The Perspective". Awards include:

2017 WebAward: News category

2017 Editors and Publishers Eppy Award for Best Innovation Project

2018 The Drum Award for Best Editorial Innovation – Highly Commended Finalist

In September 2021, Daniel published The Perspective's first book, titled What The Hell Are They Thinking? This book is a collection of 100 hotly debated topics that govern readers' lives and covers politics and government, economics, popular culture, sports, health, religion and more. The book features The Perspective website's most popular, most engaged-with "Big Debates," especially updated for this book—with 30 new debates added exclusively for the book's release. These debates were written in a way that tells both sides of every story. Awards include:

2022 Independent Press Award WINNER in the category of Current Affairs.

2022 Nonfiction Book Awards Gold Winner

== Blogging ==
Ravner has a professional blog covering original new media content and TV/WEB relationship. Articles from the blog constantly reappear in other publications. He also holds lectures worldwide on the subject of New and Cross media and workshops on transmedia and new media content in various academic institutions.
