= DJ Ricardo! =

Puerto Rican-American DJ and producer

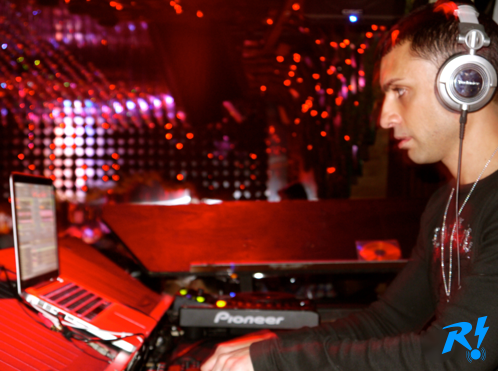
- DJ Ricardo! djing at Greenhouse Night Club in New York City, Feb 16 2013

Background information
- Born: Ricardo Torres Ortiz; Mayagüez, Puerto Rico
- Origin: New York City
- Genres: Disco, Electro, Electronic, Latin house, Dutch House, Minimal techno, Progressive house, Rock, Tech house, Tribal house, Trance, Ambient, Downtempo, Deep House, Big Room House, Lounge
- Occupation(s): DJ, producer
- Instrument(s): Turntable, Sampler
- Labels: Ultra
- Website: www.djricardonyc.com

DJ Ricardo! is a Puerto Rican-American DJ and producer. He is best known for conceptualizing, compiling, editing, and mixing the first annual mixed dance compilation series on Ultra Records, known as the DJ Ricardo! Presents: Out.Anthems, in celebration of Gay Pride Month.

== Discography ==
=== Mixed compilations ===
- 2005: Ultra. Dance Mexico (album) Ultra Dance
- 2006: DJ Ricardo! Presents Out.Anthems
- 2007: DJ Ricardo! Presents Out.Anthems 2
- 2008: DJ Ricardo! Presents Out.Anthems 3
- 2009: DJ Ricardo! Presents Out. Anthems 4
- 2009: Cuba Con Leche
- 2010: DJ Ricardo! Presents Out. Anthems 5
- 2011: DJ Ricardo! Presents Out. Anthems 6
- 2012: DJ Ricardo! Presents Out. Anthems 7
- 2013: DJ Ricardo! Presents Out. Anthems 8
