= Hunter College Elementary School =

Elementary school in New York City

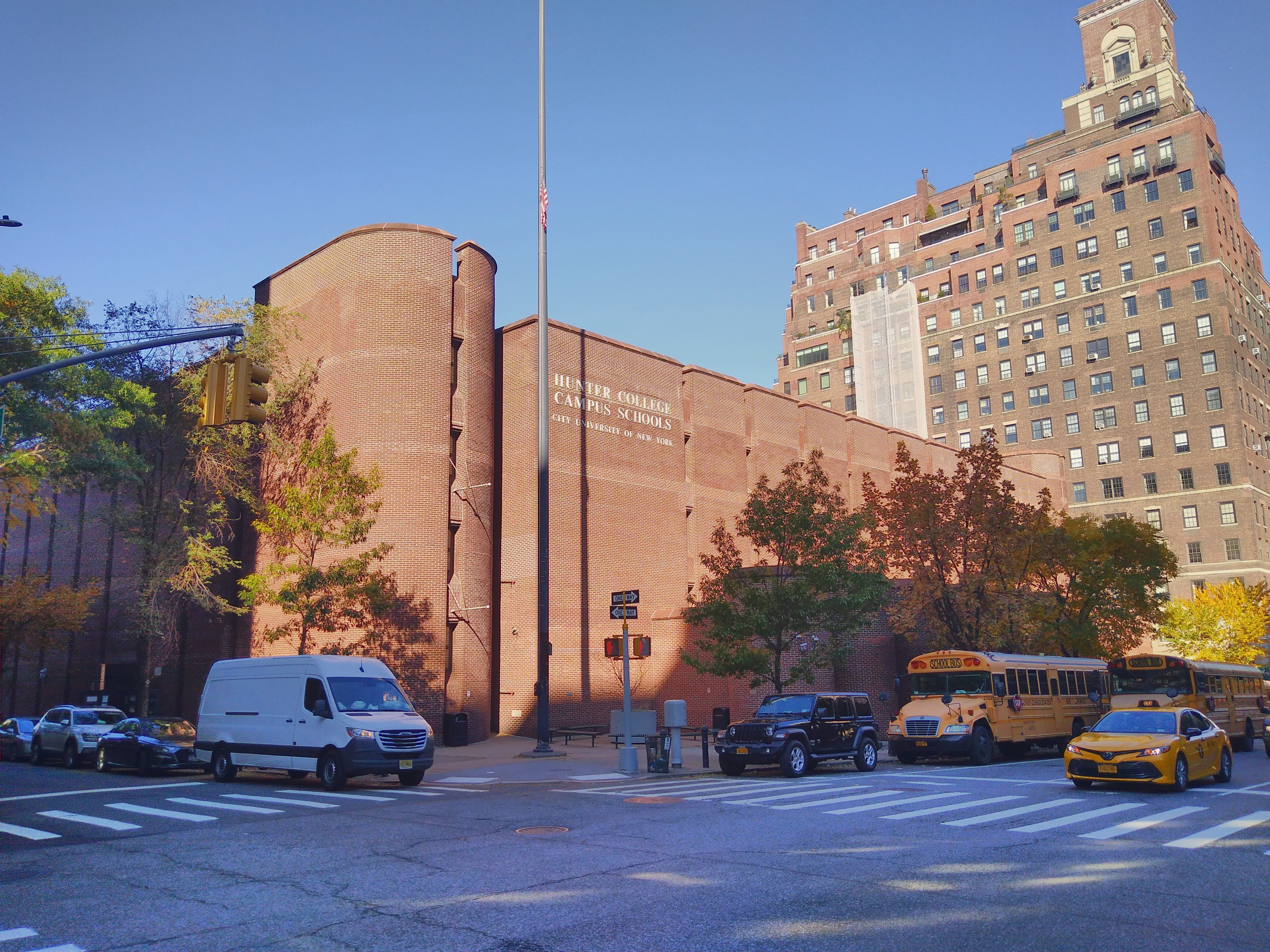
- Exterior of Hunter College Elementary School, shared with Hunter College High School

Location
- 71 East 94th Street; New York City, New York 10128; United States; 40°47′09″N 73°57′15″W

Information
- Type: Public
- Motto: Mihi Cura Futuri (The care of the future is mine.)
- Established: 1940; 86 years ago
- Oversight: Hunter College
- Grades: K–6
- Campus type: Urban
- Colors: Purple, gold, and white
- Athletics conference: PSAL

Hunter College Elementary School is an elementary school on Manhattan's Upper East Side for select students who reside in New York City. It is administered by Hunter College, a senior college of the City University of New York or CUNY.

== History ==
Hunter College Elementary School was created in 1940 as an experimental school for gifted students. It grew out of the Hunter College Model School and assumed its current name in 1941. From its inception until 1973, Hunter College Elementary School was located at the Hunter College campus at 68th Street and Lexington Avenue. Its current location is the former site of the Squadron A Armory at 71 East 94th Street in New York City.

In 1964, the school began looking to admit additional Black students; previously the student body was predominantly white. Applicants have historically been selected based on the results of an intelligence test. According to The New York Times in 1990, there were 16 nursery-school students and 32 kindergarten students in each year's incoming class. There were about 25 times as many applicants as available seats in each class. According to The New York Times in 2009, there were more than 1,800 applicants for an incoming class of 50 students. After students underwent one round of testing, about 200 applicants were invited to visit the school.

Students from the elementary school generally continue from Kindergarten to 6th grade, and then (through affiliated Hunter College High School, located in the same building) through 12th grade. The Wall Street Journal published a study in 2007 that showed Hunter to be among the top 20 feeder schools to top universities in the United States, and the only public school listed in the top 20.

== Notable alumni ==
- Alex Alben, technology executive and author
- Ron Brown, former U.S. Secretary of Commerce
- Adam Cohen, scientist and professor at Harvard University
- Bran Ferren, inventor
- Roy M. Goodman, former New York State Senator
- Elena Kagan, U.S. Supreme Court justice
- Margaret Lefranc, former painter
- Robert Lopez, songwriter, EGOT winner
- Fred Melamed, actor, comedian, and writer
- Lin-Manuel Miranda, composer, producer, actor
- Cynthia Nixon, actress and political activist
- Jonathan Tunick, orchestrator and musical director; EGOT winner
- Hugh David Politzer, 2004 Nobel Prize winner in Physics

== See also ==
- Hunter College
- Hunter College High School
