= Vishwa Adluri =

Indian philosopher

Vishwa Adluri specializes in Indian philosophy. He is a strong critic of the academic discipline of Indology in Germany.

== Education ==
Adluri enrolled for a PhD under the supervision of Michael Hahn, Professor of Indology and Tibetology at the University of Marburg but was failed. He responded by accusing Hahn's scholarship of having Nazi leanings, notwithstanding Hahn's Jewish heritage. The university reconstituted the dissertation committee—without any German Indologists—and Adluri was awarded the doctorate. (Note: Hahn criticized the reconstitution, arguing that it amounted to eliminating potential dissenters from the evaluation process.)

== Scholarship ==
=== Greek Philosophy ===
Adluri approaches ancient Greek philosophy, especially Parmenides and Plato, as a meditation on mortal existence rather than on timeless metaphysics. In his book Parmenides, Plato and Mortal Philosophy: Return from Transcendence, he draws on Heidegger, Schürmann, Nietzsche, Arendt and related twentieth-century critiques of metaphysical abstraction to read Parmenides' poetry as a reflection on the mortal thumos, bound to birth and death, as it aspires to transcendence but ultimately must return to finite, “radically individual” existence. Adluri argues that Socratic mortality and singularity overshadow purely metaphysical interpretations of the soul’s ascent, challenging Derridean deconstruction and emphasizing the embodied, finite human at the center of Greek thought.

=== Indology ===
Adluri has been a fervent critic of, what he calls, "German Indology". He accuses the development of the thought-school to be intrinsically tied with Nazism and asserts that "German Indologists" continue to service the Nazi causes. In 2016, he co-authored The Nay Science: A History of German Indology, which was published by Oxford University Press.

==== Reception ====
Hans Harder, Angelika Malinar and Thomas Oberlies, in a 2011 editorial for Zeitschrift für Indologie und Südasienstudien on combating "discrimination, racism and sexism", noted that Adluri's works engaged in polemics against multiple German scholars under the veneer of probing ideological orientations of scholarship. Jürgen Hanneder mounted a detailed critique of Adluri's scholarship, the same year. The Nay Science was subject to scathing critiques by Eli Franco, Jürgen Hanneder, and Bharani Kollipara. However, Garry W. Trompf praised it as an "extraordinary work"; so did Eric Kurlander and Nicholas A. Germana.

== Bibliography ==
- Initiation into the Mysteries: The experience of the irrational in Plato, 2006, Mouseion: Journal of the Classical Association of Canada.
- When the Goddess Was a Woman: Mahabharata Ethnographies.
- Parmenides, Plato and Mortal Philosophy: Return from Transcendence, 2011, Continuum International.
- Reading the Fifth Veda: Studies on the Mahabharata, 2011, Brill.
- Modernity and Plato: Two Paradigms of Rationality, 2012, with Arbogast Schmitt, Camden House.
- Philosophy and Salvation in Greek Religion, 2013, De Gruyter.
- The Nay Science: A History of German Indology, 2014, Oxford University Press.
- Argument and Design: The Unity of the Mahābhārata, 2016, Brill.
- Philology and Criticism: A Guide to Mahābhārata Textual Criticism, 2018, Anthem Press.
