= Hunter College High School =

Public school in New York City

Coordinates: 40°47′8.92″N 73°57′14.04″W

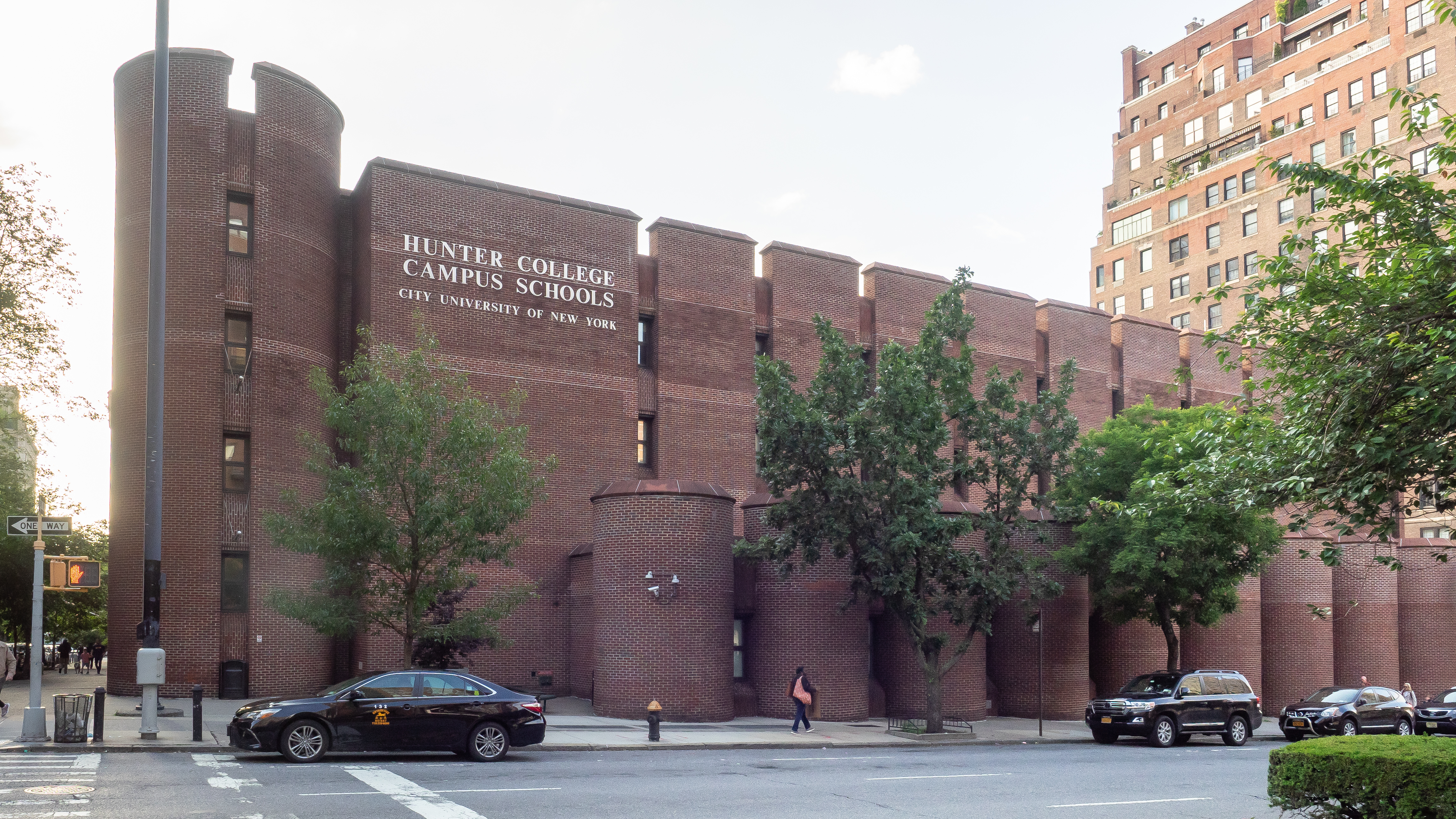
- Hunter College High School in 2019

Location
- 71 East 94th Street; New York City, New York 10128; United States

Information
- Type: Public, Selective Magnet
- Motto: Mihi Cura Futuri (The care of the future is mine.)
- Established: 1869
- Oversight: Hunter College
- Principal: Tony Fisher
- Faculty: 87
- Grades: 7–12
- Enrollment: approx. 1,200
- Student to teacher ratio: 13:1
- Campus type: Urban
- Colors: Home: Purple , Gold Away: White
- Athletics conference: PSAL
- Team name: Hawks
- Accreditation: MSA
- Newspaper: What's What, The Observer
- Yearbook: Annals
- Feeder schools: Hunter College Elementary
- Website: www.hunterschools.org/page/high-school

Hunter College High School is a public academic magnet secondary school located in the Carnegie Hill section of the Upper East Side of Manhattan. It is administered and funded by Hunter College of the City University of New York (CUNY) and no tuition is charged. According to Hunter, its 1,200 "students represent the top one-quarter of 1% of students in New York City, based on test scores."

== History ==
=== 19th century ===
Hunter was established in 1869 as "The Female Normal and High School", a private school to prepare young women to become teachers. The original school was composed of an elementary and a high school. A kindergarten was added in 1887, and in 1888, the school was incorporated into a college.

=== 20th and 21st centuries ===
The high school was separated from what would become Hunter College in 1903. In 1914, both schools were named after the Female Normal School's first president, Thomas Hunter. The school was almost closed by Hunter College President Jacqueline Wexler in the early 1970s.

Hunter was an all-girls school for its first 105 years, with the official name "Hunter College High School for Intellectually Gifted Young Ladies". The prototypical Hunter girl was the subject of the song Sarah Maria Jones, who, the lyrics told, had "Hunter in her bones." In 1878, Harper's Magazine published an approving article about the then-new school:

The first thing to excite our wonder and admiration was the number – there were 1,542 pupils; the second thing was the earnestness of the discipline; and the third was the suggestiveness of so many girls at work in assembly, with their own education as the primary aim, and the education of countless thousands of others as the final aim, of their toil.

Girls all the way from fourteen to twenty years of age, from the farther edge of childhood to the farther limit of maidenhood; girls with every shade of complexion and degree of beauty; girls in such variety that it was amazing to contemplate the reduction of their individuality to the simple uniformity of their well-drilled movements. The catholicity and toleration crystallized in the country's Constitution prevail in the college: about two hundred of the students are Jewesses, and a black face, framed in curly African hair, may occasionally be seen.

The aim of the entire course through which the Normal students pass is not so much to burden the mind with facts as it is to develop intellectual power, cultivate judgment, and enable the graduates to take trained ability into the world with them.

The school began admitting boys in 1974 as a result of a lawsuit by Hunter College Elementary School parents, a development which was described in the New York Daily News with the headline "Girlie High Gets 1st Freshboys." In January 1982, the school was featured in a New York Magazine article entitled "The Joyful Elite." Hunter was the subject of the 1992 book Hunter College Campus Schools for the Gifted: The Challenge of Equity and Excellence published by Teachers' College Press.

The high school has occupied a number of buildings throughout its history, including one at the East 68th Street campus of the college (1940–1970). For several years in the 1970s, it was housed on the 13th and 14th floors of an office building at 466 Lexington Avenue (at East 46th Street), the current location of what is now known as the Park Avenue Atrium.

Since 1977, the school has occupied the former site of the Madison Avenue Armory at East 94th Street between Park and Madison Avenues on the Upper East Side. Although most of the armory building was demolished, the armory's façade, including two empty towers, was left partly standing on Madison Avenue. The school building itself, which faces Park Avenue, was constructed to resemble the armory. Because of its unusual design, including many classrooms without windows and the rest with only narrow windows, Hunter is called "The Brick Prison." The building contains both the high school (grades 7–12) and the elementary school (K-6), which are collectively known as the Hunter College Campus Schools.

== Admissions ==
Admission to Hunter College High School is selective, only being open to seventh-grade students, with the admission process consisting of two steps. Students from the five boroughs of New York City with high scores on their fifth-grade standardized tests are eligible to take the entrance exam during their sixth-grade school year. To qualify, public school students must score in the 90th percentile or above on both the New York State reading and math tests, while private and parochial school students must score in the 90th percentile or above (in both reading and math) compared to all private school students nationwide. This results in approximately 2,500– or fewer than 4%— of New York City's 65,000 fifth graders being eligible to take the test. From those, around 182 to 185 students are offered admission, representing "the top one-quarter of 1% of students in New York City, based on test scores."

The only other pathway to the High School is through the elementary school, to which 50 students are admitted to kindergarten after taking an IQ test and being interviewed. The kindergarten admission process is the sole entrance route to the elementary school. Approximately 45 students from Hunter College Elementary School enter the seventh-grade class each year. Starting from the 2010–2011 school year, elementary school students must demonstrate "satisfactory progress" by fifth grade in order to gain admission to the high school, whereas previously, they were guaranteed admission.

In total, an entering 7th grade class contains approximately 225 students, known as "Hunterites," about 200 of whom will graduate from the school. The total enrollment from grades 7 through 12 is approximately 1,200 students.

=== Concerns about admission policies ===
Author and alumnus Chris Hayes stated in Twilight of the Elites: America After Meritocracy that the school's sole reliance on the one test for admissions reproduces societal inequalities – that students whose families cannot afford intensive test prep courses are less likely to earn competitive scores on the entrance exam. In recent years, underrepresentation of African-Americans among students admitted to the school, compared to their numbers in the public school system, has increased. Hayes quotes Hunter College High School's 2010 graduate Justin Hudson's commencement speech:

If you truly believe that the demographics of Hunter represent the distribution of intelligence in this city, then you must believe that the Upper West Side, Bayside and Flushing are intrinsically more intelligent than the South Bronx, Bedford–Stuyvesant and Washington Heights, and I refuse to accept that.

Because of its relatively small size, and because the school is run by Hunter College rather than by the city's education department, Hunter has largely avoided being caught up in the debate over diversity at the specialized high schools in New York City. However, some alumni and students have expressed concern about the lack of diversity at the school, where only 6.3 percent of the student body is Hispanic and 2.2 percent African-American (67% of NYC public school children are black or Hispanic). On the other hand, while Asians make up 16.2% of NYC public-school children, they make up 49.4% of the student body at the school, based on New York City Department of Education data.

== Academics ==
The Wall Street Journal ranked Hunter as the top public school in the United States and noted that it is a feeder to Ivy League and other elite colleges. Worth likewise ranked Hunter as the top public school in the country. The New York Times called Hunter "the prestigious Upper East Side school known for its Ivy League-bound students" and "the fast track to law, medicine and academia." Publicly available data indicate that Hunter has both the highest average SAT score and the highest average ACT score of any school in the United States, public or private, though complete data is needed to be conclusive.

Students admitted in 7th grade pursue a six year course of study, whereas elementary students go through 13 years at Hunter. Hunter is a college preparatory high school that provides a liberal arts education. The majority of subjects are accelerated such that high school study begins in the 8th grade and state educational requirements are completed in the 11th. During the 12th grade, students take electives, have the option to attend courses at Hunter College (for transferable credit), undertake independent academic studies, and participate in internships around the city.

Students in grades 7 and 8 are required to take courses in communications and theater (a curriculum that includes drama, storytelling, and theater). Students in grades 7–9 must take both art and music, each for half a year, and then choose one to take in tenth grade. One of the four available foreign language courses (French, Latin, Mandarin, or Spanish) must be taken each year in grades 7–10, and Advanced Placement (AP) language electives are offered through the 12th grade. A year each of biology, chemistry, and physics must be completed in addition to the introductory science classes of life science and physical science in the 7th and 8th grades, respectively. During 7th and 8th grades, students must also participate in the school's science fair; the fair is optional for older students. After the introductory 7th grade social studies course, 4 semesters of global studies (8th-9th grades) and 2 semesters of American history (10th grade) are followed by 2 semesters of 20th century history (11th grade). A series of English and mathematics courses are taught from 7th through 11th grades. (The math curriculum is split into a track of "honors" and a track of "extended honors" classes for students of different strengths after 7th grade, with 8H and 8E classes based on 7th grade math class averages and the placement test taken in 7th grade). Two semesters of physical education are taught each year, including swimming in the 8th grade (held at Hunter College). In 9th grade, students are required to take a CPR course for one semester and a computer science course the other semester. Starting in their junior year, students are allowed to take a limited number of electives and AP courses. The senior year, however, is free of mandated courses except for a year of physical education electives and courses to fulfill leftover educational requirements.

Hunter's English Department incorporates reading novels and writing analytical papers beginning in the 7th grade. Students have historically graduated with strong writing and reading comprehension skills, reflected by the school's high average SAT scores in critical reading and writing, and by the number of students who have earned recognition by the Scholastic Writing Awards.

Upper-level electives and AP courses are offered by all six academic departments. AP courses include: AP Computer Science, AP Calculus AB and BC, AP Microeconomics and AP Macroeconomics, AP European History, AP Chemistry, AP Physics C, AP Biology, AP Statistics, AP Spanish, AP French, AP Mandarin, and AP Latin (Virgil). The English Department previously offered AP English and Literature but has since replaced it with the elective Advanced Essay Writing. Other electives include: Introduction to African-American Studies, "Race, Class, and Gender", International Relations, US Constitutional Law, Classical Mythology, Photography, Astrophysics, Advanced Art History I & II, Organic Chemistry, Creative Writing, Joyce's Ulysses, Shakespeare's Comedies and Romance/Shakespeare's Tragedies and Histories, and Physiology. Hunter's AP offerings are currently being evaluated by the Faculty and Curriculum Committee. The class of 2013 took 366 AP tests (≈1.8 per student) with an average score of 4.5.

There were 87 faculty members in 2013. 89% had advanced degrees. Many teachers are scientists, writers, artists, and musicians. Many come to Hunter with university-level teaching experience. The student/faculty ratio is 13:1, much lower than the city's other selective public schools (e.g. Stuyvesant = 22:1; Bronx Science = 21:1; Brooklyn Tech = 21:1).

Nearly 99% of Hunter's classes of 2002 through 2005 went directly to college, and about 25% of these students accepted admission into an Ivy League school. Worth reported that 9.4% of Hunter's classes of 1998 through 2001 attended Harvard, Yale or Princeton (the highest rate of any public school in the United States).

In the graduating class of 2015, out of about 190 students, Hunter received 89 total acceptances from the Ivy League, and ultimately, 56 students (≈30%) matriculated into one of the eight Ivy League schools. There are six guidance counselors serving the student population. Each junior and senior is assigned a college guidance counselor.

Hunter students win many honors and awards during their high school careers, including numerous scholastic writing awards. Hunter wins approximately 23% of all New York State Scholastic Art and Writing Awards. 74 members of the Class of 2013 (38%) were National Merit or National Achievement Scholarship Semifinalists. Of particular fame are the winners of the Regeneron Science Talent Search (formerly Intel and Westinghouse STS), of which Hunter has had four: Amy Reichel in 1981, Adam Cohen ('97, now a professor in the Chemistry and Physics Departments at Harvard) in 1997, David L.V. Bauer ('05) in 2005, and Benjy Firester ('18) in 2018.

Publicly available data indicate that Hunter has both the highest average SAT score and the highest average ACT score of any school in the United States, public or private, though complete data is needed to be conclusive. For the graduating class of 2012, the average SAT score was a 2207. The class of 2013 averaged 2200 on the test and the class of 2016 averaged 2208. The class of 2013 scored an average of 32.6 on the ACT.

== Extracurricular activities ==
Clubs are diverse in their topics, and include politics, film, music, linguistics, and knitting. Clubs and organizations at Hunter are all student-run, with faculty members as advisers. During club open house, members of the student body have the opportunity to spend their lunch time meeting representatives of clubs.

=== Sports ===
Hunter has many available sports, including cross-country (boys' and girls' varsity and junior varsity), soccer (boys' varsity, junior varsity and middle school and girls' varsity and middle school), swimming (boys' and girls' varsity), volleyball (boys' varsity and girls' varsity, junior varsity and middle school), golf (coed and girls' varsity), basketball (boys have two middle school teams, one junior varsity team, and one varsity team, while the girls' have two middle school and one varsity team), indoor track (boys' and girls' varsity, middle school, and recently it was extended to the elementary school as well), outdoor track (boys' and girls' varsity, middle school and elementary), baseball (boys' middle school and varsity), softball (girls' middle school and varsity), lacrosse (boys' and girls' varsity and junior varsity), tennis (boys' and girls' varsity), ultimate (boys' and girls' varsity), bowling (Co-Ed varsity), fencing (boys' and girls' varsity), badminton (boys' and girls' varsity), handball (coed varsity), and wrestling (boys' and girls' varsity and co-ed middle school).

Many teams are called "Hunter Hawks" because the school mascot is a hawk.

In the winter of 2006, the boys' fencing team won the PSAL city championship for the second year in a row, beating rival school Stuyvesant in the finals. It has since captured the silver medal in winter 2008, losing to Stuyvesant in the final, and the bronze medal in winter 09, again losing to Stuyvesant, after beating them twice during an undefeated regular season to win the division championship. It proceeded win the city championship again in 2011, followed by bronze in 2012, and silver in 2013. Following another undefeated season, the team took first place in 2014, winning in a single-touch tie-breaker against rival Brooklyn Technical High School.

In the 2009–2014 seasons, the Girls' Varsity Fencing Team won five consecutive PSAL championships.

In 2011, both the Boys' and Girls' varsity lacrosse teams won the PSAL Bowl Division Championships. In 2013 Boys' Lacrosse won the City Championship against Tottenville. That season, prior to winning the City Championship, they were ranked third overall among all city schools, both public and private (after first-ranked Dalton and second-ranked Tottenville).

In the 2012 season, the Boys' Middle School Soccer Team were the Citywide PSAL Champions winning the finals against Salk.

In the 2016 season, the Girls' varsity golf team won the citywide PSAL championship, defeating Bronx Science High School 5–0 in the finals. The team went on to win the city championship in the 2017 and 2018 seasons as well, capturing the title for three years in a row. In the 2021 season, the Girls' Varsity Golf team won the citywide PSAL Championship by defeating Staten Island Technical High School 3–2 in the final.

== School events and traditions ==
Students at Hunter can attend social events sponsored by the school administration, faculty and the student-run General Organization (G.O.). These include:

- Seventh Grade Picnic: an orientation and welcoming event held in Central Park at the end of September.
- Spirit Week: a week in October in which each day consists of activities centered around a "theme" (e.g. retro) as designated by the G.O. It was created in the 1990s as a replacement for a spring "Field Day", which was once organized by the Athletic Association.
  - Spirit Day: A Spirit Week event in which the entire high school community takes buses to Bear Mountain. Activities typically include a football game between teams composed of juniors and seniors, respectively; a bike trip to and from Bear Mountain; and a hike.
- Homecoming: a day in which the previous year's graduates return to the school to revisit current students in December. There is usually a basketball game on this day.
- G.O. Breakfast: a morning prior to midterms in which the G.O. organizes a breakfast of donuts, coffee, and hot cocoa outside the G.O. Office.
- Senior Walkout: carried out on the first day of snowfall. Seniors leave class for the day to engage in snowball fights or pursue other activities outside of the school with parents of seniors providing refreshments. Originally an act of rebellion, in recent years the event has become a school-sanctioned ritual and is done in consultation with the administration.
- Carnival: an end-of-year event. It usually has a theme, live and recorded music, and stalls run by school clubs.
- Senior Week: traditionally the week after Carnival and before graduation. During this week, there are events designed to say goodbye to the graduating seniors.
  - Senior Tea: A Senior Week event in which the senior class groups into their seventh grade class sections to reflect upon their time at Hunter. Faculty members typically join Senior Tea as well.
- "Intel Trip": A trip run by the Hunter Science department that takes students to Washington D.C. to view Intel Science Project finalists and sightseeing in surrounding areas.

Several formal dances are arranged throughout the year:

- Prom is a similar event to many proms held all across the United States, consisting of formal dress and a sit-down dinner. The event is usually followed by an after-party at a student's house. In June 2001, Prom was held at the World Trade Center (Windows on the World). Prom is held on a Thursday evening. Attendees return to school on Friday in their finery so students and teachers can admire their glamorous outfits.
- Semi-formal is the "junior prom," held for eleventh graders in the spring.
- Lower-termers have their own annual dances, including dances for Valentine's Day and Halloween for the seventh and eighth graders. In some years, there may also be themed dances; for example, in 2006, dances included the Halloween and Valentines' Dances as well as a "Black, White, and Silver Dance" for seventh and eighth graders.

== Alumni ==
Notable alumni include:

- Shirley Abrahamson (class of 1950) – first female Justice, first female Chief Justice and longest ever serving Justice, Wisconsin Supreme Court; past President, Conference of [Supreme Court] Chief Justices
- Birdie Amsterdam (class of 1918) – first female New York State Supreme Court Justice
- Charles Ardai (class of 1987) – founder and CEO, Juno; managing director, D.E. Shaw; author, editor, publisher/co-founder of Hard Case Crime, TV producer of Haven
- Martina Arroyo (class of 1953) – opera singer, fellow, American Academy of Arts and Sciences; member, National Council of the Arts; Kennedy Center Honoree; director, Carnegie Hall and Hunter College
- Eli Attie (class of 1985) – TV writer and producer, Emmy winner and former chief speechwriter for Al Gore
- Michelle Au (class of 1995) – Georgia State Senator
- Rachel Axler (class of 1995) – four-time Emmy-winning TV writer
- Kyle Baker (class of 1983) – comic book artist/writer, cartoonist, animator and satirist
- Maria Bentel (class of 1946) – American architect and founding partner of the architecture firm Bentel & Bentel Architects/Planners A.I.A
- Adam Berinsky (class of 1988) – Mitsui Professor of Political Science at MIT
- Diana Bianchi (class of 1972) – first female Director, National Institute of Child Health and Human Development
- Etel Billig (unknown) – actress and founder of Illinois Theatre Center
- Chana Bloch (class of 1957) – poet, translator
- Jeremy Blachman (class of 1996) – author, journalist, lawyer
- Angela Bofill (class of 1972) – jazz singer
- Alex Bores (class of 2009) - New York State Assemblyman
- Anise Boyer (unknown) – actress and dancer known for her work during the Harlem Renaissance
- Rachel M. Brownstein – literary critic, author, and academic
- Vanessa Brown (class of 1945) - actress
- Suse Broyde – professor of structural biology at New York University
- Naomi Reice Buchwald (class of 1961) -- federal district court judge
- Michael A. Burstein (class of 1987) – science fiction writer
- Jeanne Cagney (circa class of 1936) - film, stage, and television actress
- Hortense Calisher (class of 1928) – novelist, second female President of the American Academy of Arts and Letters
- Sewell Chan (class of 1994) – editor, The New York Times
- Peggy Charren (class of 1949) – activist and founder of Action for Children's Television, Presidential Medal of Freedom recipient
- Perry Chen (class of 1994) – co-founder, Kickstarter
- Louise Cochrane (circa class of 1936) – one of the first female TV producers
- Adam Cohen (class of 1997) – chemist and physicist, Harvard University
- Christopher Collet (class of 1986) – actor
- Olivia Cole (class of 1960) – actress, first African-American Emmy winner
- Nicholas Confessore (class of 1994) – Pulitzer Prize-winning political correspondent, The New York Times
- Constance E. Cook (circa class of 1937) – New York State Assembly member
- Gloria M. Coruzzi (class of 1972) – plant molecular biologist, professor and former Chair of Biology, NYU, Member of the National Academy of Sciences.
- Marie Maynard Daly – first African-American to receive a Ph.D. from Columbia University; first black woman in the United States to earn a Ph.D. in chemistry.
- Jon Daniels (class of 1995) – Texas Rangers General Manager; youngest-ever MLB GM
- Amy Davidson Sorkin (class of 1988) – executive editor of The New Yorker
- Lucy Dawidowicz (class of 1932) – Holocaust historian
- Manohla Dargis (class of 1979) – chief film critic, The New York Times
- Ruby Dee (class of 1939) – National Medal of Arts, Grammy, Emmy, Obie, Drama Desk, SAG and SAG Lifetime Achievement Award-winning actress; nominee for Academy Award for Best Supporting Actress; African American rights activist, poet, playwright, screenwriter and journalist
- Desmond Devlin (class of 1982) – writer, MAD Magazine
- Ophelia Devore (class of 1936) – first mixed-race model, founder-Grace Del Marco agency.
- Diane di Prima (class of 1951) – poet
- Mildred S. Dresselhaus (class of 1947) – Presidential Medal of Freedom winner; first female Institute Professor, Massachusetts Institute of Technology; first and only female winner of the National Medal of Science in engineering; past President, American Association for the Advancement of Science
- Jane Dubin (class of 1974) – Tony winning Broadway producer
- Sandi Simcha DuBowski (class of 1988) – filmmaker
- Dujeous (class of 1995) – (original members), hip-hop group
- Jewlia Eisenberg (class of 1988) – composer and musician
- Helen Epstein (class of 1965) – first female tenured journalism professor, New York University, author
- Sandra Fong (class of 2008) – Olympic athlete (shooting)
- Richard (DiMasi) Fontana (class of 1986) – free software and open source lawyer
- Yvette Fay Francis-McBarnette (class of circa 1941) – pioneering hematologist
- Michael C. Frank (class of 1999) – developmental psychologist, Stanford University
- Linda P. Fried (class of 1966) – first female Dean, Columbia University School of Public Health
- Esther Friesner (class of 1968) – science fiction and fantasy author
- Susan Fuhrman (class of 1961) – first female President of Teachers College, Columbia University; President of the National Academy of Education; former Dean of the University of Pennsylvania Graduate School of Education
- Hortense Gabel (circa class of 1930) – New York State Supreme Court Justice
- Leila Gerstein (class of 1990) – Emmy-winning TV producer and writer
- Eleanor Glueck (class of 1916) – criminologist, Harvard University
- Jamal Greene (class of 1995) – professor of law, Columbia Law School
- Martha Greenhouse (class of 1939) – actress and union leader
- Judd Greenstein (class of 1997) – composer, co-founder of New Amsterdam Records
- Irene Greif (class of 1965) – computer scientist
- Brett Haber (class of 1987) – Emmy-winning former ESPN SportsCenter anchor, current Tennis Channel & NBC Olympics host
- E. Adelaide Hahn (circa class of 1911) – first female president of the Linguistic Society of America
- Avril Haines (class of 1987) – first female Director of National Intelligence, Deputy National Security Advisor and Deputy Director of the Central Intelligence Agency
- Evelyn Handler (class of 1950) – first female President of both the University of New Hampshire and Brandeis University
- Christopher Hayes (class of 1997) – Two-time Emmy winning host, "All In with Chris Hayes", MSNBC, editor-at-large, "The Nation"
- Bernadine Healy (class of 1962) – first female NIH director and Red Cross president
- Carrie Kei Heim (class of 1991) – actress, lawyer
- Jonathan Hoefler (class of 1988) – typeface designer
- Steve Hofstetter (class of 1997) – comedian/radio personality
- Adam Horowitz (class of 1990) – TV writer and producer, screenwriter
- Florence Howe (class of 1946) – feminist activist
- Immortal Technique (class of 1996) – rapper/political activist
- Chris Jackson (class of 1989) – publisher
- Julia Jarcho – experimental playwright
- Elena Kagan (class of 1977) – United States Supreme Court Justice, first female United States Solicitor General and first female Dean of Harvard Law School
- Jeremy Kahn (class of 1987) – mathematician
- Khalil Kain - actor
- Eric Kaplan (class of 1985) – TV writer and producer
- Elizabeth (Sister Mary Cordia) Karl (class of 1916) - mathematician
- Max Kellerman (class of 1991) – host, HBO Boxing, ESPN SportsNation
- Alice Kober (class of 1924) – classicist, the major contributor to the deciphering of Linear B form of Ancient Greek
- Karen Kornbluh (class of 1981) – U.S. Ambassador to OECD, primary drafter of 2008 Democratic Party platform
- Jean Kwok (class of 1986) – novelist
- Diane Lane (dropped out) – Academy Award nominee for best actress
- Evelyn Lauder (class of 1954) – philanthropist
- Jennifer 8. Lee (class of 1994) – The New York Times journalist and author
- Adam Leon (class of 1999) – film director and writer
- Marilyn Levy (class of 1938) – photographic chemist at Fort Monmouth
- Judy Lewent (class of 1966) – director of Dell, GlaxoSmithKline, Motorola and MIT and former Exec. VP and CFO of Merck
- Robert Lopez (class of 1993) – Avenue Q, Book of Mormon, Frozen, and Coco composer-lyricist, youngest EGOT (Emmy (3), Grammy (3), Oscar (2) and Tony(3)) winner
- Audre Lorde (class of 1951) – poet, professor
- Mynette Louie (class of 1993) – film producer and professor
- Nava Lubelski (class of 1986) – artist and author
- Cecelia Eaton Luschnig – classics scholar, professor at University of Idaho
- Nnenna Lynch (class of 1989) – track and cross country runner
- Shola Lynch (class of 1987) – film maker
- Mike Maronna (class of 1995) – actor (The Adventures of Pete & Pete)
- Judith Matloff (class of 1976) – author and journalism professor
- Annette Michelson - film critic and writer
- Donna Minkowitz (class of 1981) – writer and journalist
- Lin-Manuel Miranda (class of 1998) – winner of a Pulitzer Prize, three Grammys, two Emmys, a MacArthur "Genius" Award and three Tony awards; creator and lead, Hamilton and In The Heights
- Samantha Massell (class of 2008) – actress
- Maria Muldaur (circa class of 1961) – folk singer
- Elizabeth Neufeld (circa class of 1944) – geneticist; second female winner of the Wolf Prize in Medicine; winner of the National Medal of Science and the Lasker Award
- Thisbe Nissen (class of 1990) – novelist
- Cynthia Nixon (class of 1984) – Tony, Grammy and (2) Emmy award-winning actress
- Doris Orgel (class of 1946) – children's literature author
- Mollie Orshansky (class of 1931) – statistician
- Cynthia Ozick (class of 1946) – novelist
- Ellen Ash Peters (class of 1947) – first female Justice and first female Chief Justice, Connecticut Supreme Court, first female President of the Conference of Supreme Court Chief Justices
- Marina Picciotto (class of 1981) – neuroscientist
- Pearl Primus (class of 1936) – choreographer/dancer
- Jennifer Raab (class of 1973) – former president, Hunter College
- Margaret Raymond (class of 1976) – dean and law professor, University of Wisconsin Law School
- Mina Rees (class of 1919) – mathematician, King's Medal for Service in the Cause of Freedom (UK) winner; National Academies of Science Public Welfare Medal winner; first female President and first President Emerita, Graduate School and University Center at CUNY; first female President of American Association for the Advancement of Science
- Eunice Reddick (class of 1969) – US Ambassador to Niger, Gabon and São Tomé and Príncipe
- Vivian Reiss (class of 1970) – artist
- Gloria Rojas (class of 1955) – journalist
- Stefan Savage (class of 1987) – computer scientist, 2017 MacArthur Foundation Fellow
- Bruce Schneier (class of 1981) – security expert
- Sarah Schulman (class of 1975) – artist, writer, journalist, English Professor
- Lois G. Schwoerer (class of 1945) – historian
- Susan Sheehan (class of 1954) – journalist, Pulitzer Prize winning author
- Martin Shkreli (did not graduate) – pharmaceutical CEO, felon
- Larissa Shmailo (class of 1974) – poet, translator, novelist, editor, and critic
- Amy Sohn (class of 1991) – novelist
- Christina Sormani (class of 1987) - mathematician, AMS Fellow
- Olivia P. Stokes - Baptist minister
- Jeannie Suk (class of 1991) – first female Asian-American tenured professor, Harvard Law School
- Laura Taylor Swain (class of 1975) – federal district court judge
- Deborah Tannen (class of 1962) – professor of linguistics, Georgetown University, author, You Just Don't Understand
- Michael Thaddeus (class of 1984) – mathematics professor, college rankings whistleblower
- Judith Jarvis Thomson (class of 1946) – professor emerita of philosophy, MIT
- Leonore Tiefer (class of 1961) – educator, researcher, therapist, and activist specializing in sexuality
- Tien Tzuo, (class of 1986) – tech entrepreneur
- Rebecca Wasserman-Hone – American wine expert based in France
- Nanette Wenger (class of 1947) – cardiologist
- Alma S. Woolley (class of 1950) – dean and professor emerita of Georgetown University School of Nursing and Health Studies, author, historian
- Marvin "Young MC" Young (class of 1985) – rapper, music producer and songwriter
- Nancy Yao (class of 1990) – founding director, Smithsonian American Women's History Museum

== See also ==
- Education in New York City
- Hunter College Elementary School
