= List of people from Park Forest, Illinois =

The following list includes notable people who were born or have lived in Park Forest, Illinois. For a similar list organized alphabetically by last name, see the category page People from Park Forest, Illinois.

== Academics and authors ==
Name	Image	Birth	Death	Known for	Association	Reference
Eugene Izzi		Mar 23, 1953	Dec 7, 1996	Crime writer		
David Mamet		Nov 30, 1947		Author, playwright, screenwriter, and film director; Pulitzer Prize winner		
Jeff Mariotte				Author and editor	Born in Park Forest	
Kathy Reichs		Mar 26, 1950		Professor of Anthropology, University of North Carolina, Charlotte; forensic anthropologist and crime novelist		
Stephen Shames		1947		Photographer, artist, and author		
Charles J. Shields		Dec 2, 1951		Author		

== Acting ==
Name	Image	Birth	Death	Known for	Association	Reference
Tom Berenger		May 31, 1949		Actor known for such films as Platoon, Major League and The Big Chill	Alumnus of Rich East HS	
Etel Billig		Dec 16, 1932	Mar 28, 2012	Actress and drama faculty at Prairie State College; co-founded the Illinois Theatre Center		
Aree Davis		Feb 19, 1991		Actress (The Haunted Mansion)	Born in Park Forest	

== Business ==
Name	Image	Birth	Death	Known for	Association	Reference
Bruce Pavitt		Mar 7, 1959		Founder of Sub Pop record label		
Howard Putnam		Aug 21, 1937		CEO of Southwest Airlines and Braniff International Airways		

== Journalism ==
Name	Image	Birth	Death	Known for	Association	Reference
Chris Bury		Dec 10, 1953		Journalist with ABC Nightline; Emmy Award winner		

== Music ==
Name	Image	Birth	Death	Known for	Association	Reference
Janna Allen		May 12, 1957	Aug 25, 1993	Songwriter		
Bruce Bromberg		Oct 31, 1941	Dec 27, 2021	Record producer		
Dennis DeYoung		Feb 18, 1947		Vocalist, keyboardist, songwriter; former member of the band Styx	Lived in Park Forest	
Felix da Housecat		Aug 25, 1971		DJ and record producer	Alumnus of Rich East HS	
David Liebe Hart		Apr 19, 1957		Musician and performance artist; cast member of Tim and Eric Awesome Show, Great Job!	Born in Park Forest	
Arthur W. ("Art") Hodes		Nov 14, 1904	Mar 4, 1993	Ukraine-born jazz pianist, writer, and educator		
Susan Kempter				Violinist, author and String Pedagogy Director, University of New Mexico		
Berry Oakley		Apr 4, 1948	Nov 11, 1972	Bassist and founding member of The Allman Brothers Band		
Tom Spahn		Jul 30, 1955		Emmy Award-winning composer, musician, recording engineer, producer		
Kim Thayil		Sep 4, 1960		Guitarist for rock group Soundgarden		
Dawn Upshaw		Jul 17, 1960		Soprano singer		
Hiro Yamamoto		Apr 13, 1961		Bassist, singer-songwriter, co-founder of Soundgarden		

== Politics and law ==
Name	Image	Birth	Death	Known for	Association	Reference
Jim Edgar		Jul 22, 1946		38th governor of Illinois		
Philip Klutznick		Jul 9, 1907	Aug 14, 1999	US ambassador to the United Nations; U.S. Secretary of Commerce; Chicago Bulls franchise President; President of World Jewish Congress		
Ann Rest		Apr 24, 1942		State senator from Minnesota		

== Sports ==
Name	Image	Birth	Death	Known for	Association	Reference
Steve Fisher		Mar 24, 1945		Head basketball coach at San Diego State University and University of Michigan (1989 NCAA champions)	Began coaching at Rich East HS, Park Forest	
Craig Hodges		Jun 27, 1960		Shooting guard for four NBA teams; two-time NBA champion with the Chicago Bulls (1991–1992)	Alumnus of Rich East HS	
Chuck Martin		Jun 8, 1968		Football head coach, Miami of Ohio; former offensive coordinator for Notre Dame	Born in Park Forest	
Larry McCarren		Nov 9, 1951		Pro Bowl center for the Green Bay Packers (1973–1984); sports commentator	Alumnus of Rich East HS	
Pete Stanicek		Apr 16, 1963		Second baseman and left fielder for the Baltimore Orioles	Alumnus of Rich East HS	
Steve Stanicek		Jun 19, 1961		Designated hitter for the Milwaukee Brewers	Alumnus of Rich East HS	
