= Amy Davidson Sorkin bibliography =

List of works by or about Amy Davidson Sorkin, American author, journalist and magazine editor.

== Essays and reporting ==
- Davidson, Amy (December 2, 2013). "Heal thyself". The Talk of the Town. Comment. The New Yorker. 89 (39): 21–22.
- — (February 3, 2014). "Game change". The Talk of the Town. Comment. The New Yorker. 89 (47): 19–20.
- — (July 28, 2014). "Crossing borders". The Talk of the Town. Comment. The New Yorker. 90 (21): 21–22.
- — (December 15, 2014). "Safer streets". The Talk of the Town. Comment. The New Yorker. 90 (40): 21–22.
- — (February 9, 2015). "God and the G.O.P." The Talk of the Town. Comment. The New Yorker. 90 (47): 17–18.
- — (March 16, 2015). "Atomic clocks". The Talk of the Town. Comment. The New Yorker. 91 (4): 19–20.
- — (April 20, 2015). "What videos show". The Talk of the Town. Comment. The New Yorker. 91 (9): 29–30.
- — (May 18, 2015). "Unclear dangers". The Talk of the Town. Comment. The New Yorker. 91 (13): 33–34.
- — (August 3, 2015). "Broken". The Talk of the Town. Comment. The New Yorker. 91 (22): 17–18.
- — (January 25, 2016). "Radical measures". The Talk of the Town. Comment. The New Yorker. 91 (45): 19–20.
- — (February 22, 2016). "Courting Black voters". The Talk of the Town. Comment. The New Yorker. 92 (2): 17–18.
- — (March 21, 2016). "Conventional wisdom". The Talk of the Town. Comment. The New Yorker. 92 (6): 31–32.
- — (November 7, 2016). "October surprises". The Talk of the Town. Comment. The New Yorker. 92 (36): 15–16.
- — (January 2, 2017). "Mrs. Obama". The Talk of the Town. Comment. The New Yorker. 92 (43): 17–18.
- — (January 30, 2017). "Trump takes the oath". The Talk of the Town. Comment. The New Yorker. 92 (47): 17–18.
- — (June 19, 2017). "The man in the room". The Talk of the Town. Comment. The New Yorker. 93 (17): 19–20.
- — (July 3, 2017). "Feeling worse". The Talk of the Town. Comment. The New Yorker. 93 (19): 17–18.
- Sorkin, Amy Davidson (August 21, 2017). "Misdiagnosing a crisis". The Talk of the Town. Comment. The New Yorker. 93 (24): 15–16.
- — (November 6, 2017). "The silent majority". The Talk of the Town. Comment. The New Yorker. 93 (35): 17–18.
- — (October 1, 2018). "The next confirmation". The Talk of the Town. Comment. The New Yorker. 94 (30).
- — (November 18, 2019). "Alter-ego trips". The Talk of the Town. Comment. The New Yorker. 95 (36): 17–18.
- — (June 1, 2020). "Safer schools". The Talk of the Town. Comment. The New Yorker. 96 (15): 11–12.
- — (August 17, 2020). "Failing schools". The Talk of the Town. Comment. The New Yorker. 96 (23): 11–12.
- — (September 7, 2020). "Out of control". The Talk of the Town. Comment. The New Yorker. 96 (26): 17, 20.
- — (December 28, 2020). "Ladies and gentlemen". The Talk of the Town. Comment. The New Yorker. 96 (42): 17–18.
- — (January 25, 2021). "Fear itself". The Talk of the Town. Comment. The New Yorker. 96 (45): 11–12.
- — (February 15–22, 2021). "Senate rules". The Talk of the Town. Comment. The New Yorker. 97 (1): 13–14.
- — (June 21, 2021). "Viral theories". The Talk of the Town. Comment. The New Yorker. 97 (17): 13–14.
- — (September 20, 2021). "Forever trial". The Talk of the Town. Comment. The New Yorker. 97 (29): 13–14.
- — (October 4, 2021). "Stock answers". The Talk of the Town. Comment. The New Yorker. 97 (31): 15–16.
- — (May 16, 2022). "After the leak". The Talk of the Town. Comment. The New Yorker. 98 (12): 17–18.
- — (May 30, 2022). "Gun country". The Talk of the Town. Comment. The New Yorker. 98 (14): 13–14.
- — (October 10, 2022). "Spooked : what's wrong with the C.I.A.?". The Critics. A Critic at Large. The New Yorker. 98 (32): 60–65.
- — (February 13–20, 2023). "Hitting the ceiling". The Talk of the Town. Comment. The New Yorker. 99 (1): 13–14.
- — (March 27, 2023). "Electoral returns". The Talk of the Town. Comment. The New Yorker. 99 (6): 15–16.

== Columns from newyorker.com ==
Close Read

- Davidson, Amy (January 26, 2009). "Yoga fatwa, political football".
- — (January 27, 2009). "The other Gitmo, mean Troy".
- — (January 28, 2009). "Bad precedent, Terrible Towel".
- — (January 29, 2009). "Peanut butter and Favre".
- — (January 30, 2009). "Guns, Germans and Steelers".
- — (February 2, 2009). "Lombardi and the Pirates".
- — (July 23, 2009). "Stupid arrests, outrageous cases".

Conversation

- Davidson, Amy (September 11, 2006). "The world after 9/11".

Daily Comment

- Sorkin, Amy Davidson (December 27, 2017). "Lessons from an unseemly presidential transition—from Hoover to F.D.R."
- — (September 6, 2018). "At his Supreme Court hearing, Brett Kavanaugh provides evasive answers on 9/11 and war crimes".

New Yorker Blog

- Davidson, Amy (January 21, 2009). "Nancy and Michelle".

New Yorker Festival

- Davidson, Amy (October 3, 2008). "Brothers and sisters".
- — (October 4, 2008). "Toss-ups".

News Desk

- Davidson, Amy (January 27, 2009). "Owner of steel".

Q. & A.

- Davidson, Amy (November 3, 2003). "The American style".
- — (February 13, 2006). "The nuclear edge".
- — (February 27, 2006). "The democracy question".
- — (March 27, 2006). "After the warlords".
- — (May 29, 2006). "Can the Dems do it?".
- — (July 10, 2006). "Missed opportunities".
- — (October 16, 2006). "Not a drop to` drink?".
