= Jeremy Blachman =

American journalist (born 1979)

- Born: 1979 (age 46–47)
- Occupations: Novelist, Journalist, Columnist
- Writing career
- Genres: Sports, Entertainment, Business

Jeremy Blachman (born 1979) is an American journalist and the author of Anonymous Lawyer: A Novel.

== Biography ==
Blachman graduated from Hunter College High School in 1996. He received his undergraduate degree from Princeton University, is a 2005 graduate of Harvard Law School, and currently lives in New York.

== Anonymous Lawyer ==
Blachman started the Anonymous Lawyer blog in his second year at Harvard Law School taking on the satirical persona of a law firm hiring partner". After revealing his identity to the New York Times he earned a book deal with Henry Holt to turn the blog into a novel. Anonymous Lawyer: A Novel was published in hardcover in 2006, and then in paperback by Picador (imprint) in 2007.

The book was in development for a sitcom adaptation at NBC.

Anonymous Lawyer has been translated into Korean, Italian, Polish, Thai, Hebrew and Russian.

== Journalism ==
Blachman's journalism and writing has appeared in McSweeney's, FanGraphs, the Wall Street Journal, The New York Times, The New Republic, Moment, Lusso, Kveller, The Bygone Bureau, Splitsider, Grin & Tonic, Thought Catalog, The Millions, The Nervous Breakdown, SparkLife and LA Weekly.
