= Rebecca Rand =

Rebecca Rand may refer to:

- Rebecca Wasserman-Hone (1937–2021), American wine expert
- Rebecca Rand Kirshner (born 1974), American writer
