= Billig =

Billig is a surname. Notable people with the surname include:

- Andy Billig (born 1968), American politician
- Etel Billig (1932–2012), American actress and director
- Frederick S. Billig (1933–2006), American aerospace engineer
- Fritz Billig (1902–1986), Austrian philatelist
- Hannah Billig (1901–1987), British physician
- Janet Billig Rich (born 1967), American talent manager and producer
- Michael Billig (born 1947), British academic
- Simon Billig, British actor
