= Mary Karl =

Mary Karl may refer to:

- Mary Brennan Karl (1893–1948), American educator
- Mary Cordia Karl (1893–1984), American mathematician
