= Lusso =

Lusso may refer to:

- Lusso (magazine), a UK-based lifestyle magazine
- Lusso, a Unilever ice cream brand in Switzerland (falls under its "Heartbrand" brand umbrella)
- Hasselblad Lusso, a variant of the Sony α ILCE-7R digital mirrorless camera
- L or Lusso, a Fiat 500 model (1968–1972)
- Ferrari 250 GT Lusso, a luxury Italian sports car
