= Amy Davidson (disambiguation) =

Amy Davidson (born 1979) is an American actress.

Amy Davidson may also refer to:

- Amy Davidson (writer) (born 1969 or 1970), American author, journalist and magazine editor
- Amy Davidson (basketball), Minnesota Miss Basketball 1986 Class AA
- Amy Davidson, preparator namesake of the genus Zosuchus davidsoni
- Amy Davidson, a fictional character in the miniseries Melba
