= Gloria M. Coruzzi =

American biologist

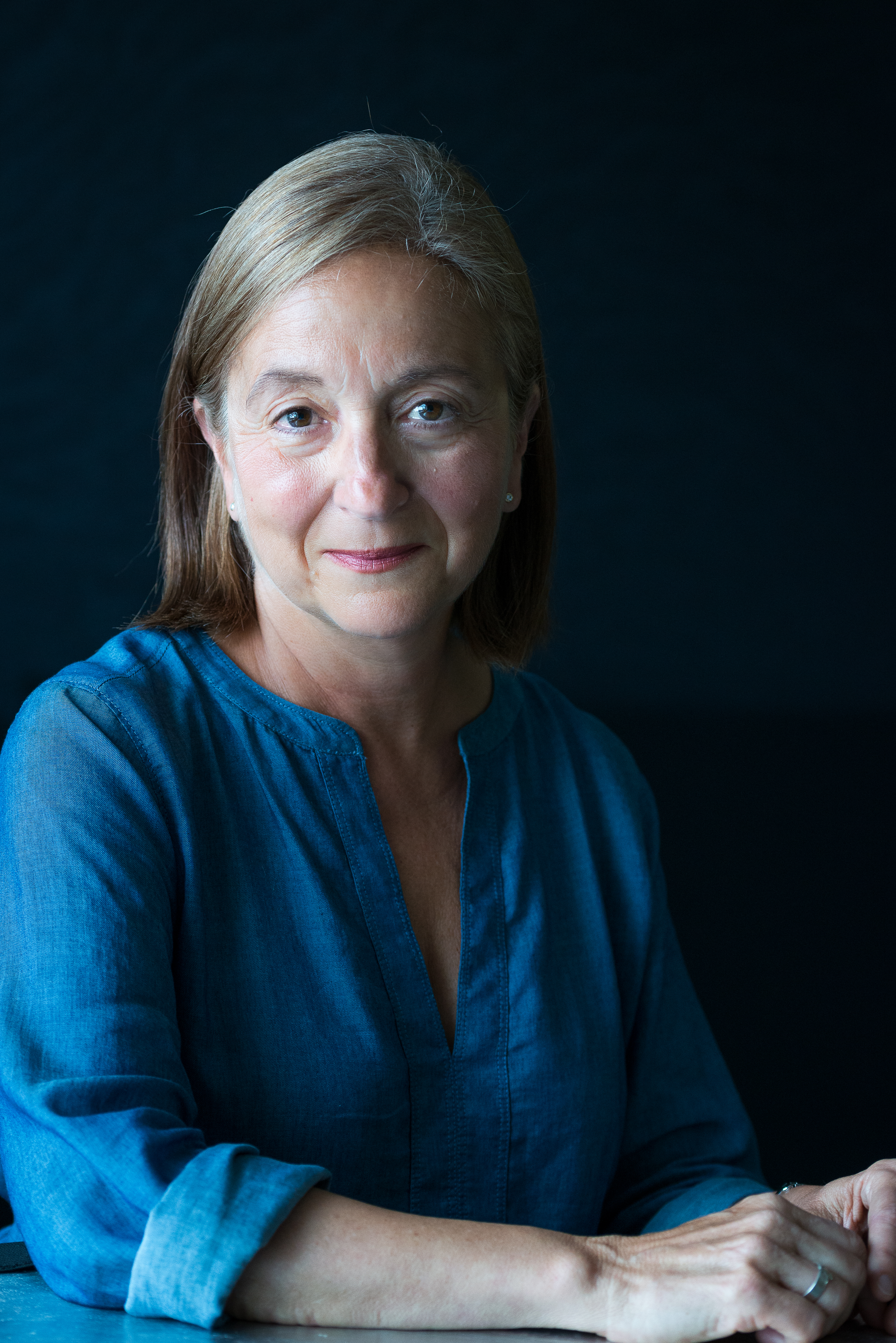
- Born: New York City, US
- Education: Hunter College High School; Fordham University (B.S.); NYU School of Medicine (Ph.D)
- Known for: Gene regulatory networks affecting nitrogen use efficiency
- Awards: National Academy of Inventors (Fellow) National Academy of Sciences (Member) New York Botanical Garden (Distinguished Counselor)
- Scientific career
- Fields: Plant Systems Biology
- Workplaces: Rockefeller University (1980-1991); New York University (1992-present)
- Website: coruzzilab.bio.nyu.edu

Gloria M. Coruzzi is an American molecular biologist specializing in plant systems biology and evolutionary genomics.

== Education and career ==
As Carroll & Milton Petrie Professor of Biology at New York University’s Center for Genomics and Systems Biology, Coruzzi studies gene regulatory networks controlling nitrogen use efficiency (NUE) and root nutrient foraging in the model plant Arabidopsis. She also examines phylogenomic approaches across higher plant species to identify genes associated with the evolution of key plant traits such as seeds. This research resides in Pasteur's quadrant as a scientific investigation that is ultimately meant to be beneficial to society.

Coruzzi has established 10 patents in the study of gene networks affecting nitrogen use efficiency. Her laboratory collaborated in the development of the software platform VirtualPlant.

As an investigator on the National Science Foundation (NSF) Plant Genome project, she helped generate the largest genome-scale phylogeny of the seed plants, which allows researchers to explore the genomic underpinnings of plant diversity.

Coruzzi is from New York. She went to Hunter College High School (class of 1972) and took her Bachelor of Science in biology from Fordham University in 1976. She conducted studies of the genetic code in yeast mitochondrial DNA. She earned her PhD in molecular and cell biology at NYU School of Medicine in 1979. In a post-doctoral National Institutes of Health (NIH) fellowship, she applied molecular approaches to plants that contributed to the cloning of one of the first plant nuclear genes. As an associate professor at Rockefeller University, Coruzzi identified key genes controlling the assimilation of inorganic nitrogen into key amino acids used for nitrogen transport in plants.

Coruzzi took a position as a professor at NYU in 1993. Her lab has constructed the first integrated genomic network used to discover and validate nitrogen regulation of the circadian clock in plants. It predicted the function of gene network states under untested conditions.

She is a member of the Editorial Board for PNAS.

Coruzzi has authored and coauthored over 200 research papers and served as chair of the Department of Biology at NYU from 2003 to 2011. Her research is funded by the National Institutes of Health, NSF 2010 Project, NSF Plant Genome Project, the NSF Database and Information Project, and United States Department of Energy.

== Awards and honors ==
Coruzzi was named a Fellow of the American Association for the Advancement of Science in 2005, a Fellow of the American Society of Plant Biology in 2010, a Fellow of the Agropolis Foundation in 2012.

Coruzzi was awarded Stephen Hales Prize in 2016 for her pioneering work in exploring plant systems biology and the first integrated view of mechanisms controlling the assimilation and use of nitrogen.

Coruzzi was appointed Distinguished Counselor at New York Botanical Garden in 2017 for her professional accomplishments in the field of plant science.

She was elected to the National Academy of Sciences in 2019.

Coruzzi has been recognized as a Pioneer Member of the American Society of Plant Biologists.

Coruzzi was named a Fellow of the National Academy of Inventors (NAI)] in 2025.

== Advisory boards ==
1994–1997, North American Arabidopsis Steering Committee
1996–1999, International Society of Plant Molecular Biology, Board of Directors
1996–2000, International Society of Plant Molecular Biology, Board Member
2008–Present, New York Botanical Garden, Member of the Corporation
2012–2015, Donald Danforth Plant Science Center, Scientific Advisory Board
2012–2017, International Arabidopsis Informatics Consortium, Scientific Board
2012–2017, The Arabidopsis Information Portal Scientific Advisory Board
2015–2018, Department of Energy (DOE) Joint Genome Institute Plant Program User Advisory Committee
2019–Present, DOE Joint Genome Institute Scientific Advisory Committee
