= Birdie Amsterdam =

American judge (1901–1996)

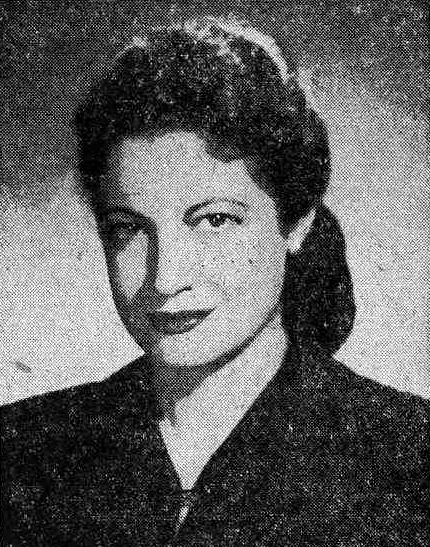
- Amsterdam c. 1955
- Born: March 25, 1901; New York City, U.S.
- Died: July 8, 1996 (aged 95)
- Education: City College of New York; New York University School of Law
- Occupations: Attorney, judge

Birdie Amsterdam (March 25, 1901 – July 8, 1996) was an attorney and judge in New York City, who became the first woman to serve as a justice of the New York State Supreme Court.

== Biography ==
Born on the Lower East Side of Manhattan into a first generation Jewish American family, Amsterdam attended Hunter College High School, studied for one year at the City College of New York, and then attended New York University School of Law. Amsterdam attended law school at night while working as a record-keeper at Mount Sinai Hospital. According to her New York Times obituary, "She swiftly established a reputation not only as a skillful lawyer but also as an eloquent friend of the downtrodden, a champion of women's rights and a diligent [Democratic] party worker."

== Career ==
In 1940, Amsterdam was elected to the New York City Municipal Court, becoming the first woman to serve as a judge of that court. She was reelected to that position in 1949. In 1954, Amsterdam was appointed to fill a vacancy as a justice of the City Court, a higher-ranking tribunal on which she was again the first woman to serve as a judge; she was elected to a full term on that court in 1955. In 1958, Amsterdam was elected as a justice of the New York State Supreme Court, the state's highest trial court. She served in that position until her retirement in 1975.

Birdie was also an activist and leader in her community. She led a war bond drive on the Lower East side in addition to being involved as a district co-leader in the Manhattan Democratic Club.

== Personal life ==
Briefly married and later divorced to Dr. Robert Dunn. Spent many years living with Ruth and Judge Milton Sanders.

She died on July 8, 1996.
