= Suse Broyde =

American chemical biologist

- Education: Hunter College High School; City College of New York; Brooklyn Polytechnic
- Scientific career
- Workplaces: New York University; Princeton University

Suse Broyde is an American chemical biologist who is a professor of biology and an affiliate professor of chemistry at New York University. Her research focuses on the molecular mechanisms that process DNA damage induced by environmental and endogenous carcinogens, notably mutagenesis and repair.

== Early life, education and career ==
Broyde (maiden name Buehler) was born in Nördlingen, Germany, and moved to New York City in 1940. She was the only child of Jewish-German immigrants who had escaped Nazi Germany. She became interested in science as a child, and was accepted at Hunter College High School at the age of eleven, where she received a strong education in the liberal arts, as well as science and mathematics. Broyde earned her Bachelor's degree in chemistry at the City College of New York (CCNY), which has been termed “the Harvard of the poor.” She graduated Phi Beta Kappa and Magna cum Laude, with honors in the major. From there Broyde entered the PhD program in chemistry at the Polytechnic Institute of Brooklyn (Brooklyn Poly, now NYU Tandon), where she majored in physical chemistry with a minor in physics. Her thesis, in the laboratory of Gerald Oster, investigated the photochemistry and spectroscopy of chlorophylls to elucidate the biophysical basis of photosynthesis.

Subsequently, Broyde was a research scientist at IBM Watson Labs at Columbia University where she continued to work on chlorophylls with biophysicist Seymour Stephen Brody. Brody was subsequently recruited by the New York University biology department to initiate a biophysics program focusing on plants and photosynthesis; Broyde joined him in establishing the lab and mentoring students and postdocs. Her first child was born while she was a graduate student and her second child was born while she was at IBM. Following her work at NYU, Broyde was at Princeton University in the laboratory of Robert Langridge where she was introduced to the newly emerging field of molecular modeling, and her research centered on nucleic acid structure. She continued working in this field and received her first NIH grant while in the physics department at Georgia Institute of Technology.

Eventually, Broyde returned to New York University as a research associate professor in the biology department and became a full professor in 1987. At NYU she formed collaborations with chemistry department colleagues Robert Shapiro and Nicholas Geacintov; their experimental approaches complemented Broyde's modeling, which centers on the structure and function of DNA that is damaged by environmental or endogenous carcinogens, such as those present in tobacco smoke or induced by the ultraviolet light. How such lesions in DNA are repaired, and how they generate mutations during replication that initiates the carcinogenic process is a focus of the research, which delineates structural, dynamic, and energetic aspects of the damaged DNA and its interactions with polymerases and repair proteins. She is the author or co-author of nearly 400 published works, as well as the Wiley book The Chemical Biology of DNA Damage with Nicholas Geacintov. Broyde also has a full teaching docket, concentrating on upper level undergraduates with a pre-health focus and an interest in drug design, as well as on literature reading and fundamental biological topics for graduate students. She has mentored many graduate students and post-doctoral associates.

== Honors and awards ==
Broyde received the Outstanding Woman in Science Award from the Association of Women in Science (1996) and the American Chemical Society Division of Chemical Toxicology Founder's Award with Nicholas Geacintov (2016). Her work has been funded by NIH for many decades.
