= Nava Lubelski =

- Born: 1968 (age 57–58); New York City, U.S.
- Education: Wesleyan University (BA)
- Known for: Contemporary art, fibers
- Website: www.navalubelski.com

Nava Lubelski (born 1968 in) is a contemporary artist who works and lives in Asheville, North Carolina.

== Background and education ==
Lubelski was born in 1968 and grew up in the SoHo section of New York City. She graduated from Hunter College High School in 1986 and earned a BA in Russian literature and history from Wesleyan University in 1990. She spent a year abroad as a student in Moscow, Russia.

Lubelski wrote The Starving Artist's Way and is a 2008 grantee of The Pollock Krasner Foundation.

== Artistic career ==
Lubelski is a contemporary artist who works with fibers, paper sculptures, and various 3D stitched pieces. Her work engages a variety of materials and techniques, focusing on hybridizing notions of masculine/feminine, art/craft, painting/sculpture.

Lubelski often works with hand stitching over stains on fabric. She stitches on the edges of the stain thus "repairing" them aesthetically. Her inspiration for this first came at an art foundation benefit when a glass of red wine was spilled on a tablecloth. Lubelski saved the tablecloth and commemorated the event by stitching with red around the stain, titling it Clumsy, taking the embarrassment and spill and making a painterly gesture out of them.

Lubelski's work contrasts the accidental with the meticulous, using the stain as a 'pattern' from which she creates her abstract forms. Lubelski is currently most well known for her embroidery works on canvas which explore "the contradictions between the impulse to destroy and the compulsion to mend." Linens are stained and ripped, creating the initial marks that Lubelski meticulously embroiders over. The artist uses the graphic look of the stain as a play on creating and mending female sexuality and as an expression of aggression. According to the artist there is a social symbolism in the stain, something shameful or worthy of reproach, that the woman historically cleans up, hides or discards. These works often have holes that expose the back of the canvas, or are hung off the wall to add sculptural shadows. Lubelski engages contradictions of destruction and construction in her work through celebrating the emotions that engender a variety of human impulses, characteristics, and moral challenges.

Lubelski's stitched works are often considered painterly, and even abstract expressionist.

Examples of her stitched work were included in Pricked: Extreme Embroidery at The Museum of Arts & Design in New York and in the book Contemporary Textiles: The Fabric of Fine Art, published in 2008 by Black Dog Publishing in London. Lubelski's 2009 solo show, Recombination, at the New York City gallery LMAKprojects was reviewed in The New York Times by Karen Rosenberg, who described Lubelski as being "in a category of artists who “paint” with thread."

Lubelski is also known for making shredded paper sculptures reminiscent of the cross-section of a tree. To create the tightly-wound coils that make up the "rings", recycled paper from written content (such as tax forms or deposit slips) were glued together. The cross-sections are an exercise of translating the data into a physical manifestation and as a tool, "for managing overwhelmingly large tallies, such as those we encounter regularly in reports on war or climate change."

Other sculptural works such as Gone (2011) or glove works like [a cast of my left hand in the shape of a] Glove v. 2 (2008) use thread as a three-dimensional form. The Glove series focuses on improvisational stitches and the contrast between the artist's gloves and hyper-realistic Victorian lace gloves.

=== "ReMade" Hatchfund project ===
In 2011 Lubelski created a Hatchfund project for ReMade: a factory-manufactured limited edition of 50–100 embroidered "paintings". Each piece was to be a digital tracing of a stained embroidered work then converted by software into a stitch file for manufacture by industrial sewing machines. The minimum fundraising goal was $2,500. The target was reached with $4,035 by April 6, 2011.

=== Additional Exhibits ===
Lubelski's work was included at the Center for Craft, Creativity & Design's Benchspace Gallery in 2015 as part of a commemoration of the Beacon Manufacturing Company. in 2020, Lubelski's work was included as part of "By a Thread" at the Tracey Morgan Gallery.

== Galleries ==
- LMAKprojects in New York
- OHT Gallery in Boston
