= Rachel M. Brownstein =

American literary critic, author, and academic

- Education: Hunter College High School, Barnard College, Yale University
- Occupations: Author, literary critic, academic

Rachel M. Brownstein (born 1937) is an American feminist literary critic, author, and academic.

== Early life ==
Rachel M. Brownstein was born in Manhattan, was graduated from Hunter College High School and Barnard College, and received her PhD in English from Yale University.

== Academic career ==
Brownstein is an emeritus professor of English at Brooklyn College and the CUNY Graduate Center. She is known for her contributions to the field of English literature and her work on the novel, particularly the 18th and 19th century British novel. Her research and writing have focused on various aspects of literature, including narrative theory, women writers, and the intersections of literature and culture.

She is the author of four books, Becoming a Heroine: Reading about Women in Novels; Tragic Muse: Rachel of the Comédie-Française; Why Jane Austen?; and American Born: an Immigrant's Story, a Daughter's Memoir. She was a MacDowell Foundation fellow (1980) and spent a residency at the Rockefeller Foundation Center in Bellagio, Italy (1996). She was a fellow at the Lewis Walpole Library at Yale University (2016–2017). In 1993, she received the George Freedley Award from the Theatre Library Association for Tragic Muse and it was listed as a Notable Book of the Year by the New York Times Book Review.

She is considered a foundational feminist literary critic and a leading scholar of Jane Austen's works.

== Selected publications ==
- Brownstein, Rachel M. (May 1994). Becoming a Heroine: Reading about Women in Novels. Viking 1982, Penguin 1984, Columbia U. Press 1994. ISBN 978-0-231-10000-7.
- Brownstein, Rachel M. Tragic Muse: Rachel of the Comédie-Française. Knopf 1993, Duke U. Press 1995. ISBN 978-0-394-57451-6.
- Brownstein, Rachel M. (2022). Why Jane Austen?. Columbia University Press. ISBN 978-0-231-52724-8.
- Brownstein, Rachel M. (2023). American Born: an Immigrant's Story, a Daughter's Memoir. University of Chicago Press. ISBN 978-0226823065.
