= Catherine Y. Spong =

American physician and researcher

Catherine Y. Spong is an American physician and scientist. She is Chief of the Division of Maternal Fetal Medicine and Paul C. MacDonald Distinguished Chair of the Department of Obstetrics and Gynecology at the University of Texas Southwestern Medical Center. Prior to this, she worked for the National Institute of Child Health for 23 years, most recently serving as deputy director. Spong is an expert in maternal and child health, especially regarding prematurity, fetal complications, and improving child outcomes. She has several patents to her name for neuroprotective agents that help prevent fetal injury.

Spong was involved in a study in 2016 that monitored US Olympic Athletes for exposure to the Zika virus during the 2016 Summer Olympics in Brazil. She is a strong advocate for inclusion of underrepresented groups in research.
