= Chris Jackson (publisher) =

American publisher

- Born: 1971 (age 54–55); New York, US
- Education: Hunter College High School
- Alma mater: Columbia University
- Occupations: Publisher; Editor
- Employer: Random House

Chris Jackson (born 1971) is an American publisher and editor-in-chief of the One World imprint of Random House.

== Early life ==
Jackson grew up in Morningside Heights, Manhattan, and attended Hunter College High School and Columbia University.

== Career ==
In the mid-1990s, Jackson's early career in publishing began as an editorial assistant at John Wiley & Sons, which was followed by a job at Crown Publishing.

From 2006 to 2016, he was executive editor of Spiegel and Grau before becoming head of One World, a division of Penguin Random House.

The New York Times described Jackson as a "rare public star in the world of book publishing". Calling Jackson "someone you need to know", Ebony cited his work with Ta-Nehisi Coates, Jay-Z and Beyoncé, as well as Jackson's "background and understanding of how to take Black stories and turn them into something that the entire market should--and could--appreciate." Critic Vinson Cunningham, writing for The New York Times Magazine, said: "To the extent that 21st-century literary audiences have been introduced to the realities and absurdities born of the phenomenon of race in America, Jackson has done a disproportionate amount of that introducing." Speaking of his experience working with Jackson, who published Eddie Huang's memoir Fresh Off the Boat, Huang noted Jackson also developed work addressed to readers the publishing industry had not been reaching. "I remember him saying, 'It's not even about the numbers. You're introducing an audience. You're going to get people that don't read books to read this book.'"

In 2019, Jackson was named by Time magazine as one of the "12 Leaders Who Are Shaping the Next Generation of Artists".

== Personal life ==
Jackson married Sarah McNally, owner of the independent bookstore McNally Jackson, in 2004. They share a son, Jasper. Jackson and McNally divorced in 2010.
