= Susan Shurin =

American senior adviser (1944–2025)

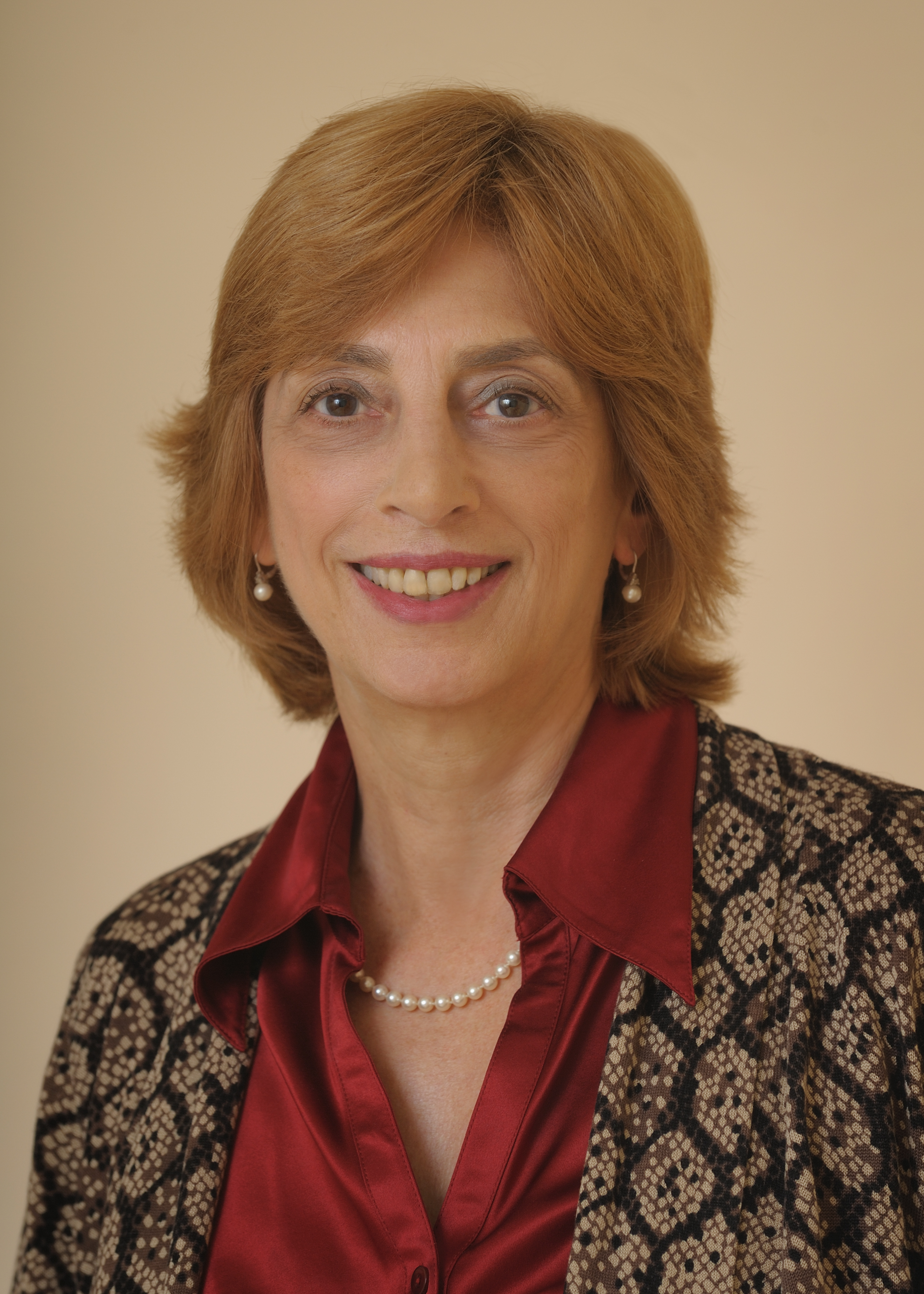
Susan Shurin, M.D.

Susan Shurin (born 1944, died 2025) was a senior adviser at the National Cancer Institute. From 2006–2014, she served as Deputy and Acting Director of the National Heart, Lung, and Blood Institute at the National Institutes of Health.

== Career ==
Before joining the NHLBI, Shurin was Professor of Pediatrics and Oncology at Case Western Reserve University in Cleveland, Ohio; Director of Pediatric Hematology-Oncology at Rainbow Babies & Children's Hospital; Director of Pediatric Oncology at the Case Comprehensive Cancer Center; and Vice President and Secretary of the Corporation at Case Western Reserve University.

Shurin joined the NHLBI as Deputy Director in February 2006, coming from Case Western Reserve University in Cleveland, Ohio. Shurin served as Acting Director of the Eunice Kennedy Shriver National Institute of Child Health and Human Development (NICHD) October and December 2009, while also serving as the Deputy Director of the NHLBI. In December 2009, Shurin was named acting director of the NHLBI and served in this role until August 2012.

As Deputy Director, Shurin directly managed the $1.6B clinical research portfolio of the NHLBI; as Acting Director, she managed the full $3B annual budget of the institute, and collaborated with other Institutes and Centers at the NIH. She led the trans-NIH development of policies for sharing genomic data obtained using taxpayer funds, and developed a global health program in non-communicable diseases, focusing on cardiovascular and pulmonary diseases. She led renovations of the NHLBI-supported sickle cell disease research programs to direct support enhance patient benefit from research.

In July, 2014, Shurin retired from the NHLBI and joined the National Cancer Institute's Center for Global Health as a Senior Adviser to the Center for Global Health. In this capacity, she continues engagement in global biomedical research capacity building, especially in low and LMIC settings, with a focus on cancer prevention and treatment. She lived in San Diego, California until her death in 2025.

== Education and research ==
Shurin received her education and medical training at Harvard University and the Johns Hopkins School of Medicine. Her laboratory research focused on the physiology of phagocyte function, recognition and killing of pathogens; mechanisms of hemolysis, red blood cell destruction; and iron overload, a serious chronic condition in which the body absorbs too much iron leading to a buildup in organ tissues. In the late 1970s, Shurin led studies that resulted in the development of desferrioxamine as a chelator to manage transfusional iron overload in chronically transfused persons with thalassemia. Widespread application of this therapy has dramatically transformed the outcome of thalassemia across the globe.

Shurin was active in clinical research in many aspects of pediatric hematology-oncology, including participation in the Children's Cancer Group (CCG), now the Children's Oncology Group, as well as multiple studies of sickle cell disease and hemostasis. She also served on the Executive Committee of the CCG and founded and chaired the CCG Bioethics Committee. Shurin co-chaired the Physician Scientist Workforce Working Group of the Advisory Committee to the NIH director in 2013–14, and remains involved in implementation of recommendations.

== Memberships ==
Shurin served on multiple NIH advisory panels. She was on the boards or in leadership positions of numerous local and national professional organizations, including the American Board of Pediatrics, the American Pediatric Society and the American Society of Hematology, of which she is the Treasurer. She served on the board of the Global Alliance for Chronic Disease (gacd.org), an alliance of public funders of biomedical research in non-communicable diseases, which she chaired for two years.
