= Diana Bianchi =

American medical geneticist and neonatologist

Diana W. Bianchi
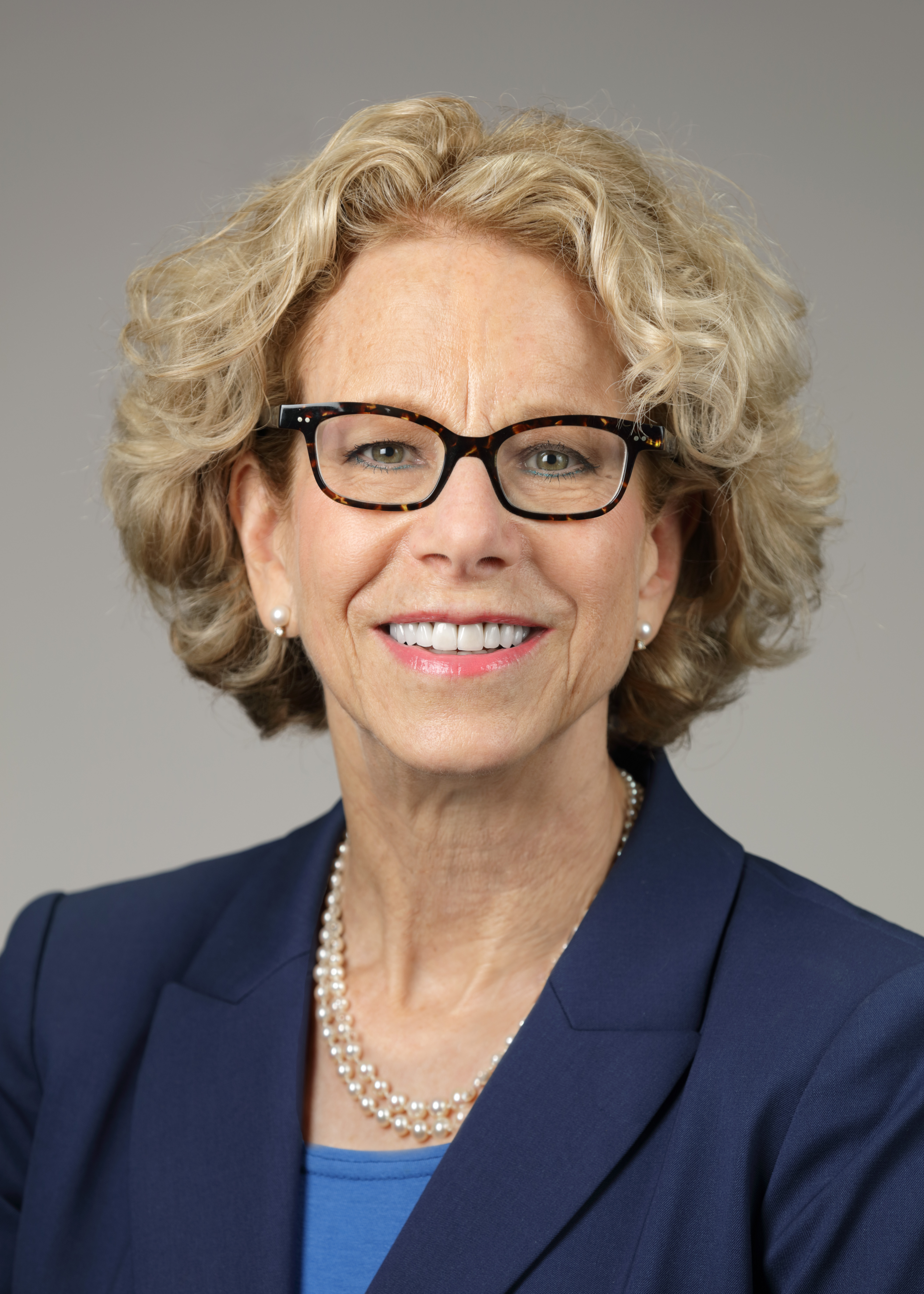
- Education: University of Pennsylvania (BA); Stanford University (MD)
- Known for: Fetal cell microchimerism Non-invasive prenatal testing (NIPT)
- Scientific career
- Fields: Medical Genetics, Neonatology
- Institutions: Eunice Kennedy Shriver National Institute of Child Health and Human Development, Boston Children's Hospital, Tufts University School of Medicine, Tufts Medical Center, Floating Hospital for Children
- Doctoral advisor: Leonard Herzenberg

Diana W. Bianchi is a medical geneticist and neonatologist noted for her pioneering research on fetal cell microchimerism and noninvasive prenatal testing. She is the former director of the U.S. National Institutes of Health Eunice Kennedy Shriver National Institute of Child Health and Human Development, a post often called “the nation’s pediatrician.” Prior to that role, Bianchi was the Natalie V. Zucker Professor of Pediatrics, Obstetrics, and Gynecology at Tufts University School of Medicine and founder and executive director of the Mother Infant Research Institute at Tufts Medical Center. She also has served as Vice Chair for Research in the Department of Pediatrics at the Floating Hospital for Children at Tufts Medical Center.

== Early life and education ==
Bianchi grew up in New York City and graduated from Hunter College High School.

Bianchi earned a B.A. magna cum laude from University of Pennsylvania and an M.D. from Stanford University School of Medicine. While at Stanford she performed her doctoral research with Leonard Herzenberg, studying the use of flow cytometry to develop a noninvasive cytogenetic prenatal diagnostic test for Down syndrome. One of Herzenberg’s children had Down syndrome, so the project had both scientific and personal significance for her mentor.

== Career ==
After medical school at Stanford University, she completed her postdoctoral work at Boston Children’s Hospital and Harvard Medical School. Bianchi joined the faculty at Harvard University in 1986, concurrently assuming a position as an attending neonatologist and geneticist at Boston Children’s Hospital. In 1993, Bianchi left to take a position at Tufts University School of Medicine, receiving an endowed chair in 2002.

In 2007, Bianchi became editor-in-chief of Prenatal Diagnosis, the journal of the International Society for Prenatal Diagnosis. In 2010, she founded the Mother Infant Research Institute at Tufts Medical Center, assuming the position of executive director. Bianchi is one of four authors of the book Fetology: Diagnosis and Management of the Fetal Patient, which won the Association of American Publishers award for the best textbook in clinical medicine in 2000.

Bianchi has worked for many years on developing methods to isolate intact fetal cells from maternal blood as a noninvasive way to obtain fetal material for genetic diagnosis. While the work proved challenging due to the relative rarity of the fetal cells in the mother’s blood, the research led to an unexpected finding. Bianchi discovered that intact fetal cells remain in the mother's blood and organs for decades following pregnancy, with the possibility of migrating to the site of an injury in the mother, dividing and changing into the cells needed to fix the problem. This has led to a field of study known as fetal cell microchimerism.

Bianchi also has worked extensively on noninvasive prenatal testing using DNA sequencing of fetal and placental DNA fragments in the blood of pregnant women. Dr. Bianchi’s research is part of what has helped expand the use of non-invasive testing in the general obstetrical population. The sequencing technology employed in cfDNA testing has a number of potential uses in many areas of health care, including cancer, transplantation and in vitro fertilization protocols, and research she is conducting is exploring those possibilities. This technology has been used in clinical prenatal care since 2011. She is a former member of the Clinical Advisory Board of Verinata Health, an Illumina company.

In 2014, Bianchi was the lead author on a study published in the New England Journal of Medicine that examined cell-free fetal DNA test performance in a general obstetrical population. This study showed that cell-free DNA testing had lower false positive rates and higher positive predictive values than maternal serum biochemistry analyses with or without ultrasound measurements of the back of the fetal neck. Bianchi has also studied the underlying biological reasons for false positive results following NIPT. She has shown that maternal malignancies can cause genome-wide imbalance that presents as a false positive result of fetal aneuploidy. Currently, Bianchi is working with a mouse model to develop a prenatal treatment that could be given to a pregnant woman carrying a fetus with Down syndrome. The goal of the work is to improve brain development in the womb and neurocognition after birth.

Bianchi was appointed director of the Eunice Kennedy Shriver National Institute of Child Health and Human Development, part of the U.S. National Institutes of Health (NIH), on August 25, 2016. In this role, she oversaw research on pediatric health and development, maternal health, medical rehabilitation, population dynamics, reproductive health, and intellectual and developmental disabilities. She also became a senior investigator at NIH's National Human Genome Research Institute (NHGRI) and head of its Prenatal Genomics & Therapy Section.

In 2020, she received an honorary doctorate from the University of Amsterdam that recognized her contributions to the fields of fetal cell microchimerism and noninvasive prenatal testing using DNA sequencing of fetal and placental DNA fragments. In 2022, Bianchi was a finalist for a Samuel J. Heyman Service to America Medal, or Sammie, in recognition of her efforts in advancing critical research to understand the medical implications of COVID-19 among underserved populations. Later that year, Bianchi was named to Forbes Magazine's Top 50 Women Over 50: Impact.

In December 2024, Bianchi and her lab team at NHGRI published results from the IDENTIFY study in the New England Journal of Medicine. The study found that noninvasive prenatal testing can incidentally detect cancers in pregnant women, many of whom had no prior disease symptoms. The researchers detected several maternal cancers in their early stages, enabling potentially life-saving treatment for the study participants. In early 2025, Bianchi received a Luminary Award from the Precision Medicine World Conference for her prominent role in accelerating precision medicine into the clinic.

On March 31 during the 2025 United States federal mass layoffs, Bianchi was placed on administrative leave.

== Leadership positions in professional societies ==
- 1999 - President, Perinatal Research Society
- 2002-2005 - Council Member (Genetics), Society for Pediatric Research
- 2002-2005 - Board of Directors, American Society of Human Genetics
- 2007-2012 - Council Member, American Pediatric Society
- 2006-2010 - President, International Society for Prenatal Diagnosis
