= Mollie Orshansky =

American economist (1915–2006)

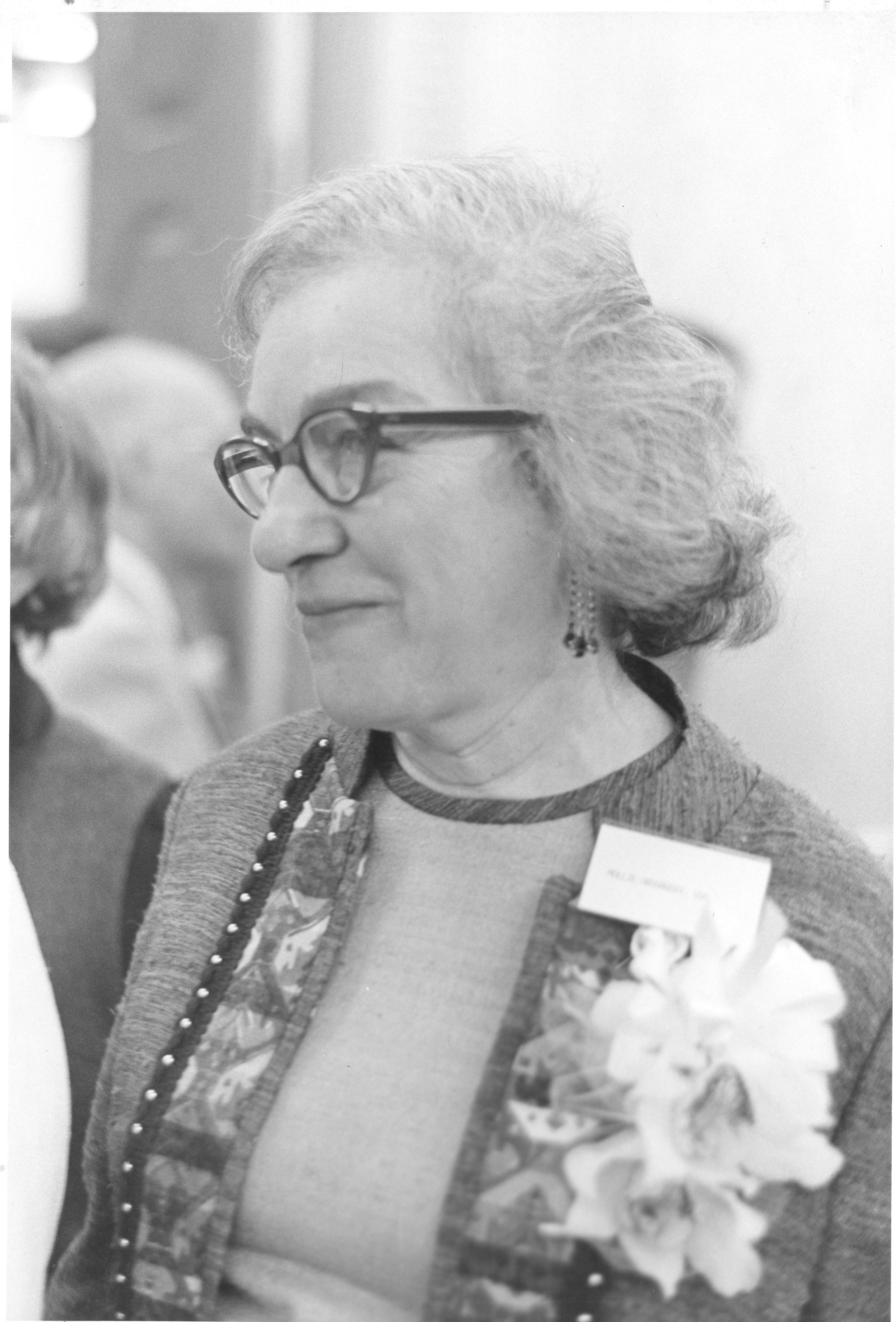
- Orshansky in 1967
- Born: January 9, 1915; New York City, NY, USA
- Died: December 18, 2006 (aged 91); New York City, NY, USA
- Education: Hunter College, American University
- Occupations: Economist, Statistician
- Known for: Developed the official measurement of poverty used by the U.S. government

Mollie Orshansky (January 9, 1915 – December 18, 2006) was an American economist and statistician who, in 1963–65, developed the Orshansky Poverty Thresholds, which are used in the United States as a measure of the income that a household must not exceed to be counted as poor.

== Life and career ==
Orshansky was born January 9, 1915, the third of six daughters of Samuel and Fannie Orshansky, Jewish immigrants who settled in the Bronx, New York City after leaving Ukraine. She attended Hunter College High School, and received an A.B. in mathematics and statistics from Hunter College in 1935. Orshansky continued graduate studies in economics and statistics at the Department of Agriculture Graduate School at American University.

In 1939, Orshansky became a research clerk with the Children's Bureau; working on biometric studies of child health, growth, and nutrition. In January 1942, as a statistician in the New York City Department of Health, she worked on a survey of the incidence of, and therapies for, pneumonia. In 1945, Orshansky moved to the U.S. Department of Agriculture; where she spent the next thirteen years as a family economist, director of the Program Statistics Division, and a food economist.

In 1958, Orshansky joined the Social Security Administration as a social science research analyst in the Office of Research and Statistics. In this capacity, she was responsible for analytical studies to measure income adequacy, family welfare and patterns of family income. In 1963, Orshansky developed the official measurement of poverty used by the U.S. government (see Poverty in the United States). She used the cost of a nutritionally adequate diet as the basis for a cost-of-living estimate; and to calculate a cost of living for families of different sizes and composition.

Her interest in the subject came from personal experience. "She knew first-hand what it was like to grow up poor… as she grew up, she became quite familiar with the experience of having to forego one small purchase in order to have the money for something else. She later summed up this aspect of her early life by saying, ‘If I write about the poor, I don’t need a good imagination — I have a good memory.

In 1976, Orshansky received the Distinguished Service Award in recognition for her leadership in creating the first nationally accepted measurements of income adequacy and applying them to public policy. Her retirement came in 1982.

Orshansky was hospitalized in the autumn of 2001, and a legal battle ensued over her care. Orshansky was taken to New York, according to her wishes, but a judge who had appointed a guardian tried to compel her return to Washington DC. The judge was overruled on appeal, and Orshansky died in Manhattan several years later.

== Popular culture ==
Orshansky's development of the Poverty Thresholds was a plot element in an episode of the United States television program The West Wing. In the episode "The Indians in the Lobby," the federal government was considering a reclassification of poverty that would have made use of a new formula to add four million additional citizens to the category. Orshansky, a native-born U.S. citizen, was characterized incorrectly in the show as an Eastern European immigrant who created a United States "cost of living formula ... based on life in Poland during the Cold War."
