= Duane Alexander =

American medical doctor (1940–2020)

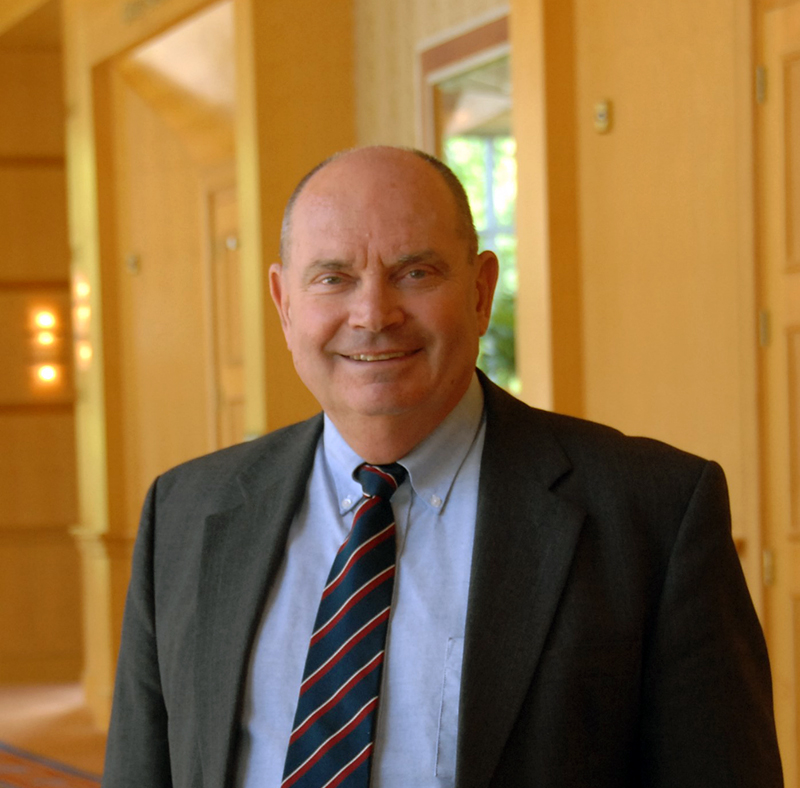
- Born: August 11, 1940; Baltimore, Maryland
- Died: February 16, 2020 (aged 79)
- Citizenship: American
- Education: Johns Hopkins University (MD)
- Occupation: American physician
- Years active: Director of the National Institute of Child Health and Human Development from 1986 through 2009; Senior scientific adviser to the Director of the NIH's Fogarty International Center from 2009
- Spouse: Marianne Ellis
- Children: Keith and Kristin

Duane Alexander (August 11, 1940 – February 16, 2020) was an American medical doctor who was the director of the National Institute of Child Health and Human Development from 1986 through 2009. In 2009 he moved to the position of senior scientific advisor to the Director of the NIH's Fogarty International Center.

Alexander married Marianne Ellis in 1963. They have two children, Keith and Kristin.

He received his MD from Johns Hopkins.

On February 16, 2020, Alexander died after having battled Alzheimer's disease for several years.
