= Gloria Rojas =

American journalist (1939–2022)

- Born: April 1, 1939; The Bronx, New York
- Died: February 2, 2022 (aged 82); Cambridge, Maryland
- Education: State University of New York at Albany; Columbia University Graduate School of Journalism
- Occupation: Journalist

Gloria Rojas (April 1, 1939 – February 2, 2022) was an American journalist. She was one of the first Latina broadcast journalists in New York City as well as one of the few journalists who has worked for each of the Big Four television networks owned-and-operated stations in the New York metropolitan area.

== Early life and education ==
Rojas was born on April 1, 1939, in the Bronx to Agustina Rojas, who was a housekeeper and nanny, and Rafael Astolfo Rojas, who died when she was 10. She graduated Hunter College High School and attended the State University of New York at Albany, where she received a degree in education.

In 1968, she joined a summer program for minority students—the only one of its kind at the time—at the Columbia University Graduate School of Journalism, where she would later study journalism as a graduate student.

== Career ==
Before going into television, Rojas was a school teacher who taught middle school and high school students. In 1964, Rojas made her television debut on public television station WNDT (now known as WNET) where she presented a bilingual education program at the station, where its audience included Spanish-speaking audiences learning English as well as English-speaking audiences learning Spanish.

In 1968, Rojas began her career in journalism at WCBS-TV, where she worked as a reporter trainee with the station. She would later work at WLS-TV in Chicago and then WNEW-TV (now WNYW) in New York.

In 1974, Rojas was hired by WABC-TV news director Al Primo, who had previously brought the Eyewitness News format and title to New York City. The hiring of female reporters like Rojas also helped contribute to the success of the station; many stations in the 1970s saw a growing trend of hiring female reporters and eventually anchors in newscasts. While working at the station, she also worked with Geraldo Rivera and Gil Noble in co-hosting Like It Is. Rojas helped launch the career of Rivera when she told him that WABC was looking to hire a bilingual reporter. She would remain with the station as its New Jersey correspondent until 1986, when she went to work for WNBC. Rojas retired in 1991.

== Later life and death ==
In 2012, Rojas moved to Maryland. She would later publish a fictional memoir titled Fire Escapes.

Rojas died from complications of cancer and kidney failure at a nursing home in Cambridge, Maryland, on February 2, 2022, at the age of 82.
