= Eunice Kennedy Shriver National Institute of Child Health and Human Development =

US National Institutes of Health unit

Coordinates: 39°0′12″N 77°6′16″W

Agency overview
- Formed: 1962
- Agency executive: Diana W. Bianchi, Director
- Parent agency: National Institutes of Health
- Website: www.nichd.nih.gov

The Eunice Kennedy Shriver National Institute of Child Health and Human Development (NICHD) is one of the National Institutes of Health (NIH) in the United States Department of Health and Human Services. It supports and conducts research aimed at improving the health of children, adults, families, and communities, including:

- Reducing infant deaths
- Promoting healthy pregnancy and childbirth
- Investigating growth and human development
- Examining problems of birth defects and intellectual and developmental disabilities
- Understanding reproductive health
- Enhancing function across the lifespan through rehabilitation research

== History ==
The impetus for NICHD came from the Task Force on the Health and Well-Being of Children, convened in 1961 and led by Dr. Robert E. Cooke, a senior medical advisor to President John F. Kennedy. Eunice Kennedy Shriver also served on the task force, which reported that more research was needed on the physical, emotional, and intellectual growth of children.

The U.S. Congress established NICHD in 1962 as the first NIH institute to focus on the entire life process rather than on a specific disease or body system. NICHD became a funding source for research on birth defects and intellectual and developmental disabilities (IDDs), created a new pediatrics specialty, and established IDDs as a field of research. The institute also focused on the idea that adult health has its origins in early development and that behavior and social science were important aspects of human development.

On December 21, 2007, by act of Congress (Public Law 110–54), NICHD was renamed the Eunice Kennedy Shriver National Institute of Child Health and Human Development in honor of Mrs. Shriver's vision, dedication, and contributions to the founding of the institute.

== Past directors ==
Past directors from 1963–present:

No.	Portrait	Director	Took office	Left office	Refs.
1		Robert A. Aldrich	March 1, 1963	October 1964	
2		Donald Harting	July 8, 1965	1966	
3		Gerald D. LaVeck	October 9, 1966	September 1, 1973	
Acting		Gilbert L. Woodside	September 1, 1973	September 1, 1974	
4		Norman Kretchmer	September 1, 1974	September 30, 1981	
Acting		Betty H. Pickett	September 30, 1981	June 30, 1982	
5		Mortimer B. Lipsett	July 1, 1982	January 7, 1985	
6		Duane Alexander	February 5, 1986	September 30, 2009	
Acting		Susan Shurin	October 1, 2009	November 30, 2009	
Acting		Alan Edward Guttmacher	December 1, 2009	July 21, 2010	
7		Alan Edward Guttmacher	July 22, 2010	September 30, 2015	
Acting		Catherine Y. Spong	October 1, 2015	October 31, 2016	
8		Diana W. Bianchi	November 1, 2016	April 2025	
Acting		Alison Cernich	April 2025	Present	

== Mission ==
The mission of NICHD is to ensure that every person is born healthy and wanted, that women suffer no harmful effects from reproductive processes, and that all children have the chance to achieve their full potential for healthy and productive lives, free from disease or disability, and to ensure the health, productivity, independence, and well-being of all people through optimal rehabilitation.

== Operation ==
As of November 2016, the director of NICHD is Diana W. Bianchi.

NICHD's budget in 2015 was an estimated $1.3 billion, which supported research at institutions, universities, and organizations throughout the world, as well as research conducted by NICHD scientists on the NIH campus in Bethesda, MD, and at other facilities.

=== Components ===
- Office of the Director
- Division of Extramural Research
  - Child Development and Behavior Branch
  - Contraceptive Discovery and Development Branch
  - Developmental Biology and Structural Variation Branch
  - Fertility and Infertility Branch
  - Gynecologic Health and Disease Branch
  - Intellectual and Developmental Disabilities Branch
  - Maternal and Pediatric Infectious Disease Branch
  - Obstetric and Pediatric Pharmacology and Therapeutics Branch
  - Pediatric Growth and Nutrition Branch
  - Pediatric Trauma and Critical Illness Branch
  - Population Dynamics Branch
  - Pregnancy and Perinatology Branch
- National Center for Medical Rehabilitation Research
- Division of Intramural Population Health Research
  - Biostatistics and Bioinformatics Branch
  - Epidemiology Branch
  - Health Behavior Branch
- Division of Intramural Research
  - Office of the Scientific Director
  - Scientific Affinity Groups
    - Aquatic Models of Human Development
    - Basic Mechanisms of Genome Regulation
    - Behavioral Determinants and Developmental Imaging
    - Bone and Matrix Biology in Development and Disease
    - Cell and Structural Biology
    - Cell Regulation and Development
    - Developmental Endocrine Oncology and Genetics
    - Genetics and Epigenetics of Development
    - Integrative Membrane, Cell, and Tissue Pathophysiology
    - Metals Biology and Molecular Medicine
    - Neurosciences
    - Pediatric Endocrinology, Metabolism, and Molecular Genetics
    - Perinatal and Obstetrical Research
    - Reproductive Endocrine and Gynecology

== National Children's Study ==
The National Children's Study (NCS) was a longitudinal cohort study that planned to recruit participants from across the United States of America. The NCS was led by the National Institutes of Health, with the NICHD serving as the scientific lead. It was intended to measure the many factors that contribute to health and disease from before birth through age 21. This included, but was not limited to, the search for drivers of diseases with prenatal or developmental origins. The Study was closed in December 2014.

=== Organization ===
Within NICHD, the NCS Program Office administered the implementation of day-to-day Study operations. The Program Office was supervised by the Study Director, Steven Hirschfeld, MD, PhD Associate Director for Clinical Research, NICHD.

For advice and recommendations regarding Study framework, content, and methodologies, the NCS Program Office engaged external advisors and scientific groups. These groups included federal partners such as the NCS Federal Advisory Committee and a Federal Consortium with representatives from multiple federal agencies including: the U.S. Department of Health and Human Services, the National Institute of Environmental Health Sciences of the National Institutes of Health, the Centers for Disease Control and Prevention, and the U.S. Environmental Protection Agency. An independent Study Monitoring and Oversight Committee monitored study progress and participant safety.

In addition to these more formal channels, the NCS solicited feedback from subject matter experts from around the world and from individuals, community advocates, and professional societies concerned with child health. The NCS Program Office also provided public forums for input on a variety of initiatives.

=== Congressional Mandate ===
The "President's Task Force on Health Risks and Safety Risks to Children" recommended this federal initiative in 1999, after which Congress passed the Children's Health Act of 2000 (Title X, Section 1004). The Act charged NICHD to:

1. plan, develop, and implement a prospective cohort study, from birth to adulthood, to evaluate the effects of both chronic and intermittent exposures on child health and human development; and
2. investigate basic mechanisms of developmental disorders and environmental factors, both risk and protective, that influence health and developmental processes.

The Act required this NCS to:

1. incorporate behavioral, emotional, educational, and contextual consequences to enable a complete assessment of the physical, chemical, biological, and psychosocial environmental influences on children's well-being;
2. gather data on environmental influences and outcomes on diverse populations of children, which may include the consideration of prenatal exposures; and
3. consider health disparities among children, which may include the consideration of prenatal exposures

=== Objective ===
The NCS was designed to examine the effects of the environment—broadly defined to include factors such as air, water, diet, sound, family dynamics, community, and cultural influences— and genetics on the growth, development, and health of children across the United States. The NCS was designed to follow approximately 100,000 children, some from before birth, through age 21 years. The NCS planned to collect comprehensive information to:

1. contribute to improving the health and well-being of all children
2. deepen our understanding of the contribution of various factors to a range of health and disease outcomes
3. understand factors that lead to health disparities.

With this broad perspective, the NCS was designed to contribute to the implementation of health equity, where each individual has an opportunity to realize their health potential.

=== Discontinued ===
The NCS was in its Vanguard, or pilot phase, which was designed to assess the feasibility, acceptability, cost, and utility of Study scientific output, logistics, and operations prior to initiating the Main Study. The Vanguard Study enrolled about 5,000 children in 40 counties across the United States. General recruitment was completed in July 2013.

On December 12, 2014, the National Children's Study closed, after an expert review committee advised the NIH Director that moving forward with the larger Main Study would not be the best way to add to the understanding of how environmental and genetic factors influence child health and development.

== Notable accomplishments ==
NICHD has made numerous contributions to improving the health of children, adults, families, and communities. Selected research advances from 2015 include improving the health of infants born preterm, encouraging healthy behaviors, and optimizing rehabilitation.
