= Rebecca Wasserman-Hone =

American wine expert (1937–2021)

- Rebecca Wasserman-Hone, from a 2003 newspaper profile
- Born: Rebecca Louisa Rand; January 18, 1937; New York City
- Died: August 20, 2021 (aged 84); Beaune, France
- Other names: Becky Wasserman
- Occupation(s): Wine expert, importer, promoter
- Spouse: Russell Hone
- Children: 2

Rebecca Wasserman-Hone (January 18, 1937 – August 20, 2021) was an American wine expert, importer, and promoter, based in France.

== Early life ==
Rebecca Louisa Rand was born and raised in New York City, the daughter of Louis H. Rand and Yolanda Y. Dragoș. Her father was a stockbroker; her mother was a ballerina with the Romanian Royal Opera House. She graduated from Hunter College High School, and then briefly attended Bryn Mawr College. She had musical training as a harpsichordist, and studied composition.

== Career ==
Wasserman moved to Burgundy in 1968 with her husband and young children, and lived on a farm in Bouilland. After a divorce, she worked with a neighbor to sell oak barrels to American wineries. In time, she became a wine agent, initially for a California importer, Kermit Lynch. She founded her business, Le Serbet (later Becky Wasserman & Co.), in Beaune in 1979. In 1997 she became a Chevalier de l’Ordre du Mérite Agricole, for her services to Burgundy farmers. She was honored with the Decanter's Hall of Fame award in 2019.

Wasserman-Hone was credited with promoting awareness of the products of artisanal vineyards in Burgundy to Americans and other markets. She had little patience for fussiness about wines, saying "A wine is not to be discussed, it is to be drunk and give happiness and joy and a nice feeling to people."

== Personal life ==
Rebecca Rand married three times. Her first husband was Dennis Andrew; they divorced. Her second husband was artist Bart Wasserman. They had two sons before they, too, divorced. Her third husband was a British wine expert, Russell Hone. They married in 1989. After several years of chronic obstructive pulmonary disease, she died in Beaune in 2021, aged 84 years.
