= Mary Cordia Karl =

American mathematician

Elizabeth Karl (Sister Mary Cordia) (November 16, 1893 – August 30, 1984) was an American mathematician who contributed significantly to the theory of orthopoles in geometry. This was the subject of her PhD thesis at Johns Hopkins University in 1931.

She was Head of the Mathematics department at College Notre Dame of Maryland (now Notre Dame of Maryland University) until 1965, when she retired with the title of Professor Emeritus.

She was a 1916 graduate of Hunter College High School.

== PhD thesis ==
Her PhD thesis was titled "Projective Theory of the Orthopoles". A large summary of this work was published in the American Mathematical Monthly (June–July 1932, pages 327–338). The key idea is to associate a well chosen line-parabola to each ordinary line in the plane, in such a way that the orthopole of any element of the line-parabola belongs to initial line. This correspondence can be illustrated by the following figure (where L is the line at infinity and A_{1}, A_{2}, A_{3} the base triangle):

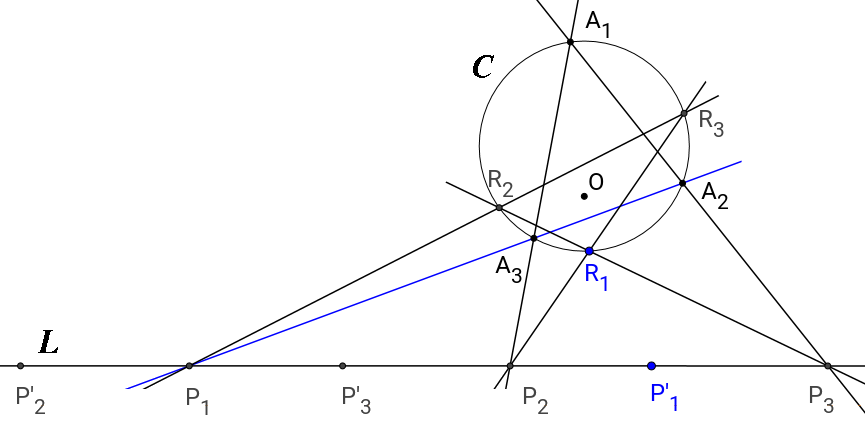
The parabola associated to line A_{2}A_{3} is the degenerate line parabola {R_{1}, P′_{1}}

Such a projective apparatus makes it possible, given a point in the plane, to determine the lines that admit this point as orthopole. In the general case, there are four of them (including the line at infinity and the complex lines if any).
