= Michael C. Frank =

American psychologist

Michael C. Frank is a developmental psychologist at Stanford University who proposed that infants' language development may be thought of as a process of Bayesian inference. He has also studied the role of language in numerical cognition by comparing the performance of native Pirahã language speakers to that of MIT undergraduate students in numeric tasks. For this work, he traveled to Amazonas, Brazil with Daniel Everett, a linguist best known for his claim that Pirahã disproves a crucial component of Noam Chomsky's theory of universal grammar, recursion. Frank won the Cognitive Science Society's prestigious Marr Award for this work in 2008.

== LEVANTE Project ==
Frank is now the Director of the Data Coordinating Center for the LEVANTE project. The project is a framework to support long-term longitudinal and cross-cultural studies on what affects learning variability between children.

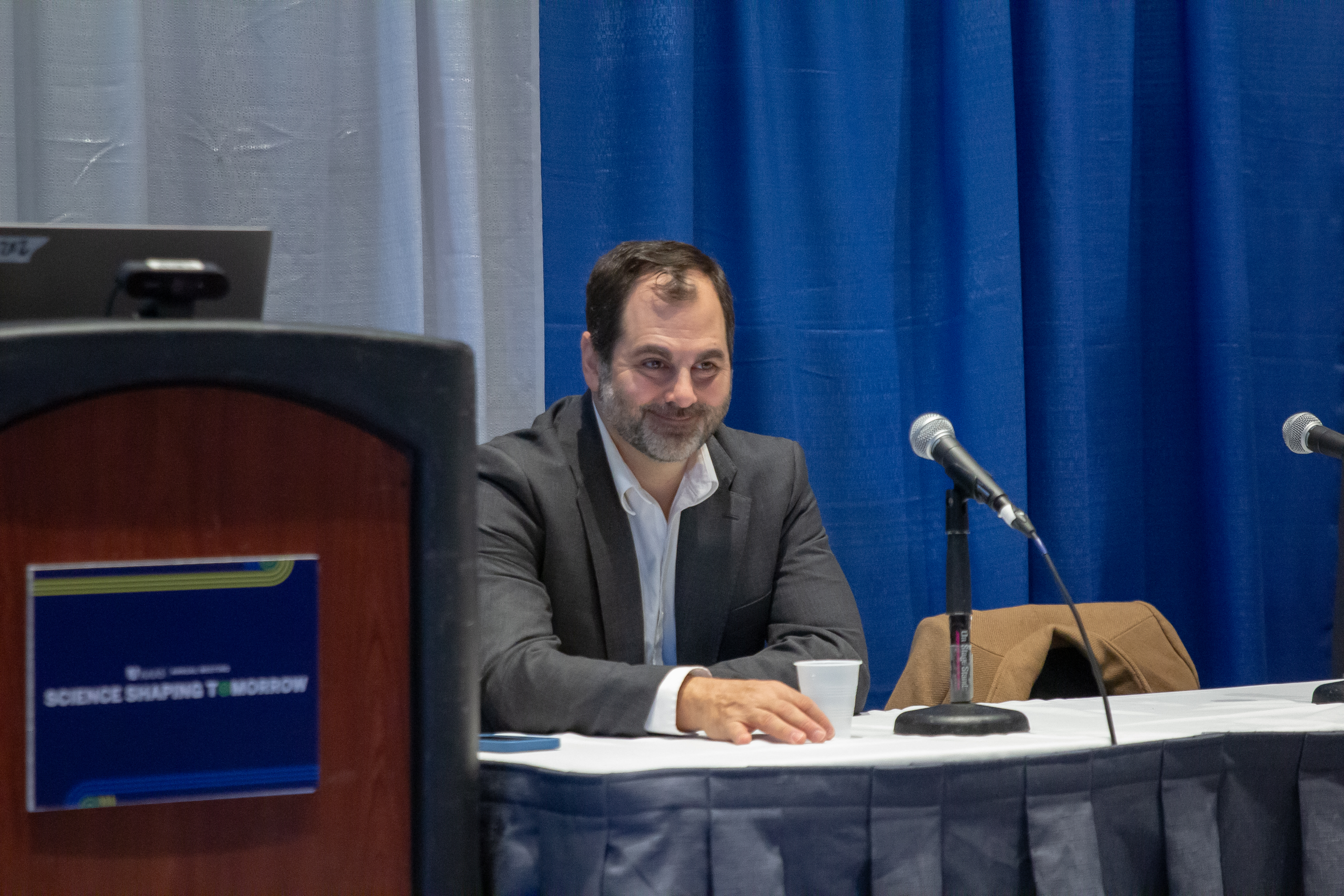
Frank in 2025
