= Computerized neuropsychological assessment =

Computerized neuropsychological assessment helps neuropsychologists and psychologists to assess functions relative to possible brain damage using a software. For more information about the tests, see Neuropsychological tests.

== Available packages ==
Currently there are some commercial packages available for buying. Once bought, they can be installed at a clinic and be used to assess patients.

== Computerized versus traditional tests ==
There are some discussions on the effectiveness of computerized tests. The detriments in using computerized versions are discussed in an article.

Computerized tests have the following main benefits:

=== Speed ===
Results are obtained as soon as the tests are finished – no need to consult tables or other informations.

=== Security ===
Every rule is programmed in the software, so there will be no errors during the execution or getting the results.

== Hemispheric asymmetry ==
To assess different hemispheric functions, some packages offer verbal and non verbal tests. These tests are applied according to Neuropsychological tests.

== Development at universities ==
By having clinical applications, some universities develop their own packages, like University of Cambridge (CANTAB - Cambridge Neuropsychological Test Automated Battery) and Universidade Federal de São Paulo (NAFW - Neuropsychological Assessment Framework, LAACS - Lateralized Attention Assessment Computerized System and ThoughtFlow-Sys).

== List of software ==
- ThoughtFlow-Sys
- NAFW - Neuropsychological Assessment Framework
- LAACS - Lateralized Attention Assessment Computerized System
