= Lusso (magazine) =

UK-based luxury lifestyle magazine

- Lusso’s issue 16 cover
- Editor-in-Chief: Robert Clayman
- Categories: Luxury lifestyle
- Frequency: Quarterly
- Circulation: 15,222
- Publisher: Nick Jempson
- First issue: January 2005
- Company: SWR Media (Magazines)
- Country: UK
- Based in: London
- Language: English
- Website: www.lussomagazine.co.uk
- ISSN: 1745-6029

Lusso is a United Kingdom-based quarterly magazine dealing with all aspects of the luxury lifestyle market. It is published by SWR Media (Magazines) Ltd, an independent company based in London. The first issue was published in January 2005.

== Columns and blogs ==
Several well-known people have contributed to Lusso, including

- Phil Spencer (property)
- Doug Richard (yachts, cars)
- Andy Green (super cars, motorbikes, track cars)
- Simon Baron-Cohen
- Russ Malkin
