= Amy Davidson Sorkin =

American journalist and editor

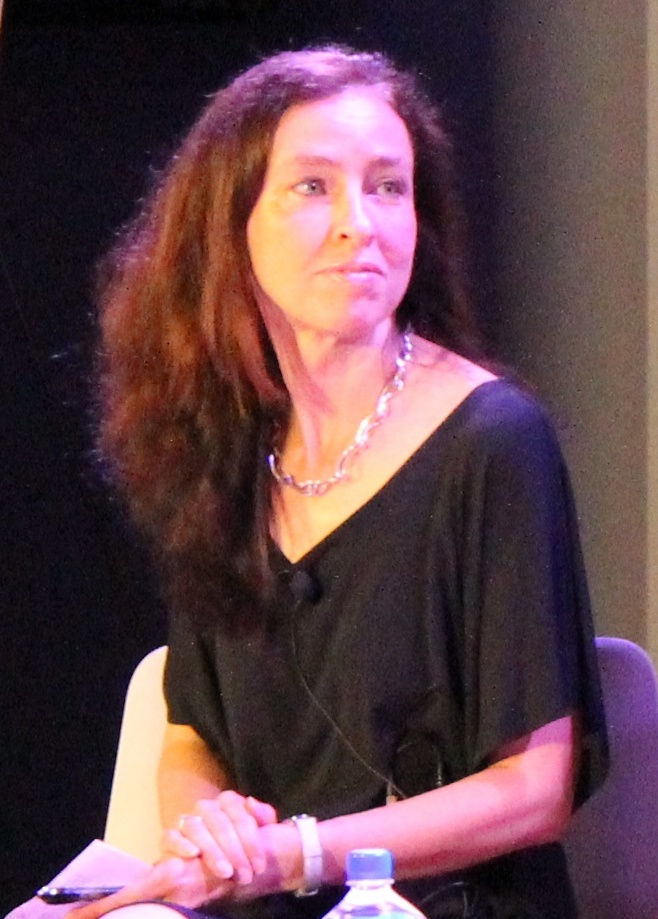
- Davidson Sorkin at New America NYC in 2015
- Born: Amy Davidson; 1969 or 1970 (age 56–57)
- Education: Harvard University (AB)
- Occupations: Journalist; Writer
- Spouse: David James Sorkin (m. 2017)

Amy Davidson Sorkin (formerly Amy Davidson; born 1969 or 1970) is an American author, journalist and magazine editor.

== Biography ==
Amy Davidson grew up in New York City. She graduated from Hunter College High School, and attended Harvard University, where she received an AB in Social Studies. Before joining The New Yorker, she lived and worked in Germany.

Davidson joined The New Yorker magazine in 1995. In 1997, she became co-deputy head of the magazine's fact-checking department; in 2000, she was named an associate editor; in 2003, she was named senior editor. She became a staff writer in 2015 and focuses on politics and international affairs. Her editing contributions to The New Yorker have won the National Magazine Award and the George Polk Award. She is a member of the Council on Foreign Relations.

== Personal life ==
Amy Davidson and David James Sorkin, the general counsel of Kohlberg Kravis Roberts, were married on June 24, 2017, in a Jewish ceremony in Manhattan at the New-York Historical Society. Subsequently, she began to publish under the name Amy Davidson Sorkin.

Davidson Sorkin's first marriage ended with the death of her husband.
