= Illinois Theatre Center =

Theater in Chicago, Illinois, United States

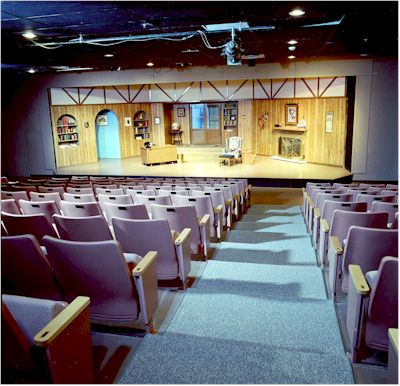
Illinois Theatre Center

The Illinois Theatre Center (ITC) was a theater in the southern Chicago suburb of Park Forest which began operation in 1976. In 1999, ITC moved to a state-of-the-art facility in downtown Park Forest, Illinois at 371 Artists Walk in the former Park Forest Plaza from their previous location in the basement of the Park Forest Public Library.

ITC was founded in 1976 by Steve and Etel Billig as the first Actor's Equity professional theater in the far South Suburbs of the Chicago metropolitan area.

In addition to its Mainstage series of six plays, ITC offered a Script-in-Hand series of play readings, a free summer outdoor Shakespeare production, and a Summerfest musical. The ITC Drama School offered several classes for adults, teens and children, as well as a summer arts camp, Project S.A.M. (Summer Arts Marathon).

In April 2012, faced with sizable debts due to drastically reduced ticket sales and donations, combined with the death of co-founder Etel Billig, the board of directors decided to close the theatre. The theatre had produced 247 Mainstage shows, 42 Summerfest shows, plus numerous workshops, children's theatre, etc.
