= Etel Billig =

American actress and director (1932–2012)

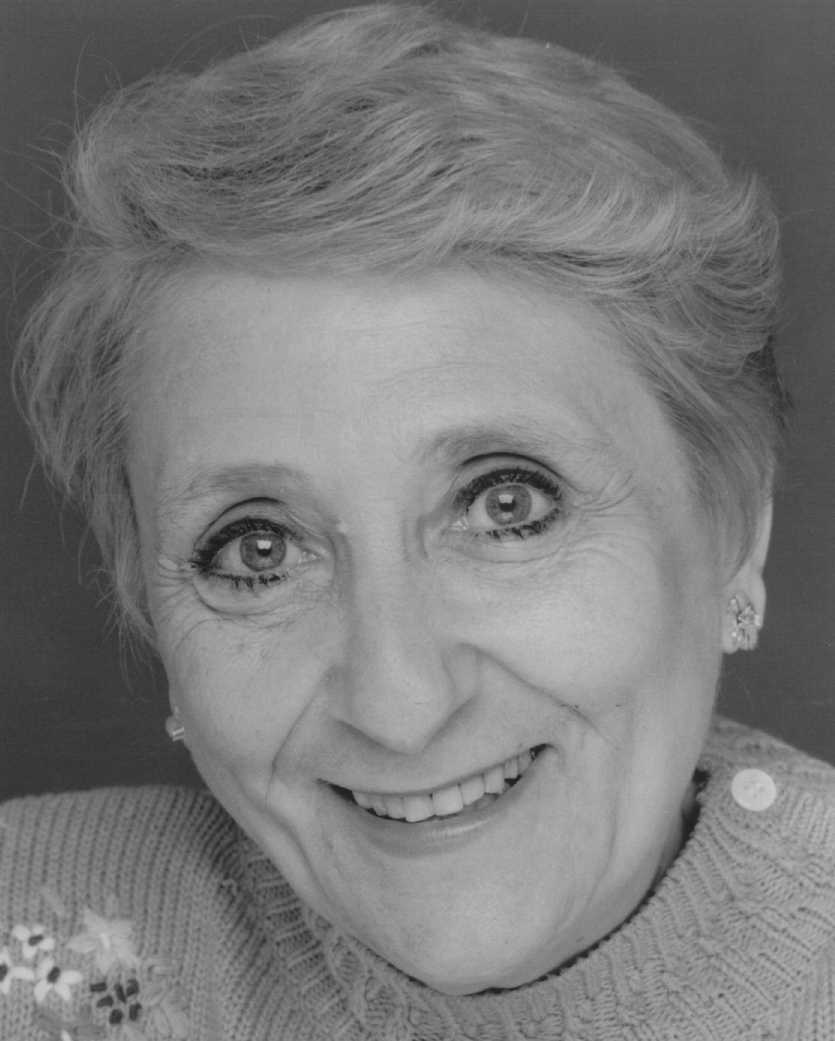
Etel Billig

Etel Billig (December 16, 1932 – March 28, 2012) was an American actress and director; her career spanned more than 60 years. She founded Illinois Theatre Center (ITC) in 1976 with her husband, Steven.

For more than three decades she appeared in or directed over 120 productions at the Illinois Theatre Center. Her other Chicago-area theatre credits included roles at The Goodman, Wisdom Bridge, Court, Drury Lane Oakbrook, Candlelight, Forum and Body Politic Theatres. She was also active in film and TV work, and taught theatre at Prairie State College. She served as the President of the Southland Regional Arts Council and as a member of the Theatre Advisory Panel of the Illinois Arts Council. She received numerous awards for her contributions to the arts.

== Death ==
She died at age 79 after being stricken with a brain aneurysm while at her theater.
