= Sturt =

Sturt may refer to:

- Sturt (surname)
- Sturt (biology), a unit of measurement in embryology named for Alfred Sturtevant

Places and things named after Charles Sturt, a British explorer of Australia, include:

== Australia ==
- Sturt Highway, a national highway in New South Wales, Victoria, and South Australia.

=== New South Wales ===
- Sturt National Park, New South Wales
- Charles Sturt University, a university in Wagga Wagga
- Electoral district of Sturt (New South Wales), former New South Wales Legislative Assembly electorate

=== Queensland ===
- Sturt, Queensland, a locality in the Shire of Boulia

=== South Australia ===
- Sturt, South Australia, a suburb of Adelaide
- Sturt Football Club, an Australian Rules Football club
- Sturt Cricket Club
- Sturt River, Adelaide
- Sturt Street, Adelaide
- City of Charles Sturt, a city
- Point Sturt, a town
- Division of Sturt, a federal electoral district in South Australia
- Electoral district of Sturt (South Australia), former South Australian House of Assembly electorate

Not to be confused with the former Electoral district of Sturt (New South Wales)

== See also ==
- Stuart (disambiguation)
- Sterte
