= Proto-Italic verbs =

Part of speech in Proto-Italic grammar

In the Proto-Italic language, verb conjugations were a complex system of inflectional morphology with conjugation according to mood, voice, tense, person, and number.

== Present ==
The South Picene form videtas possibly reflects a second-person plural present active indicative ending *-tās, which is incongruent with the Latin ending -tis. Alternatively, the South Picene form has been interpreted as an imperative or a second-person preterite form. Nevertheless, accepting the view that the term is indeed a second-person plural form, Weiss suggests that Proto-Italic perhaps possessed the primary second-person dual and plural endings *-tas and *-tes alongside the secondary second-person dual and plural endings *-tā and *-te. Weiss argues that Sabellic generalized the dual forms and leveled the *-ā from the secondary to the primary endings, whereas Latin continued the original plural forms. There is evidence of a similar development in Umbrian, where the second-person plural imperative ending -tu may reflect an original Proto-Indo-European dual form *-tā, which could imply that Umbrian also generalized the dual for the plural. Paelignian, a Sabellic language of the Oscan group, contains the second-person plural imperative form eite (“go”), which could display the inherited PIE second-person plural ending *-te, although it is also possible that this specific form was borrowed from Latin.

The Proto-Indo-European mediopassive second-person singular ending *-th₂e perhaps shifted to *-so under the influence of the second-person singular active. Afterwards, the pre-form *-so would have rhotacized into Latin passive ending -re. Alternatively, the linguist Kazuhiko Yoshida reconstructs for Proto-Indo-European a second-person singular mediopassive ending *-th₂o, which he suggests—in Italic—evolved into *-to, which then shifted to *-so under the influence of the second-person singular ending. The alternative Latin passive ending -ris perhaps emerged as the result of later enlargement with the PIE athematic active ending *-s. In some Latin dialects, the remodeling occurred prior to the weakening of word-final *-o, producing a proto-form *-ros, yielding -rus, as reflected in the form spatiarus ("walk about"). Both Sabellic and Latin also innovated second-person plural passive forms marked by a base -m-, as reflected in the Latin ending -mini. The historical development of this form is unclear, though it may derive from the nominative plural of a Proto-Indo-European mediopassive participle *-mh₁mno-, which perhaps yielded Proto-Italic *-manoi, whence perhaps Latin -mini.

In the third-person plural, Latin has generalized the original thematic ending *-ont(i), even to originally athematic forms such as sunt (< PIE *h₁sénti), whereas Sabellic generalized the athematic ending *-ent(i), such as in Oscan fiie(n)t. Sabellic perhaps innovated the new third-person mediopassive ending *-(n)tir, which is continued in Umbrian as the endings -ter and -te. South Picene qolofítur (“is erected?”), however, may show a similar development of the third-person singular passive as Latin. Nevertheless, in other Sabellic languages, the new ending was utilized in the primary tenses, whereas the original ending *-(n)tor was restricted to secondary forms. Thus, endings such -tu and -ntur, persist in Umbrian, but only in the passive subjunctive. According to the linguist James Clackson, Proto-Sabellic perhaps developed separate primary and secondary third-person passive endings *-(n)tir and *-(n)tor, the latter of which was secondarily generalized to all passive forms in South Picene. Clackson proposes that, in contrast, the Oscan group of languages generalized the Proto-Sabellic primary forms to the entire passive paradigm. Hence, Paelignian reveals terms such as the imperfect subjunctive upsaseter (“might be built”). Regarding the ultimate origin of these new endings, One theory suggests that the they perhaps emerged on the model of the third-person form *-(n)ti. Alternatively, it has been proposed that the Sabellic forms reflect innovative *-(n)tōr, itself possibly adapted to the vocalism of the first-person singular passive ending *-ōr.

=== Imperfect ===
To mark the imperfect, a new past indicative suffix of *-βā- was created in the Italic languages. This morpheme is continued in Latin terms such as portābant and possibly by the Oscan form fufans ("they were"). It is also potentially present in the form profafạ-, which appears on a broken inscription in the Vestinian language. In Classical Latin, imperfect forms of this type for the first and second conjugations are analyzable as the verb stem plus the -bā- infix, as in amaābam and monēbam. In contrast, third conjugation forms such as legēbam and some fourth conjugation forms such as veniēbam contain an -ē- vowel that is not otherwise apart of the stem. However, there is attestation of fourth conjugation imperfect forms such as scībam in the works of Old Latin authors such as Plautus and Terence, who utilized this unique type of -ībam imperfect instead of the standard Classical forms. According to the philologist Wolfgang de Melo, it is likely that Classical forms such as sciēbam were a later innovation on the model of second conjugation forms such as gaudēbam after the suffix had been reanalyzed as -ēbam instead of -bam.

The new suffix was itself perhaps from the combination of the root *bʰuH- ("to be") and the same *ā-extension found in the imperfect forms of the verb sum (i.e. erās). If a connection between the imperfective suffix and the root *bʰuH- is accepted, then a connection with fufans becomes problematic. This stem of this Oscan verb is also typically derived from *bʰuH-, in which case, it would perhaps be unlikely for the term to be modified with a suffix derived from the same root. It is often presumed that the earlier form of this suffix took the shape *bʰŭ̄ā-, itself possibly continued by rare Latin forms such as fuāt and negative imperatives such as nē fuās, though this connection requires a reduction to *-fā- in enclitic position. The exact Indo-European origin of the form *bʰŭ̄ā- is unclear; it is sometimes considered a reflex of an aorist belonging to a root *bʰweh₂-, which is perhaps a regularized form of the root *bʰuH-. Sihler is, however, critical of the aorist explanation for this formation, arguing that aorists otherwise develop into Latin perfects and it would be unusual for a perfective formation denoting completed action to evolve into an imperfective term describing continuous action.

The form *bʰŭ̄ā- perhaps appeared in set phrases wherein in functioned alongside other verbs, with which it may have eventually merged. Similar processes probably underlie the future forms in various Romance languages: Proto-Romance forms such as *cantare habyo, for instance, yielded French future forms such as chanterai. If such a development occurred in Proto-Italic, according to Sihler, the exact series of necessary sound changes and analogical remodeling required would be both complex and unique to the particular phrases featuring *bʰŭ̄ā-, thereby inhibiting any attempt to reconstruct the pre-history of this formation. One theory suggests that the particular set phrase in question originally consisted of an infinitive term alongside a form of *bʰŭ̄ā- (e.g. *amāzi bʰwām). However, sentences containing an infinitive combined with any form of esse ("to be") are otherwise entirely unknown in Latin, excluding impersonal constructions (i.e. "scire est," "one may know"). It has also been suggested that the morpheme was affixed to the bare verbal root (e.g. amā- + *bʰwām), though this theory is itself marred by the lack of any parallel instances wherein the verbal root functioned as an independent entity in Latin. Alternatively, the linguist Phillip Baldi has suggested that the sequence *-bʰw- perhaps shifted into *-bʰ- in rapid speech, thereby allowing for a phrase such as amās *bʰwām to develop into amās *bʰām, whereafter the *-s- would be deleted prior to a voiced stop, ultimately yielding the attested form amābam. In further support of this theory, Baldi notes that participles can freely mix with inflected forms of the verb esse in Latin.

Independently, within the Latino-Faliscan languages, a new future tense marked by the same -b- infix was created on the basis of the b-imperfect (e.g. eram, erō; amabō, amabō). The new b-future displaced the inherited future forms for the first and second conjugations sometime in Latin prehistory, whereas it saw much more limited success in the third and fourth conjugations. No b-futures survive for the third conjugation, whereas there are some attested fourth conjugation b-futures in Old Latin writers such as Plautus and Terence, who use forms such as scībis and scībō, though such terms are still uncommon.

=== Subjunctive ===
==== Present subjunctive ====
During the transition from Proto-Indo-European to Latin and Sabellic, the subjunctive and optative were merged, resulting in the general Italic subjunctive. However, the linguist Frederick Kortlandt disputes whether the optative had been lost by the time of Proto-Italic, noting that the continuation of optative forms may be attested in terms such as Latin faxīm, which perhaps continues the Proto-Indo-European athematic optative infix *-yéh₁-. This same athematic infix is probably also reflected in the subjunctive forms of the irregular verbs sum ("to be"), edō ("to eat"), and volō ("to want") (*h₁syéh₁m̥ > Old Latin siem). It is possible that the original Proto-Indo-European optative forms the basis for the mood known in Latin as the subjunctive, whereas the original Proto-Indo-European subjunctive paradigm gave rise to the standard Latin future. If the PIE subjunctive is reconstructed with alternation between the *ō and *ē vowels in the inflectional endings, then the ē-vowel must have been generalized throughout the entire paradigm in Latin, thus yielding inflectional endings such as -ēmus (e.g. legēmus) in contrast to Ancient Greek -ωμεν ("-ōmen;" e.g. λέγωμεν, "légōmen").

The Latin first conjugation marks its subjunctive endings utilizing the morpheme ē, such as in amēs, a subjunctive form of amō. It is possible that this paradigm derives directly from the Proto-Indo-European thematic subjunctive of verbs marked by the suffix *-eh₂yéti or from the athematic optative morpheme *-yéh₁-. According to the linguist Jay Jasanoff, a proponent of the latter hypothesis, the Latin ē-subjunctive spread from the small class of verbs that originated from athematic *h₂-factitives. In this scenario, a Latin subjunctive such as novē- (subjunctive of novō, "to make new") would derive from Proto-Italic *nowāē-, itself from an athematic optative *néweh₂yeh₁-. Regardless, in either case, the inevitable Proto-Italic first conjugation sequence *-ājē- could have perhaps have, following the loss of intervocalic yod, contracted into Latin -ē-. Such a contraction would be unusual for Latin, as the expected outcome of a sequence *-āē- would be *-ā-, which would render the present subjunctive and indicative paradigms identical. To resolve this issue, Rix presumes that the irregular sound development served to prevent the present indicative and subjunctive from becoming indistinguishable. Alternatively, Sihler posits that the sequence *-ā(j)ē- metathesized to *-ē(j)ā- under the influence of optative forms such as *monējās. The proposed contraction did not occur in the Sabellic branch, thereby permitting first conjugation subjunctive formations such as Umbrian kuraia, the ending of which derives from earlier *-ā-ē-ā-d.

All other Latin conjugations form their subjunctive paradigms utilizing the morpheme ā, such as in Latin videātis, a subjunctive form of videō. Likewise, terms such as Umbrian neiřhabas attest to the existence of a similar formation in Sabellic. Outside of Italic, the a-subjunctive may be paralleled in Old Irish—compare Old Irish subjunctive forms such as bera to the Latin equivalent ferat. In Old Irish, the a-subjunctive is formed from the verbal root itself, which is paralleled by a select few archaic formations in Italic, such as Hernican hvidas and Old Latin advenās. Traditionally, the a-subjunctive has been interpreted as an Italo-Celtic development which possibly ousted the original Proto-Indo-European thematic optative. However, this theory is controversial as it provides no sufficient explanation for the independent development of the ā-morpheme in Italo-Celtic. Moreover, Kortlandt suggests that the Old Irish and Latin a-subjunctive forms cannot be derived from a single paradigm. For instance, Kortlandt notes that the hypothetical pre-forms *bherām, *bherās, *bherāt, though capable of producing Latin ferām, ferās, and ferāt, would output Old Irish *beir, *bera, and *ber, instead of the attested forms ber, berae, and bera.

The linguist Warren Cowgill has proposed that, like the other attested Latin subjunctives, the origin of this formation lies in the Proto-Indo-European optative. According to Cowgill, a PIE optative form such as *-oyH- would yield early Proto-Italic *-oja-, whence *-oa-, which would perhaps contract into the ā-subjunctive. According to Rix, the sequence *-oa- had probably already contracted in late Proto-Italic in certain situations, such as perhaps groups of three adjacent vowels (e.g. *moneoa-). If the subjunctive origin of the future paradigm is accepted, then the expected first-person singular future ending would be *-ō, which—according to Sihler—ought to have been dropped in favor of -ām so as to avoid homophony with the present indicative. However, the ultimate origin of the form -am still remains unclear.

==== Imperfect subjunctive ====
The Italic languages innovated an imperfect subjunctive marker *-sē-, as reflected by Paelignian upsaseter, Oscan patensíns, and the Latin panderent. It is, however, unattested in Venetic or Umbrian. In Latin, the suffix underwent rhotacism, thereby surfacing as -rē- (e.g. amārēs), though the form essēs perhaps preserves the original sigmatic nature of the morpheme. The origin of the Italic imperfect subjunctive remains unknown and there are no other parallel formations from the rest of the Indo-European family. Most of the attempts to etymologize the infix *-sē- have segmented the morpheme into *-s- and *-ē-. Historically, the *s-element has been connected with either an aorist *ē-subjunctive or desiderative, though desideratives yielded the Latin sigmatic future, the PIE aorist is otherwise only known to have formed a short-vowel subjunctive, and also subjunctives themselves otherwise produced Latin futures. The *ē-component has been connected with the athematic optative infix *-yéh₁-, but the sequence *-si- did not regularly yield Latin -s- and there is no clear impetus for any analogical remodeling.

==== Subjunctive syntax ====
Within both Latino-Faliscan and Sabellic, the tense and mood of the verb in the subordinate clause was determined by the governing verb of the main clause, not by the semantics of the subordinate clauses themselves. For instance, in the Latin phrase "imperavi ut venires," meaning " I have ordered you to come," the past imperfect tense is used for the subjunctive to reflect the past perfect tense of the main clause. In Oscan, the phrase "kumbened thesavrúm pún patensins muinikad tanginúd patensíns"—meaning "it was agreed that the treasury, when they opened it, by a joint decision they should open"—utilizes the perfect form kumbened in the main clause and the imperfect subjunctive form patensíns in the main clause.

=== Sigmatic future and aorist ===
Proto-Italic may have developed a type of sigmatic future formation, which is itself possibly reflected in the Old Latin and Sabellic sigmatic futures. For instance, compare the Old Latin sigmatic future form faxō to the standard Classical Latin non-sigmatic future faciam. The ultimate source of the sigmatic forms is unclear. The linguist Reiner Lipp suggests that the s-infix future in Proto-Italic continued an originally athematic paradigm, arguing that the Old Latin sigmatic aorist subjunctive forms (i.e. faxim, faxis, etc) reflect the Proto-Indo-European athematic optative infix *-ih₁-. The possibly s-future forms in Sabellic also may display athematic inflectional endings, such as in the Oscan and Umbrian future form fust, which Lipp argues may reflect an older Proto-Italic from *fū-s-ti. Despite the possible athematic origins of certain forms, the sigmatic future paradigm in Old Latin was broadly thematic, perhaps indicating that it underwent a partial thematicization process in Proto-Italic, before eventually becoming completely thematicized during the transition into Old Latin. However, the linguist Tobias Søborg argues that the Sabellic s-future could have emerged due to the syncope of an earlier thematic paradigm, thereby allowing for a stronger connection between the two Italic subbranches. In support of his theory, Søborg cites the Umbrian future form eest, which he derives from an earlier thematic term *h₁éyset(i), though it has also been derived from earlier *h₁eyst.

Synchronically, sigmatic futures can be understood as the combination of the stem of the perfect passive participle, the s-infix, and the inflection endings (e.g. ius-sus and iussō). Newer sigmatic futures may have formed according to this model. For instance, the verb rumpō produces the sigmatic future rupsō, which perhaps lost the -m- due to the influence of the participle ruptus. Lipp argues that this pattern must have begun producing innovative formations already by the pre-Proto-Italic period. For instance, the Old Latin sigmatic future term noxō may derive from the medial syncope of an earlier form *noke-s-, itself possibly formed from Proto-Italic *nokeō. However, the Sabellic s-future may have been formed directly to the present stem and not to a stem deprived of any markers of present tense. For example, the Oscan s-future didest was possibly formed from the stem of Proto-Italic *didō. Thus, the Sabellic and Latin sigmatic futures may reflect separate Proto-Italic paradigms, although Lipps suggests that the s-futures in Sabellic derive from the same source as the Latin sigmatic forms and merely underwent a post-Proto-Italic remodeling.

The linguist Michiel de Vaan posits that the source for both the Latin and Sabellic sigmatic futures may have been Proto-Indo-European suffix *-(e)s-, which perhaps could form either athematic hysterokinetic zero-grade presents or athematic lengthened e-grade aorists. According to de Vaan, the sigmatic form faxō may reflect a pre-form *fak-es-, which de Vaan suggests is also attested in Latin facessō. In Sabellic, this suffix may have become generalized as the standard future-forming morpheme affixed to the present stem of a verb, perhaps resulting in terms such as Oscan pertemest and Umbrian ferest. Based on this model, Kortlandt postulates that the Osco-Umbrian term fust reflects Proto-Italic *fu-es-/*fu-s-, although Lipp argues that this paradigm should regularly produce *fuw-es-t in Sabellic. Furthermore, the existence of such a suffix in Proto-Indo-European is contentious due to a lack of comparative evidence.

The Old Latin sigmatic future has been related to a Proto-Indo-European s-desiderative suffix. There is semantic precedent in other Indo-European languages for a shift from a desiderative to a future meaning—compare the Ancient Greek s-future, such as in the Ancient Greek future form δήξομαι ("dḗxomai"), which may derive from the desiderative suffix *-(h₁)seti. However,de Melo argues that a desiderative origin should produce a simple future tense without aspectual markers. Lipp suggests that the Old Latin sigmatic future tense may have been characterized by the terminative aspect, meaning that it potentially described actions which were to be completed in the future (e.g. "will get it done"). According to Lipp, the terminative meaning of the Latin sigmatic future may have naturally evolved from the Proto-Indo-European desiderative, which possibly described motion towards the completion of an action (e.g. "going to do"). Morphologically, a derivation from the suffix *-(h₁)seti is problematic: Søborg notes that the Latin terms show no evidence of the laryngeal, although this irregularity could itself be explained if the paradigm was generalized based on terms in which the laryngeal was lost due to the presence of obstruents in the stem. Furthermore, non-aoristic sigmatic formations in other Indo-European language generally require the e-grade of the root, whereas the Latin s-future often shows the zero-grade.

No other Indo-European cognates provide a clear morphological match for the sigmatic future in Latin. In Old Irish and Vedic Sanskrit there is evidence for a thematic zero-grade paradigm with initial reduplication and a sigmatic suffix (see Sanskrit cíkitsati), although de Melo argues that the lack of reduplication in Latin and the indications of an originally athematic paradigm complicate a possible connection between these terms. Kortlandt argues that the Old Irish s-subjunctive holds athematic origins and thus may serve as a parallel to the Latin s-future. Moreover, Kortlandt connects the future forms in East Baltic, which he argues to have derived from an earlier subjunctive paradigm, and the Tocharian s-future, which may represent a thematicized class of formerly athematic sigmatic verbs. The linguists Jeremey Clackson and Geoffrey Horrocks argue that the sigmatic future and aorist in Latin may simultaneously derive from aorist and desiderative formations, whose morphology and semantics were merged and levelled as their origins were obfuscated by extensive phonological shifts.

The sigmatic future indicative may have derived from the subjunctive of a Proto-Indo-European sigmatic aorist, and the Latin sigmatic aorist subjunctive may have derived from the optative of a Proto-Indo-European sigmatic aorist. If this theory is accepted, then the first sigmatic forms may have emerged prior to the aorist-perfect merger in Latin. Certain verbs in Latin such as serpō contain both sigmatic perfects and futures, perhaps indicating that—at least with these terms specifically—the s-futures are older formations that may have been modeled after the Proto-Italic aorist. However, the Proto-Indo-European sigmatic aorist required the lengthened e-grade, whereas Latin sigmatic perfects generally reflect the zero-grade. For instance, the most frequently attested Latin sigmatic future, faxō, derives from the root *dʰeh₁-k-, whose expected sigmatic aorist *dʰḗh₁kst would regularly produce Proto-Italic *fēks- not *faks-. Additionally, the verb faciō has a perfect form fēcī that itself most likely reflects a root aorist. It is possible that Proto-Italic may have preserved both an s-aorist and a root aorist; such a development would not be unparalleled in Indo-European as other languages such as Ancient Greek can also continue both types of aorist. Nevertheless, de Melo still argues that it is unlikely Latin would continue both root and sigmatic aorists.

The conflict between sigmatic forms such as faxō and perfects based on older root aorists such as fēcī may also be resolved if the former type was an innovative formation not directly based on a Proto-Italic aorist. Alternatively, de Melo proposes that lengthened grade aorists (i.e. "*dḗyḱst"), which also had a secondary full-grade stem (i.e. *déyḱsn̥t"), may have shortened according to Osthoff's law, thereby removing the distinguishing feature between the aorists and full-grade thematic presents (i.e. Proto-Italic *deikō). This hypothetical development could have caused the aorists to be reanalyzed as sigmatic forms belonging to the present stem. Consequently, when new sigmatic terms were created—such as faxō—they utilized the present stem, and not the aorist. Lipp suggests that the form faxō may have emerged via the addition of the s-suffix to the stem fac- found in the term factus, which is the perfect passive participle to the term faciō.

Lipp disputes the aoristic explanation for the Latin sigmatic future, arguing that the sigmatic forms lack a connection to perfectivity that would be expected should the terms have originated from the aorist. In particular, Lipp cites two passages: "opsecro, ne quid in te mali faxit ira percita." which he translates as "I beseech thee, lest blind rage do in thee some evil," and "ne boa noxit," which he translates as "may a varicose vein not hurt." However, de Melo argues that—in subordinate clauses—the Latin sigmatic future may have functioned similarly to the future perfect tense, which marked actions as occurring prior to a specified point in the future. De Melo notes that—like future perfects—sigmatic forms are typically positioned in conditional clauses dependent upon a main clause with a simple future tense. Furthermore, sigmatic forms are often utilized in tandem with future perfect terms. For example, Plautus writes "Si hercle tu ex istoc loco digitum transvorsum aut unguem latum excesseris aut si respexis," which de Melo translates "By Hercules, if you shall have gone a finger's or a nail's breadth from your place, or if you shall have looked back." In this passage, the future perfect form "excesseris" is situated nearby the sigmatic form "respexis," perhaps implying a similar temporal value. According to de Melo, this future perfect meaning is semantically more easily traceable to the perfective aspect of the Proto-Indo-European aorist rather than any desiderative meaning. Nevertheless, the linguist Davide Bertocci argues that the future perfect meaning of the sigmatic forms contradicts a direct derivation from the Proto-Indo-European aorist, as the expression of anteriority is not exclusively concerned with aspect. Henceforth, Bertocci explains the s-infix as a preterital marker and not an aoristic morpheme.

The sigmatic aorist subjunctive and perfect subjunctive also frequently appear in statements that express specifically prohibitive commands (e.g. "Ne dixis istuc," "do not say that"), although they are not used for other types of hortatory statements. De Melo suggests that this similarity could be explained if the sigmatic and perfect subjunctives shared a common origin. Since the perfect in Latin was most likely produced as a merger of the Proto-Indo-European aorist and stative, and because its usage in non-past prohibitions aligns with the semantics of the aorist, de Melo also postulates an aoristic source for the sigmatic forms in Latin. According to de Melo, the future perfect and perfect subjunctive forms may have once not necessarily expressed anteriority. In support of this theory, de Melo notes the existences of set phrases such as "nē fēcerīs" ("do not do [it]"), which appears to lack a past meaning and instead merely convey a perfective meaning. De Melo postulates that the shift of the future perfect towards expressions of anteriority occurred due to the semantic influence of the standard perfect tense, which usually functioned as a preterite. Nevertheless, de Melo argues that once the future perfect had evolved a specifically anterior meaning, the sigmatic future and aorist forms were—due to their perfective origins—were repurposed to describe non-specifically anterior perfective meanings. According to this theory, the development must have occurred after the Proto-Italic stage, as the standard Classical Latin future perfect tense and perfect subjunctive are both marked by infix -er- (i.e. dīxerō), a suffix of ultimately unclear origin that—due to its absence from Sabellic—certainly could not have appeared before the Proto-Latino-Faliscan stage.

== Perfective formations ==
During the transition from Proto-Indo-European into the Sabellic and Latino-Faliscan languages, the aorist and perfect merged into a single tense, referred to as the perfect in Latin and Sabellic grammar. In Latin and Sabellic, the perfect tense of a verb consists of a unique perfect stem to which the inflectional endings are affixed. To form these perfect stems, both Italic branches often reused original aorist or perfect stems. In addition, there were some new innovations within the perfective aspect, with the -v- perfect (in Latin amō, amāvī) and the -u- perfect (moneō, monuī) being later innovations, for example. Latin more typically preserved original sigmatic aorists, such as in the case of dīx-, whereas Sabellic often preserved original root aorists. However, neither Italic branch exclusively preserved one type of aorist or perfect stem: The Latin perfect stem dīx- continues the Proto-Indo-European s-aorist *dḗyḱst, but the perfect stem peper- continues the Proto-Indo-European reduplicated perfect *pepórh₃e, and the perfect stem iēc- continues the full-grade k-aorist *(H)yéh₁kt. Moreover, the chosen stems in the two Italic branches are usually opposite: Where Latin continues an original perfect form, Sabellic typically preserves an aorist, and vice versa. According to Rix, if a verb stem is present in both the Latino-Faliscan and Sabellic branches, the present stem is identical in 90% of cases, but the perfect in only 50% of cases.

Due to the vast array of morphological distinctions between the perfect in Sabellic and Latino-Faliscan, it is generally held in the field of Italic linguistics that the aorist-perfect merger was completed independently in the Italic daughter languages, thereby preventing the branches from inheriting one unified system common to Proto-Italic. Furthermore, since Latino-Faliscan and Sabellic consistently continue opposite perfect and aorist stems, the linguist Gerhard Meiser argues that most Proto-Italic verbs likely had both perfect and aorist forms. Meiser concludes that—in Proto-Italic—these stems may not have differed significantly in meaning, and thus, a given form was selected for preservation in the daughter languages based on morphology rather than meaning. However, the linguist Reuben Pitts proposes that Old Latin, Faliscan, and the Sabellic languages shared far more morphological similarities than linguists such as Meiser suggest. If these theories are accepted, then this may indicate a later date for the divergences between the Sabellic and Latino-Faliscan perfect systems.

Pitts argues that both Italic clades likely opted for s-aorists in situations where a reduplicated perfect was not phonotactically permissible, particularly forms that lack a syllabic nucleus. For instance, the verb "coquō" bears the s-perfect stem cox- instead of the inadmissible reduplicated perfect form *kʷokʷkʷ-. Similarly, Oscan kúmbened may preserve a thematic aorist, as opposed to the zero-grade reduplicated perfect *gʷegʷn-, which likely would have produced *bobn-. a form without a syllabic nucleus. The Latin verb fingō, though it bears an s-perfect stem finx-, may have once utilized a reduplicated perfect, as shown by the closely related Faliscan term fifiked. Furthermore, long-vowel perfect stems such as ēg- and frēg- also appear in situations in which factors such as vowels or fricatives may have ensured that any reduplicated perfect would be phonologically unacceptable. The Latin verb faciō, which formed a long-vowel perfect stem fēc-, is known to have at one point held a reduplicated perfect stem, as the Praeneste fibula attests to a form fhefhaked. However, this term may have eventually become phonotactically impermissible in Latin, perhaps—according to Pitts—due to rules within Latin concerning fricative reduplication.

Pitts cities further similarities in the long-vowel perfect formations of Sabellic and Latin. In Latin, long-vowel perfects typically display variation between short /ă/ in the present (i.e. faciō) and long /ē/ in the perfect, which—in some cases—regularly derived from a Proto-Indo-European form (i.e. fēc- < "*fēk-" < "*dʰeh₁-k-" ). However, this pattern extended to verbs where the long /ē/ would not have regularly emerged from Proto-Indo-European, such as in the Latin verb capiō, which bears the long-vowel perfect cēp- instead of the expected form "*cāp-." According to Pitts, it is likely that these unusual forms were refashioned after terms such as faciō. Pitts argues that this same sort of analogical remodeling may have affected Oscan, where the long-vowel perfect hipust contains an unexpected /p/ instead of the expected /b/, perhaps due to the influence of a stem like cēp-. He concludes that the presence of similar influences in both Oscan and Latin suggests a common origin for this shared type of long-vowel perfects.

Weiss postulates that some Latin long-vowel perfects may originate from Narten-type presents in Proto-Indo-European. In support of the Narten theory, the linguist Jay Jasanoff notes that many long-vowel perfects in Latin derive from roots that form Narten-type presents. For instance, the Old Latin perfect form "surrēg-" attests to an original long-vowel perfect for the verb "regō", which itself derives from the root "*h₃reǵ-", for which a Narten present may be attested in Sanskrit "rā́ṣṭi". An alternative hypothesis holds that long-vowel perfects derive from reduplicated forms in Proto-Indo-European. For instance, the Latin perfect stem ēd- is sometimes interpreted as a descendant of Proto-Indo-European *h₁e-h₁ód-e, although Jasanoff argues instead for a derivation from a Narten present. According to Jasanoff, the reduplication theory is sufficient to explain the Latin forms, although it does not properly explain the existence of other long–ē preterites in the rest of the Indo-European family, thereby implying that a different form served as the common origin.

=== Perfect passive ===
To the perfect passive, in both Latin and Sabellic, the perfect passive participle was combined with a present form of the verb sum ("to be"). Thus, in Latin, the sequence amātus sum means "I was loved," and amāta est means "she was loved." Likewise, in Umbrian, the sentence screihtor sent means "they were written." To form the pluperfect passive, the participle would be combined with the imperfect of the verb sum, as in Latin amātī erāmus, which means "we had been loved," and to form the future perfect passive, the participle was combined with the future forms of sum. The latter usage is attested in Sabellic, where the Umbrian phrase pihaz fust means "they will have been purified." This type of perfect passive formation can serve as the perfect active for deponent verbs, as in sequor ("to follow"), a perfect active form of which would be secūta erat, meaning "she had followed."

=== Future perfect ===
Outside of the perfect indicative, the perfect system in Latin is marked by an infix -er- before vowels (i.e. dūxerō) and -is- before consonants (i.e. dūxissem). The Sabellic languages, however, utilize the morpheme *-us- to mark their future perfect, which in Umbrian becomes -ur- antevocalically. Both forms are of unclear origin, and both have competing explanations designed to explain their provenance. Traditionally, the Latin morpheme -is- has been related to the iṣ-aorist of Sanskrit (i.e. akāṣīt), although this connection has since been rejected as the Sanskrit form is now regarded as resulting from the interaction an s-suffix and a stem ending in a laryngeal. According to the philologist Helmut Rix, both the Sabellic and Latin morphemes may derive from the univerbation of the Proto-Indo-European suffix *-wós and the verb *ezom. If this theory is accepted, then the Sabellic suffix may be connected to the Oscan future form fust; verbs such as Oscan tribarakattuset may derive from earlier *trēb-ark-ā-t-us-ed, itself possibly from *trēb-ark-ā-t-wos fust. However, the linguist Nicholas Zair notes that this theory relies on the presumed sound change of *-usfust into *-ust, which is otherwise unattested. Furthermore, Søborg argues if such univerbation did occur then, in Latin, the morpheme *-es- should have been retained in medial closed syllables. Rix proposes that *-es- was weakened to *-is- prior to univerbation (i.e. *portāwos izom. not *portāwos ezom), which may explain this discrepancy.

Jasanoff instead compares the Osco-Umbrian future perfect to the future perfect of Ancient Greek, which can be morphologically analyzed as a product of the affixation of the sigmatic marker to the perfect stem. For instance, the Ancient Greek future perfect form τεθνήξω (tethnḗxō) is merely an s-extension of the perfect formτέθνηκᾰ (téthnēkă). According to Jasanoff, it is likely that this type of sigmatic perfect was a common Italic form and probably underlies both the Sabellic and Latin future perfect paradigms. Jasanoff argues that Oscan fust probably originates as a dereduplicated form from earlier *fefust, whose stem may also be attested in Umbrian fefure. However, the identification of fefure as a future perfect term is not uncontroversial, and the word may instead constitute a third-person plural future or a third-person singular imperfect subjunctive form. Regardless, Jasanoff argues that the stem *fefu- was likely inherited from Proto-Indo-European, and it may relate to Sanskrit babhū́va. Alternatively, Kortlandt compares fefure and Oscan fifikus to reduplicated future formations in Old Irish, such as -didsiter. If fefure and fust reflect the same Proto-Sabellic term, then the dereduplication in Oscan may be paralleled by terms such as dicust, which may derive from earlier *dedik-. However, Zair argues that it is unlikely such a development would affect a perfect stem *fefu- as this shift would render the future and future perfect forms identical, thereby encouraging speakers to retain the initial reduplication as a distinctive marker.

According to Jasanoff, the perfect form *fefu- was then suffixed with the sigmatic marker, creating a new future tense with stative value. The new future perfect form *fefust would have—according to Jasanoff—been paralleled by the simple perfect *fefed, which itself may have derived from earlier *fefwed. The *-w- in the latter form may have contributed to a reanalysis of *fefust in which the *-u- was no longer considered part of the stem. Consequently, the ending may have spread to other forms and gradually become generalized as the Osco-Umbrian future perfect marker. If this development is accepted, then perhaps earlier sigmatic futures would have consisted of terms such as *dedikst, which may have then been replaced by new forms such as *dedikust, itself possibly the precursor to Umbrian dersicust. Similarly, Jasanoff proposes that the Latin future perfect emerged from the combination of an s-suffix and the perfect stem followed by the addition of epenthetic *-i- to minimize morphological confusion. For instance, pre-Latin *deikō—which held an s-perfect stem *deiks-—would have formed a future perfect stem *deiks-s-, which would have been modified into *deiksis- to differentiate the term from the identical perfect stem. Afterwards, the term would have evolved into the attested Classical Latin future perfect stem dīxer-. Once this pattern was established, the epenthetic *-i- may have spread to other paradigms that did not originally necessitate the distinguishing marker. Thus, terms such as tangō, whose archaic perfect stem was *tetag-, would have originally held a future perfect stem *tetags-, which may have then been analogically reshaped into *tetagis-, whence tetiger-.

Zair agrees that the Sabellic perfect was likely—within Proto-Sabellic—formed from the addition of a sigmatic suffix to the perfect stem. However, Zair suggests that the sigmatic marker was—at least in certain cases—added onto a perfect stem previously extended by the suffix *-ō, a development which occurred during the post-Proto-Italic period. According to Zair, roots of the shape *C(R)eH- will provide stative forms of the shape *CeC(R)oH-, whose final sequence *-oH may produce Proto-Italic *-ō, which was then reanalyzed as a component of the perfect stem. Thus, terms such as Oscan ϝουρουστ may derive from the reduplicated stative *we-wróh₁-e, itself belonging to the root *wreh₁-. This suffix may have then spread to other forms, such as Umbrian dersicust, which may derive from a pre-form *de-dik-ō-s- that possibly displaced the original perfect form *de-doik-e. The eventual completion of the aorist-perfect merger and the generalization of the aorist inflectional endings to the entire perfect tense in Oscan and Umbrian may have concealed the existence of the ō-perfect class, ensuring that the only remnants of this type survived in the future perfect paradigm. However, South Picene may have uniquely continued the original ō-perfect class, perhaps explaining the existence of South Picene forms such as opsút.

Bertocci argues that the Latin future perfect most likely originated from the sigmatic forms. According to Bertocci, the eventual emergence of the Latin split between the present and perfect systems orphaned the sigmatic forms, which could not be easily assigned to either category. Consequently, the sigmatic terms underwent a reanalysis in which—due to their anterior meaning—they were reassigned to perfect stems, perhaps giving rise to terms such as *fēk-s-, itself modeled after the perfect stem fēc-. This new stem may have been further augmented by the addition of -i-, which Bertocci suggests to have been related to the second-person singular perfect ending -isti. The result of these hypothetical developments would have been forms such as *fēk-i-s-, which may have eventually developed into the future perfect endings.

== Non-finite forms ==
=== Present active participle ===
The original Proto-Indo-European present active participle was marked by an ablauting suffix *-onts ~ *-n̥t-. In Italic, the zero-grade of the suffix was generalized to all forms. For instance, PEI forms such as *bʰern̥tey would yield Proto-Italic *ferentei, the stem of which was eventually generalized to the Latin participle ferēns ("carrying"). Such a development probably also occurred in Sabellic, as indicated by forms such as Umbrian zeřef ("sitting"). The original o-grade of the strong stem does survive in a select few fossils, such as in sōns ("guilty"), which reflects PIE *h₁sónts. Evidence for the present active participle in Osco-Umbrian is limited, though based on the few surviving forms, it appears that the Sabellic languages—like Latin—formed their participles via the additions of the -ns suffix to the verbal stem.

=== Perfect passive participle ===
The Italic languages repurposed the Proto-Indo-European adjectival suffix *-tós to form perfect passive participles. First-conjugation verbs form their perfect passive participles through the addition of the -tus suffix to the present (e.g. laudā- -> laudātus). In Latin, the perfect passive participle is combined with forms of the present, imperfect, and future forms of the verb sum ("to be") to express the perfect, pluperfect, and future perfect passive respectively. This same morphological trait is shared with Sabellic, where forms such as Umbrian screihtor sent (“they were written”) and pihaz fust. First conjugation verbs with perfects in -uī often have perfect passive participles in -(i)tus (e.g. domō, domuī, domitus; secō, secuī, sectus). These participle forms evidently reflect a pre-form of the shape *-Vtos, though the identity of the vowel remains somewhat unclear: It might have been *a, which could have resulted from the vocalization of the laryngeal in roots such as *demh₂- ("to tame"), or it might have been *e, which would have spread analogically from the second conjugation. The linguist Dag Haug notes the existence of numerous Umbrian first conjugation verbs with participles containing the vowel -e-, such as aseçeta, which is parallel to Latin sectus, and belongs to the first conjugation paradigm of *sek-ā-. Haug explains this phenomenon as the result of vowel weakening, arguing that the vowel *a weakened to e in open medial and closed final syllables. De Vaan, however, supports reconstructing the original participle form as *-etos, arguing that it might connect to the productivity of the perfect in -ed within Sabellic.

In Latin, many second-conjugation verbs form their perfect passive participles with a suffix -itus attached to the root (e.g. tacitus), which might reflect a pre-form *-etos. This type may reflect an earlier participle suffix *-itos, itself etymologically connected to the -i- of Vedic causative participles such as coditá ("driven"). Another theory holds that the causative suffix *-éyeti was reanalyzed as *-e-yeti, allowing for second conjugation participles of the shape *-e-tos to be formed by analogy with ye-presents such as *kapyéti, which exists beside *kaptós. Neither of these explanations can fully account for the entirety of the second conjugation; they can only explain the origin of the participles for old causative verbs. It is unlikely that the old causative participle suffix would have exerted analogical influence on the rest of the second conjugation, as the causative class has a marginal presence in Italic compared to the stative verbs. Regarding the stative class, Haug proposes that the vowel in the participle ending -itus originates from a suffix *-h₁tós, itself from a zero-grade variant of the stative suffix *-eh₁-. The form *-h₁tós would yield Proto-Italic *-atos, which—in Sabellic—would, according to Haug, undergo his proposed weakening of *a to *e, followed by subsequent syncopation. The syncopation would have obscured the preceding vowel weakening, though the *e vowel would survive in certain case forms, such as the nominative singular. Haug proposes that, in at least some terms, the nominative singular then exerted analogical pressure on the other case forms, resulting the reintroduction of the *e. As an example, Haug cites Umbrian taçez ("tacit, silent"), the vocalism of which was generalized to the plural form tasetur, replacing expected *taitur (< *taktōs < *taketōs). Multiple possibilities are admissible: Participles in *-itos possibly served as the source for the participles of causative verbs such as moneō ("to warn"), whereas old stative verbs such as habeō ("to hold, have") derive their participles from the vocalization of the laryngeal in the zero-grade of the stative suffix. Some second conjugation verbs in Latin form their participles through the addition of the -tus suffix to the present stem, as in dēlēre ("to destroy"), which forms a participle dēlētus. The Umbrian form uirseto may showcase the characteristic stem vowel -ē- of the second conjugation, though it could also reflect a formation in *-eto-.

Third conjugation verbs formed their participles directly on the roots, as in capiō (< PIt *kapjō), which forms a participle captus (< PIt *kaptos). There are certain apparent exceptions in Latin, such as genitus and molitus, though—diachronically—these actually conform to the pattern. They belong to laryngeal-final roots (e.g. *ǵenh₁- and *melh₂-), which could have produced participle forms such as *ǵenh₁-to- and *molh₂-to-, which would have produced Proto-Italic forms such as *genato- and *molato-. These innovative participles must have been created at an early date, as otherwise they would not show the reflex of a laryngeal. The majority of Latin fourth conjugation verbs form their perfect passive participles via the addition of -tus to the present stem, as in audītus, from audīre ("to hear"). There is evidence for a similar treatment in Umbrian: The form sarsite may continue a pre-form *sarkītos, though the parallel Latin fourth conjugation verb sarciō ("to mend") shows a participle sartus, which seemingly reflects earlier *sarktos.

=== Gerundive ===
The gerundive is a common Italic innovation, lacking any parallels elsewhere in the Indo-European family. In Latin, it is reflected in forms such as operandus ("which is to be worked"), and in Sabellic it is continued by terms such as Oscan úpsannúm and Umbrian pihaner. There is evidence that the gerundive originally functioned as a verbal adjective, as indicated by forms such as Latin rotundus ("round") and secundus ("second"). Moreover, there exists two adjectival suffixes of similar structure: -bundus and -cundus, the former of which might reflect a combination of -undus and the *-b- of the future or imperfect tense. The fossilized adjectives in -undus are associated with deponent verbs: secundus relates to sequor ("to follow"), oriundus ("descended from") belongs to orior ("to rise"), and lābundus ("falling") is connected with lābor ("to glide"). According to the linguist Jay Jasanoff, it is likely that this pattern of deponent verb beside an *-ondos adjective spread to other verbs with passive inflection. For example, a term such as *wertōr ("I am turned"), the passive of *wertō ("to turn"), could create an adjective *wertondos ("disposed to turn"). Such adjectives would have been synchronically understood as specifically associated with the passive voice, allowing for their later acquisition of a role as a type of passive participle.

Jasanoff further suggests that the suffix originally took the shape *-(V)ntinos, and it developed into Latin -Vndus via the syncope of *-i- followed by the simplification of the cluster *-ntn- to *-nn-, and then the dissimilation of the second *-n- to *-d-, eventually producing a film *-nd-. Sabellic would also have undergone the syncope of *-i- and the simplification of *-ntn- to *-nn-, the latter of which must have occurred before epenthesis and dissimilation, thus preventing the creation of forms in *-nten- to *-nken-. The syncope of *-i- itself might be dated to Proto-Italic, though the majority of developments involving syncope are usually considered post-Proto-Italic. In this particular case, however, Jasanoff argues that word-initial stress—itself a precondition for word-medial syncopation in the Italic languages—had already emerged during the common Italic period, potentially allowing for at least some instances of vowel syncopation to occur already within Proto-Italic, even if only in rapid speech or in particular environments. Regarding its ultimate etymology, Jasanoff proposes that the suffix reflects the participle ending *-onts combined with the suffixes *-is and *-nós. As an example of a possible development according to this theory, Jasanoff cites a putative participle form *sekʷont- ("following"), which could have served as the basis for an i-stem noun *sekʷont-i- ("act of following"), whence another derivative *sekʷont-i-nos ("related to following"). The linguist Romain Garnier, however, suggests that secondary i-stem derivatives to participles most usually show the zero-grade in Indo-European languages (e.g. in Vedic vasatí, which could reflect PIE *wesn̥ti-), not the full grade as required by Jasanoff.

Another, older theory—first proposed by Edgar Howard Sturtevant—connects the gerundive to the -ātar ~ -annaš class of nouns in Hittite. However, this theory requires a phonological development of *-tn- to Latin -nd-. This sound change, however, has been rejected by the majority of linguistics on the basis of evidence such as Proto-Italic *atnos (< PIE *h₂et-nó-s) and Latin penna (< PIt *petnā), though Garnier provides alternative explanations for both of these forms. According to Sihler, the metathesis of *-tn- to -nd- is attested in Latin pandō ("to reveal, open"), which he derives from earlier *patnō. Garnier reconstructs a PIE suffix of the shape *-eh₂tr̥, which he argues could have yielded Proto-Italic nouns such as a putative form *opesātor ("the act of building"), the dative singular of which could have been something such as *opesātanei. According to Garnier, this dative form might have once served as a dative of purpose, thereby expressing a meaning such as "to be built." From this term, a thematic adjective of the shape *opesātanos ("to be built") might be created, which itself would have been identified with the first conjugation within Proto-Italic. Later, also within Proto-Italic, adjectives of the type *-etnos were created analogically for the third conjugation. The expected outcome of a suffix *-ātanos, according to Garnier, would be *-ātinus, as he argues is demonstrated in forms such as prōtinus ("immediately"), which may reflect earlier *prō-tenos. To explain the Latin outcome -andus for the first conjugation, Garnier suggests analogical leveling, which also explains the lack of vowel weakening of these forms, though the relic kalendae ("the calends") shows such a development. If the suffix does reflect specifically the oblique stem of an ablauting *-tr̥ ~ *-tn- suffix in PIE, then the lack of a nominative singular gerund in Italic is trivially explainable, as the effect of sound laws would have rendered the forms so distinct as to be synchronically unidentifiable with each other, resulting in the loss of the nominative.

=== Supine ===
The supine in -um is, in origin, the accusative singular of u-stem nouns. Later, it was reanalyzed as derived from the participle, resulting in the creation of innovative supine forms such as quaesītum, which reflects the perfect passive participle quaesītus ("having been sought"), as opposed to the u-stem noun quaestus ("gain, acquisition"). Within Latin, the supine in -um functions as an infinitive when paired with verbs of motion. This usage is also attested in Sabellic, and it probably existed in PIE as it is also present in other Indo-European languages such as Old Church Slavonic and Vedic Sanskrit. The supine in -ū is usually described as an ablative form, though diachronically it might actually be a dative: In Vedic Sanskrit, the infinitive in -tave, which is cognate with the Latin supine, appears most frequently with the dative. Plautus, a 3rd-century BCE comic playwright, utilizes a supine with an unambiguously dative ending -uī, though Sihler argues that this form in particular might be as secondary formation. Due to the uncertainty regarding whether the 'ablative' supine was in origin an ablative or a dative, it is unclear whether the pre-form was *-tūd or *-tou. In the latter case, the form is probably to be identified with the unusual dative singular ending -ū, which appears in some archaic inscriptions, in contrast to the more regular fourth declension dative singular form -uī.

== Sample conjugations ==
=== First conjugation ===
This conjugation pattern was largely derived from the PIE suffix *-eh₂-yé-ti, and formed primarily denominative verbs (I.e. deriving from a noun or an adjective). The original Proto-Indo-European sequence *-eh₂-yé-ti ~ *-eh₂-yó-nti developed into Proto-Italic *-āje- ~ *-ājo-, which eventually lost the intervocalic yod and contracted into the Latin first conjugation paradigm. It is perhaps possible that the Umbrian term subocau ("to call, invoke;" perhaps from Proto-Italic *sub-wok-ājō) showcases an uncontracted first-person singular form. There was also a class of *h₂-factitives which formed verbs such as the verb *néweh₂ti, which is possibly the source for novō, novāre. Over time, this class merged with the aforementioned denominative type and was subsumed into the first conjugation. Roots with final *-(e)h₂ could also produce first-conjugation verbs, such as *(s)neh₂-, the athematic root present of which—*(s)néh₂ti—perhaps yielded Proto-Italic *(s)nāō, whence Latin nō, nāre.

Example Conjugation: *dōnā- (to give)

Tense	1st. Sing.	2nd. Sing.	3rd. Sing.	1st. Plur.	2nd. Plur.	3rd. Plur.
Present Active Indicative	*dōnāō	*dōnās	*dōnāt	*dōnāmos	*dōnātes	*dōnānt
Present Passive Indicative	*dōnāor	*dōnāzo	*dōnātor	*dōnāmor	*dōnāmanai	*dōnāntor
Present Active Subjunctive	*dōnāēm	*dōnāēs	*dōnāēd	*dōnāōmos	*dōnāētes	*dōnāōnd
Present Passive Subjunctive	*dōnāōr	*dōnāēzo	*dōnāētor	*dōnāōmor	*dōnāēmanoi	*dōnāōntor
Imperfect Active Subjunctive	*dōnāzōm	*dōnāzēs	*dōnāzēd	*dōnāzōmos	*dōnāzētes	*dōnāzōnd
Imperfect Passive Subjunctive	*dōnāzōr	*dōnāzēzo	*dōnāzētor	*dōnāzōmor	*dōnāzēmanoi	*dōnāzōntor
Present Active Imperative		*dōnā			*dōnāte	
Passive Active Imperative		*dōnāzo				
Future Active Imperative		*dōnātōd				

Participles	Present	Past
Tense	*dōnānts	*dōnātos
Verbal Nouns	tu-derivative	s-derivative
Type	*dōnātum	*dōnāzi

=== Second conjugation (causative) ===
This conjugation pattern was derived from PIE *-éyeti, which formed causative or iterative verbs from roots. For instance, Latin moneō derives from Proto-Italic *moneō, from earlier *monejō, ultimately from the Proto-Indo-European causative *monéyeti. The majority of the inflectional paradigm of this type is easily explainable as the expected outcome of vowel contraction (i.e. Latin monēs < Proto-Indo-European *monéyesi). However, it is more unclear whether the contraction of earlier *-eo- would—according to regular phonological developments—yield the ē in forms such as monēmus, itself from earlier *moneomos, from *monejomos, ultimately from Proto-Indo-European *monéyomos. Regardless, the eventual long-ē vowel is easily explainable as the result of analogical remodeling after the other conjugations, including the second-conjugation stative verbs, where endings such as *-ēmos are expected.

Semantically, Latin largely preserved verbs with originally causative meaning, such as the term noceō ("to hurt"), from Proto-Italic *nokeō, itself inherited from the Proto-Indo-European causative *noḱéyeti ("to cause death"). There are certain examples of verbs that potentially preserve original iterative meanings, such as perhaps mulgeō ("to milk"). On the basis of Latin evidence, the linguist Daniel Kölligan argues that—in Proto-Indo-European—the *-éyeti suffix formed iterative verbs when applied to roots whose semantics necessitated an agent and it formed causative verbs when attached to roots whose inherent meaning did not imply an agent. Thus, intransitive roots such as *ters- ("dry") form causatives such as Latin torreō ("to burn"), whereas transitive roots such as *dʰegʷʰ- ("to burn") formed iterative such as foveō ("to warm"). According to the linguist Chiara Bozzone, though this pattern remains true for Latin, since the underlying verbal roots were themselves largely lost by the Latin period and only retrievable on the basis of comparative evidence, it is likely this derivational class lost productivity early in Latin prehistory. Bozzone suggests that loss of productivity for this type perhaps occurred earlier in Latin prehistory than in Ancient Greek or Vedic Sanskrit, since the correspondence between a base verb and an *-éyeti derivative remain synchronically identifiable during the attested periods of those languages.

Example Conjugation: *mone- (to warn)

Tense	1st. Sing.	2nd. Sing.	3rd. Sing.	1st. Plur.	2nd. Plur.	3rd. Plur.
Present Active Indicative	*moneō	*monēs	*monēt	*moneomos	*monētes	*moneont
Present Passive Indicative	*moneor	*monēzo	*monētor	*moneomor	*monēmanoi	*moneontor
Imperfect Active Subjunctive	*monezōm	*monezе̄s	*monezе̄d	*monezōmos	*monezе̄tes	*monezōnd
Imperfect Passive Subjunctive	*monezōr	*monezе̄zo	*monezе̄tor	*monezōmor	*monezе̄manoi	*monezōntor
Active Optative	*moneām	*moneās	*moneād	*moneāmos	*moneātes	*moneānd
Passive Optative	*moneār	*moneāzo	*moneātor	*moneāmor	*moneāmanoi	*moneāntor
Present Active Imperative		*monē			*monēte	
Passive Active Imperative		*monēzo				
Future Active Imperative		*monētōd				

Participles	Present	Past
Tense	*monēnts	*monVtos
Verbal Nouns	tu-derivative	s-derivative
Type	*monVtum	*monēzi

=== Second conjugation (stative) ===
This conjugation pattern was largely derived from PIE *-éh₁ti and the extended form *-eh₁yéti, both of which originally formed stative verbs. Due to the action of sound laws, the causative and stative types merged over time. By the Latin period, only the stative function remained productive, with verbs such as albeō ("to be white") formed innovatively to terms such as albus. Also as a consequence of sound laws, Proto-Indo-European roots with an ending *-eh₁- could produce second-conjugation verbs, such as the root *pleh₁-, which gave rise to Proto-Italic *plēō.

Example Conjugation: *walē- (to be strong)

Tense	1st. Sing.	2nd. Sing.	3rd. Sing.	1st. Plur.	2nd. Plur.	3rd. Plur.
Present Active Indicative	*walēō	*walēs	*walēt	*walēmos	*walētes	*walēnt
Present Passive Indicative	*walēor	*walēzo	*walētor	*walēmor	*walēmanoi	*walēntor
Imperfect Active Subjunctive	*walēzōm	*walēzе̄s	*walēzе̄d	*walēzōmos	*walēzе̄tes	*walēzōnd
Imperfect Passive Subjunctive	*walēzōr	*walēzе̄zo	*walēzе̄tor	*walēzōmor	*walēzе̄manoi	*walēzōntor
Active Optative	*walēām	*walēās	*walēād	*walēāmos	*walēātes	*walēānd
Passive Optative	*walēār	*walēāzo	*walēātor	*walēāmor	*walēāmanoi	*walēāntor
Present Active Imperative		*walē			*walēte	
Passive Active Imperative		*walēzo				
Future Active Imperative		*walētōd				

Participles	Present	Past
Tense	*walēnts	*walatos
Verbal Nouns	tu-derivative	s-derivative
Type	*walatum	*walēzi

=== Third Conjugation ===
The third conjugation consists of a variety of inherited formations from Proto-Indo-European. PIE simple thematic root presents gave rise to third conjugation verbs, such as *wéǵʰeti, whence Proto-Italic *weɣō. This type was extremely common in late PIE, although it eventually lost its productivity by the Latin period, leaving behind only relict verbs as remnants. It is unclear whether any zero-grade root thematic presents persisted into Latin, though perhaps the verb rū̆dō serves as an example, yet the exact vocalism of this form is uncertain and thus its precise origins remain elusive. Original thematic *sḱé-presents also produced third conjugation verbs, such as Proto-Italic *porskō, from Proto-Indo-European *pr̥sḱéti. Inherited forms in Latin marked by this suffix do not show any unifying semantic themes, though forms marked by the suffixes -ēscō or -īscō display an inchoative-intransitive meaning. Furthermore, i-reduplicated thematic presents such as *ǵíǵn̥h₁eti were continued as third-conjugation verbs such as Proto-Italic *gignō. However, there is no certain trace of the e-reduplicated athematic type in Latin, save for possibly the verb reddō, which preserves some reduplicated form of the root *deh₃-, a root that is itself attested with anathematic e-reduplicated present *dédeh₃ti. Nevertheless, the Latin term itself does not provide conclusive evidence regarding the vocalism of the reduplicant in the pre-form.

Example Conjugation: *wert-e/o- (to turn)

Tense	1st. Sing.	2nd. Sing.	3rd. Sing.	1st. Plur.	2nd. Plur.	3rd. Plur.
Present Active Indicative	*wertō	*wertes	*wertet	*wertomos	*wertetes	*wertont
Present Passive Indicative	*wertor	*wertezo	*wertetor	*wertomor	*wertemanoi	*wertontor
Present Active Subjunctive		*wertе̄s	*wertе̄d	*wertōmos	*wertе̄tes	*wertōnd
Present Passive Subjunctive		*wertе̄zo	*wertе̄tor	*wertōmor	*wertе̄manoi	*wertōntor
Imperfect Active Subjunctive	*wertezōm	*wertezе̄s	*wertezе̄d	*wertezōmos	*wertezе̄tes	*wertezōnd
Imperfect Passive Subjunctive	*wertezōr	*wertezе̄zo	*wertezе̄tor	*wertezōmor	*wertezе̄manoi	*wertezōntor
Active Optative	*wertām	*wertās	*wertād	*wertāmos	*wertātes	*wertānd
Passive Optative	*wertār	*wertāzo	*wertātor	*wertāmor	*wertāmanoi	*wertāntor
Present Active Imperative		*werte			*wertete	
Passive Active Imperative		*wertezo				
Future Active Imperative		*wertetōd				

Participles	Present	Past
Tense	*wertents	*worssos
Verbal Nouns	tu-derivative	s-derivative
Type	*worssum	*wertezi

=== Fourth conjugation ===
This conjugation was derived from PIE *ye-suffix verbs, and went on to form most of Latin 4th conjugation. These forms are reconstructed according to the rules mentioned by Weiss, though other linguists have proposed alternative models of the Proto-Italic verb.

Example Conjugation: *gʷen-iō- (to come)

Tense	1st. Sing.	2nd. Sing.	3rd. Sing.	1st. Plur.	2nd. Plur.	3rd. Plur.
Present Active Indicative	*gʷeniō	*gʷenīs	*gʷenīt	*gʷenjomos	*gʷenītes	*gʷeniont
Present Passive Indicative	*gʷenior	*gʷenīzo	*gʷenītor	*gʷeniomor	*gʷenīmanoi	*gʷeniontor
Present Active Subjunctive		*gʷeniе̄s	*gʷeniе̄d	*gʷeniōmos	*gʷeniе̄tes	*gʷeniōnd
Present Passive Subjunctive		*gʷeniе̄zo	*gʷeniе̄tor	*gʷeniōmor	*gʷeniе̄manoi	*gʷeniōntor
Imperfect Active Subjunctive	*gʷenīzōm	*gʷenīzе̄s	*gʷenīzе̄d	*gʷenīzōmos	*gʷenīzе̄tes	*gʷenīzōnd
Imperfect Passive Subjunctive	*gʷenīzōr	*gʷenīzе̄zo	*gʷenīzе̄tor	*gʷenīzōmor	*gʷenīzе̄manoi	*gʷenīzōntor
Active Optative	*gʷeniām	*gʷeniās	*gʷeniād	*gʷeniāmos	*gʷeniātes	*gʷeniānd
Passive Optative	*gʷeniār	*gʷeniāzo	*gʷeniātor	*gʷeniāmor	*gʷeniāmanoi	*gʷeniāntor
Present Active Imperative		*gʷenī			*gʷenīte	
Passive Active Imperative		*gʷenīzo				
Future Active Imperative		*gʷenītōd				

Participles	Present	Past
Tense		*gʷentos
Verbal Nouns	tu-derivative	s-derivative
Type	*gʷentum	*gʷenīzi

=== Athematic verbs ===
Only a handful of verbs remained within this conjugation paradigm, derived from the original PIE Root Athematic verbs.

Example Conjugation: *ezom (copula, to be)

Tense	1st. Sing.	2nd. Sing.	3rd. Sing.	1st. Plur.	2nd. Plur.	3rd. Plur.
Present Active Indicative	*ezom	*es	*est	*(e)somos	*(e)stes	*sent
Future Active Indicative	*fuzom	*fus	*fust	*fuzomos	*fustes	*fuzent
Present Active Subjunctive	*ezom	*ezes	*ezed	*ezomos	*ezetes	*ezond
Imperfect Active Subjunctive	*fuzom, *essom	*fuzes, *esses	*fuzed, *essed	*fuzomos, *essomos	*fuzetes, *essetes	*fuzond, *essond
Active Optative	*siēm	*siēs	*siēd	*sīmos	*sītes	*sīend
Present Active Imperative		*es			*este	
Future Active Imperative		*estōd				

Participles	Present	Past
Tense	*sēnts	
Verbal Nouns	tu-derivative	s-derivative
Type		*essi

==== Conjugation of the aorist ====
The aorist in Proto-Italic is characterized by the PIE secondary endings connected to the aorist stem by the appropriate thematic vowel. These endings are best attested in Sabellic, where aorist endings generally ousted the perfect ones; Latin instead generalized the perfect endings to its aorist-derived perfects. However, Faliscan preserved the original third-person plural active aorist ending *-ont, which eventually became the third-person plural active perfect ending in Faliscan. The Latin third-person plural active perfect ending, -ērunt, has likewise been interpreted as mix of -ēre and *-ont. Though, Fortson doubts this argument, citing the lack of any inscriptional evidence for the ending *-ont in Early Latin. Minor attestation for the Proto-Italic aorist imperative may appear in the Latin term "cedō," whose latter component, "*dō," presumably reflects a Proto-Italic form that itself derives from the Proto-Indo-European aorist imperative "*déh₃." Likewise, "cette," the plural form of "cedō," may reflect a Proto-Italic form "*-date," itself from the Proto-Indo-European second person plural aorist imperative "*dh₃té."

The following stem formations for the aorist are known:

- The simple root aorist, formed by simply attaching aorist endings to an unsuffixed root. If ablaut is available for a root, the root is in the e-grade in the singular and zero-grade in the plural.
- The s-aorist, where the root in the e-grade is suffixed with -s- to make the aorist stem.

Aorist conjugations in Proto-Italic
Person and number	Endings	Root aorist *fēk-/*fak- "did, made"	s-aorist *deiks- "said"
1st Sing.	*-om	*fēkom	*deiksom
2nd Sing.	*-es	*fēkes	*deikses
3rd Sing.	*-ed	*fēked	*deiksed
1st Plur.	?	?	?
2nd Plur.	?	?	?
3rd Plur.	*-ond	*fakond	*deiksond

==== Conjugation of the perfect ====
The other main type of perfective formation in Italic was the perfect, which was derived from the Proto-Indo-European stative and had its own set of endings.

Perfect stems are created by a reduplication process where a copy syllable consisting of the first consonant of the verb root followed by e is prefixed to the root. In Italic, Vine believes that the root either is in the zero grade or has the same vowel as the present stem, but De Vaan identified at least two perfects with o-grade in the root syllable. Latin and Sabellic also both attest a tendency in which if a root has a semivowel in the middle, this semivowel replaces e in the copy syllable. If a verb root begins in *s followed by a stop consonant, both consonants appear in the copy syllable and the root syllable loses the *s.

Perfect stem formation in Italic
Root	Copy syllable	Root syllable	Perfect stem	Notes
*deh₃- "to give"	*de-	*d-	*ded-	Widely attested across Italic. Zero-grade root *-dh₃- resolves as non-syllabic when preceding a vowel.
*perh₃- "to bring forth"	*pe-	*par-	*pepar-	Reduplication with *e in the copy syllable. Vine claims that the *a in the root syllable is taken from the present stem *parj-; but this is unnecessary, as zero-grade *-prh₃- would yield *-par- anyhow.
*pewǵ- "to prick"	*pu-	*pug-	*pupug-	Semivowel instead of *e in the copy syllable.
*dʰeyǵʰ- "to form"	*θi-	*θiɣ-	*θiθiɣ-	Semivowel instead of *e in the copy syllable.
*telh₂- "to bear"	*te-	*tol-	*tetol-	Reduplication with *e in the copy syllable, but oddly, o-grade in the root syllable.
*deḱ- "to take (in)"	*de-	*dok-	*dedok-	Another perfect with o-grade in the root syllable. Corresponding Latin didicī has the copy syllable vowel replaced by i by analogy with present discō "I learn".

The perfect endings in Italic, which only survive in the Latino-Faliscan languages, are derived from the original PIE stative endings, but with an extra -i added after most of them.

An additional suffix -is- of difficult-to-trace origin was added in the evolution of Latin to the 2nd-person endings.

Perfect conjugations in Proto-Italic
Perfect	Endings	Latin endings
1st Sing.	*-ai	-ī
2nd Sing.	*-tai	-istī (Note: Extended by mystery suffix -is-)
3rd Sing.	*-ei	-īt (Note: Appears in Plautus, remodelled with -t from the present endings. Replaced by short-vowel -it derived from the aorist endings otherwise.)
1st Plur.	?	-imus (Note: Ending reshaped after the present active endings.)
2nd Plur.	*-e	-istis
3rd Plur.	*-ēri	-ēre (Note: Extended by *-ond from the aorist endings to form the usual ending -ērunt.)

=== Examples of verb derivation from PIE in Proto-Italic ===
*moneō (to warn), II°
Pronoun	Verb (present)
I	*moneō < PIE *monéyoh₂
You	*monēs < *monéyesi
He, she, it	*monēt < *monéyeti
We	*moneomos < *monéyomos
You	*monēte < *monéyete
They	*moneont < *monéyonti

*agō (to lead), III°
Pronoun	Verb (present)
I	*agō < PIE *h₂éǵoh₂
You	*ages < *h₂éǵesi
He, she, it	*aget < *h₂éǵeti
We	*agomos < *h₂éǵomos
You (all)	*agete < *h₂éǵete
They	*agont < *h₂éǵonti

*gʷəmjō (to come), IV°
Pronoun	Verb (present)
I	*gʷeniō < PIE *gʷm̥yóh₂
You	*gʷenīs < *gʷm̥yési
He, she, it	*gʷenīt < *gʷm̥yéti
We	*gʷeniomos *gʷm̥yomos
You (all)	*gʷenīte < *gʷm̥yéte
They	*gʷeniont < *gʷm̥yónti

*esom (to be), athematic
Pronoun	Verb (present)
I	*ezom < PIE *h₁ésmi
You	*es < *h₁ési
He, she, it	*est < *h₁ésti
We	*(e)somos < *h₁smós
You (all)	*(e)stes < *h₁sté
They	*sent < *h₁sénti
