= Julian Sturtevant =

Julian Sturtevant may refer to:

- Julian M. Sturtevant (1908–2005), American chemist and educator
- Julian Monson Sturtevant (1805–1886), American author and educator
