= Breslauer (disambiguation) =

Breslauer is a surname.

Breslauer may refer to:

- a resident of the city of Breslau
- Breslauer SC 08, a German association football club
- Vereinigte Breslauer Sportfreunde, a German association football club
- Breslauer Instructionen, a cataloging set of rules for scientific libraries in German-speaking countries
- Breslauer Platz/Hbf (KVB), a light rail station in Cologne, Germany
- Breslauer Tumbler, a breed of domestic pigeon
