= E. Adelaide Hahn =

American linguist (1893–1967)

- Born: April 1, 1893; New York City, U.S.
- Died: July 8, 1967 (aged 74); New York City, U.S.

Academic background
- Education: Columbia University
- Thesis: Coordination of non-coordinate elements in Vergil (1929)
- Doctoral advisor: Charles Knapp

Emma Adelaide Hahn (April 1, 1893 – July 8, 1967) was an American linguist and classicist who specialized in Latin grammar and Indo-European linguistics. She served as chair of the Hunter College Classics department for twenty-seven years and was the first woman to serve as president of the Linguistic Society of America and regarded for her "forceful" lectures given with a strong New York City accent.

== Biography ==
Hahn was born April 1, 1893, in New York City to Otto and Elenore Hahn. Elenore, an alumna of Hunter College, tutored Hahn at home up to high school level. Hahn then enrolled in the Hunter Model School (now Hunter College High School) and then Hunter College. She initially majored in mathematics, but later changed her studies to Latin, Greek, and French. She graduated from Hunter in 1915 with a B.A. having majors in Latin and French, and a minor in Greek. Two years later she graduated from Columbia University with an M.A. in 1917, and in 1929 she received her Ph.D. Her dissertation, supervised by Charles Knapp, was on grammatical elements in the writing of Virgil.

At Columbia, she enrolled in a course by Edgar Howard Sturtevant in comparative grammar of Greek and Latin. Sturtevant sparked Hahn's interest in Indo-European linguistics (particularly Hittite), which she continued to study at the LSA's summer Linguistic Institute. After Sturtevant joined the faculty at Yale University, she attended linguistic seminars at Yale taught by Leonard Bloomfield, Franklin Edgerton, Albrecht Goetze, Eduard Prokosch, and Edward Sapir.

At Hunter, after joining the classics faculty in 1921, Hahn became an assistant professor in 1925. She completed her Colombia PhD, Coordination of non-coordinate elements in Vergil, in 1929. She became an associate professor at Hunter in 1933, and a full professor in 1936. She became the chair of the classics department in 1936 and continued in this position until her retirement in 1963.

For the Linguistic Society of America, she served as a member of the Executive Committee from 1930 to 1934, as vice-president in 1940, and as president in 1946. She was the first woman to serve as LSA president.

She was also president of the New York Classical Club from 1939 to 1941, vice-president of the American Oriental Society from 1952 to 1953, and president of the Classical Association of the Atlantic States from 1960 to 1962.

Hahn's distinctive New York City accent, forceful way of speaking, and penchant for large feathered hats earned her a reputation as a "character", a colorful and unforgettable personality.

Hahn died in New York City in 1967.

== Selected works ==
- (with Edgar H. Sturtevant) A comparative grammar of the Hittite language. New Haven: Yale University Press, 1951.
- Subjunctive and optative: their origin as futures. New York: American Philological Association, 1953.
- Naming-constructions in some Indo-European languages. Cleveland: Case Western Reserve University, 1969.
