= Breslauer =

Breslauer is a German- and Yiddish-language surname literally meaning "person from Breslau", a former name for Wrocław, Poland. Notable people with the surname include:

- Alfred Breslauer (1866–1954), German architect of Jewish origin
- Bernard H. Breslauer (1918–2004), German antiquarian book dealer and collector
- Chrystian Breslauer (1802–1882), Polish painter and art pedagogue
- Birth name of Gabriel Barkay, Israeli archeologer
- George W. Breslauer (born 1946), American political scientist
- Hans Karl Breslauer (1888–1965), Austrian film director and screenwriter
- Kenneth Breslauer (born 1947), American biochemist
- Marianne Breslauer (1909–2001), German photographer
- Mendel Breslauer (1760–1829), Silesian writer
- Rudolf Breslauer (1903–1945), German photographer of Jewish descent
