= Julian M. Sturtevant =

American chemist (1908–2005)

- Born: Julian Munson Sturtevant; August 9, 1908; New Jersey, United States
- Died: August 12, 2005 (aged 97); Seattle, Washington, United States
- Education: Columbia University; Yale University
- Spouse: Elizabeth
- Children: 2 (Bradford and Ann)
- Parent(s): Edgar Howard Sturtevant; Bessie Fitch Skinner
- Relatives: Julian Monson Sturtevant (great-grandfather); Alfred Sturtevant (uncle)
- Awards: Wilbur Cross Medal (1987)
- Scientific career
- Fields: Biothermodynamics; Thermochemistry
- Workplaces: Yale University
- Doctoral students: Kenneth Breslauer; George W. Flynn

Julian Munson Sturtevant (August 9, 1908 – August 12, 2005) was an American chemist and educator. Sturtevant was Professor Emeritus of Chemistry, Molecular Biophysics, and Biochemistry at Yale University.

== Career ==
Born in New Jersey to Edgar Howard Sturtevant, a linguistics professor at Yale University, and Bessie Fitch Skinner, the family descends from Samuel Sturtevant, an early settler of Plymouth Colony. Sturtevant's great-grandfather was Julian Monson Sturtevant, the second president of Illinois College, and his uncle was Alfred Sturtevant, a noted geneticist.

Sturtevant obtained his Bachelor of Arts from Columbia University in 1927, and his Doctor of Philosophy in chemistry from Yale in 1931. He joined the faculty there in that same year. Sturtevant chaired the department of chemistry from 1959 to 1962, and continued to teach until retirement in 1977, becoming professor emeritus of chemistry, molecular biophysics, and biochemistry.

Sturtevant was known for applying thermochemistry to the study of biology, and pioneered the collection of kinetic data for studying organic chemical reactions and designed unique calorimeters that allowed for more accurate heat measurements long before high-precision ones became available. His former student and Rutgers professor Kenneth Breslauer credited him for having "...practically founded the field of biothermodynamics."

For his work, Sturtevant received a Guggenheim Fellowship (1955), was elected to both the American Academy of Arts and Sciences and National Academy of Sciences (1973), and was awarded the Wilbur Cross Medal (1987).

== See also ==
- List of Columbia College people
- List of Guggenheim Fellowships awarded in 1955
- List of members of the National Academy of Sciences (Biochemistry)
- List of people from New Jersey
- List of Yale University people
