= George W. Breslauer =

American academic

George W. Breslauer (born March 4, 1946, in New York City, NY) is an academic in the field of social sciences and the former executive vice chancellor and provost of UC Berkeley.

== Introduction ==
Breslauer is a specialist on Soviet and Russian politics and foreign relations, within the field of political science. He is the author or editor of twelve books on these topics. He joined the faculty of the department of political science at The University of California, Berkeley in 1971, rising to full professor (1990–2014) and retiring to the honorific position of professor of the graduate school in 2014.

He is the older brother of chemist Kenneth Breslauer and the brother-in-law, through his sister, of Bob Frankford.

== Education ==
Breslauer has BA (1966), MA (1968), and PhD (1973) in political science from the University of Michigan. He also holds a certificate in Russian studies (1968).

== Awards and recognition ==
In 1997, he was awarded the Distinguished Teaching Award of the Social Sciences Division of UC Berkeley. In 1998, he was appointed chancellor's professor at UC Berkeley for “combining distinguished achievement at the highest level in research, teaching, and service.” In 2014 he was elected Fellow of the American Academy of Arts and Sciences. In 2015, he received from the UC Berkeley Academic Senate the Clark Kerr Award for distinguished leadership in higher education.

== Noteworthy positions ==
Breslauer has held positions with the following organizations: At UC Berkeley:

- Chair of the Center for Slavic and East European Studies (1984–1994)
- Chair of the department of political science (1993–1996)
- Dean of the Division of Social Sciences (1999–2006)
- Executive dean of the College of Letters and Sciences (2005–2006)
- Executive vice chancellor and provost (2006–2014)
- Faculty director, The Magnes Collection of Jewish Art and Life (2015–present)

Within the profession:

- Editor, Post-Soviet Affairs (1992–2015)
- Board of trustees of the National Council for Soviet and East European Research (1985–1991; vice chairman, 1988–1991)
- Committee on the Contributions of the Social and Behavioral Sciences to the Prevention of Nuclear War, the National Research Council
- Board of directors of the American Association for the Advancement of Slavic Studies (1990–1993; executive committee, 1991–1993)

== Professional memberships ==
- American Political Science Association
- American Association for the Advancement of Slavic Studies
- Association for Slavic, East European, and Eurasian Studies
- World Affairs Council of Northern California
- Pacific Council on International Policy
- Council on Foreign Relations (New York)
- American Academy of Arts and Sciences

== Grants and fellowships ==
Breslauer has been the recipient of the following grants and fellowships since earning his Ph.D.:

- The Hoover Institution
- The American Association for the Advancement of Slavic Studies
- The National Council for Soviet and East European Research
- Ford Foundation
- The Rockefeller Foundation
- The Carnegie Corporation
- National Academy of Sciences
- National Research Council

== About ==
Бреслауэр Джордж Уильям // Иванян Э. А. Энциклопедия российско-американских отношений. XVIII-XX века. — Москва: Международные отношения, 2001. — 696 с. — ISBN 5-7133-1045-0.
