= Edgar Howard Sturtevant =

American linguist (1875–1952)

- Born: March 7, 1875; Jacksonville, Illinois
- Died: July 1, 1952 (aged 77); Branford, Connecticut
- Known for: Indo-Hittite hypothesis; Founding member of the Linguistic Society of America; Sturtevant's paradox; Sturtevant's law
- Children: Julian M. Sturtevant

Academic background
- Education: Indiana University; University of Chicago

Academic work
- Discipline: Linguistics
- Sub-discipline: Hittite language
- Institutions: Columbia University; Yale University

Edgar Howard Sturtevant (March 7, 1875 – July 1, 1952) was an American linguist.

== Biography ==
Sturtevant was born in Jacksonville, Illinois, the older brother of Alfred Sturtevant and grandson of educator Julian Monson Sturtevant. He studied at Illinois College, where his grandfather was president, and obtained an A.B. from Indiana University Bloomington, then the University of Chicago receiving there in 1901 a Ph.D. with a dissertation on Latin case forms. He became an assistant professor of classical philology at Columbia University before joining the linguistics faculty at Yale University in 1923. In 1924, he was a member of the organizing committee for the founding, with Leonard Bloomfield and George M. Bolling, of the Linguistic Society of America (LSA).

Besides research on Native American languages and field work on the Modern American English dialects, he is the father of the Indo-Hittite hypothesis, first formulated in 1926, based on his seminal work establishing the Indo-European character of Hittite (and the related Anatolian languages), with Hittite exhibiting more archaic traits than the normally reconstructed forms for Proto-Indo-European.

He authored the first scientifically acceptable Hittite grammar with a chrestomathy and a glossary, formulated the so-called Sturtevant's law (the doubling of consonants representing Proto-Indo-European voiceless stops) and laid the foundations to what later became the Goetze–Wittmann law (the spirantization of palatal stops before u as the focal origin of the centum–satem isogloss). The 1951 revised edition of his grammar (co-authored with E. Adelaide Hahn) is still useful today, although it was superseded in 2008 by Harry A. Hoffner and Craig Melchert's Grammar of the Hittite Language, for which a second edition was published in 2024.

Sturtevant was elected to the American Philosophical Society in 1939 and the American Academy of Arts and Sciences in 1940.

Sturtevant died in Branford, Connecticut. His son, Julian M. Sturtevant, was a chemist and molecular biophysicist at Yale University.

== Selected works ==
- Sturtevant, E. H. (October 1917). Linguistic Change: An introduction to the historical study of language. Chicago, Illinois: The University of Chicago Press.
- Sturtevant, E. H. (1920, 1940). The Pronunciation of Greek and Latin: The Sounds and Accents. First edition Illinois: The University of Chicago Press, September 1920. Second edition Philadelphia: Linguistic Society of America, University of Pennsylvania, 1940.
- Sturtevant, E. H. (March 1926). "On the Position of Hittite among the Indo-European Languages". Language. 2 (1): 25–34. doi:10.2307/408784. JSTOR 408784.
- Sturtevant, Edgar Howard (June 1931). "Hittite Glossary: Words of Known or Conjectured Meaning, with Sumerian Ideograms and Accadian Words Common in Hittite Texts". Language. 7 (2). Language Monograph No. 9: 3–82. doi:10.2307/522061. JSTOR 522061.
- Sturtevant, Edgar H. (1932). "The Development of the Stops in Hittite". Journal of the American Oriental Society. 52 (1): 1–12. doi:10.2307/593573. JSTOR 593573.
- Sturtevant, Edgar H. A. (1933, 1951). A Comparative Grammar of the Hittite Language]. New Haven: Yale University Press. First edition: 1933. Revised edition co-authored with E. Adelaide Hahn: 1951.
- Sturtevant, Edgar H.; Bechtel, George (1935). A Hittite Chrestomathy. Philadelphia: Linguistic Society of America, University of Pennsylvania.
- Sturtevant, E. H. (April 1940). "Evidence for Voicing in Indo-Hittite γ". Language. 16 (2): 81–87. doi:10.2307/408942. JSTOR 408942.
- Sturtevant, Edgar H. (1942). The Indo-Hittite Laryngeals. Baltimore: Linguistic Society of America at the Waverly Press. doi:10.2307/j.ctt1x76d2x.
