= Sturt (surname) =

Sturt, as a surname, may refer to:

- Charles Sturt (1795–1869), an English explorer of Australia
- Charles Sturt (1763–1812), English politician
- Evelyn Sturt (1816–1885), English-born Superintendent of Police in Melbourne, elder brother of Charles Sturt
- Fred Sturt (born 1951), American National Football League player
- George Sturt (1863–1927), English writer on rural crafts and affairs who also wrote under the pseudonym George Bourne
- Henry Sturt (1795–1866), British landowner and politician
- Henry Sturt, 1st Baron Alington (1825–1904)
- Humphrey Sturt (c. 1725–1786), British architect
- Humphrey Sturt, 2nd Baron Alington (1859–1919), son of the 1st Baron Alington
- John Sturt (1658–1730), English engraver
- Michael Sturt, (born 1941), English businessman and cricketer
- Montague Sturt, (1876–1961), English cricketer
- Napier Sturt, 3rd Baron Alington (1896–1940), son of the 2nd Baron Alington
- William Sturt (christened 1797, date of death unknown), English cricketer
