= Sturt (biology) =

In embryology, sturt is a measure of distance. On the fate map, the further apart two regions are, the more likely the resulting structures are to form different genotypes. A difference of 1% in the ratio of differing genotypes is described as one sturt, after Alfred Henry Sturtevant.

It was named by Yoshiki Hotta and Seymour Benzer.
