= Breslau Tumbler =

Breed of pigeon

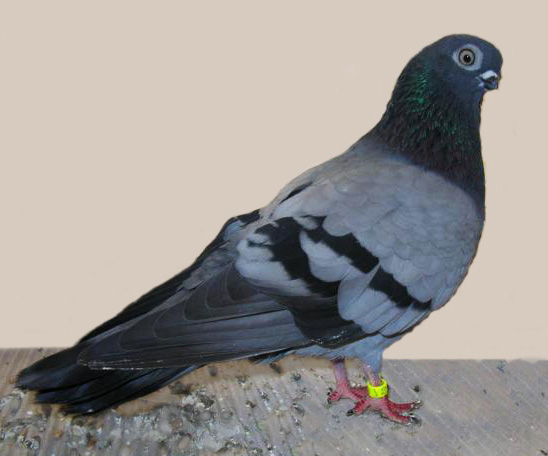
- Blue Barred Breslau Tumbler
- Conservation status: Rare
- Other names: Breslauer Tumbler
- Country of origin: Poland

Classification
- Australian Breed Group: Not listed
- US Breed Group: Tumblers, Rollers and High Flyers
- EE Breed Group: Tumbler and Highflyer

Notes
- cube shaped head

The Breslau Tumbler is a breed of domestic pigeon. Breslau Tumblers, along with other varieties of domesticated pigeons, are all descendants from the rock pigeon (Columba livia).

== Origin ==
The Breslau Tumbler was created in Breslau (now Wrocław, Poland) and is descended from the Prague (Czech) Tumbler. It is the most classic cube-headed and short-beaked of pigeon breeds.

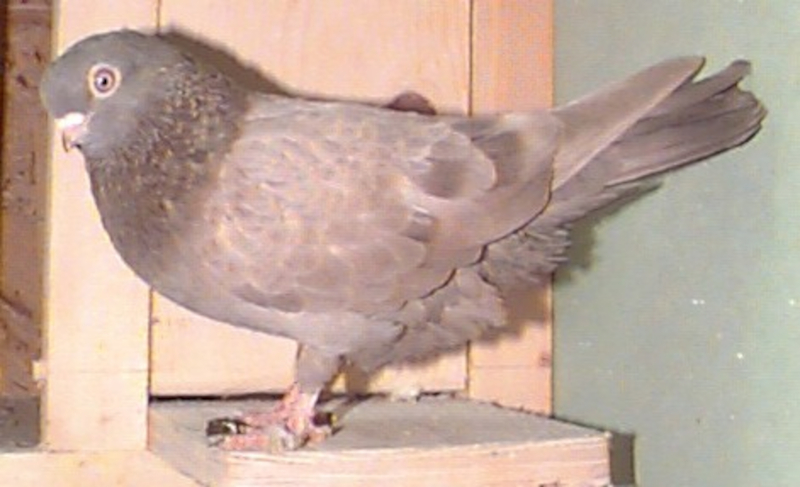
Breslaur brown hen

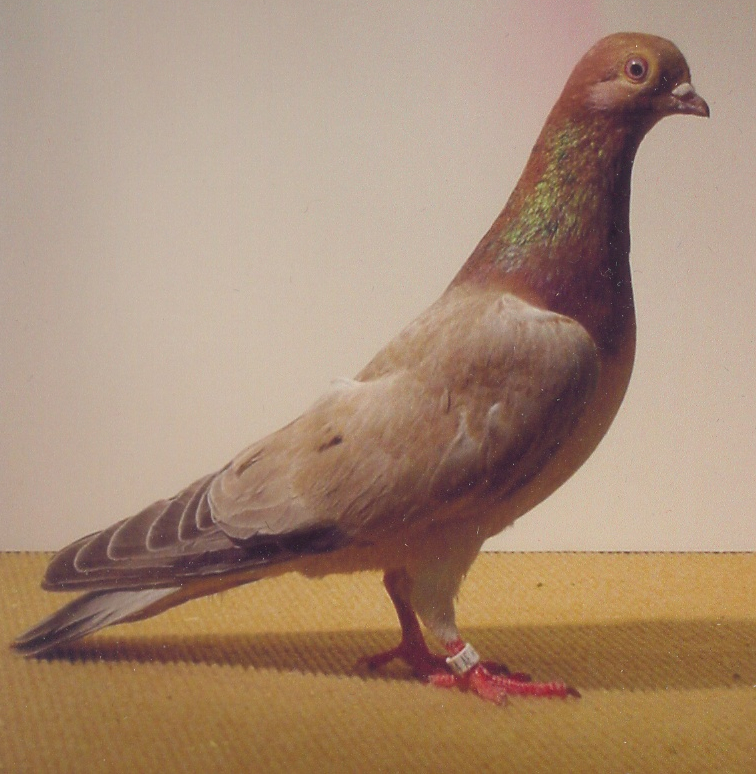
Breslaur 2004 NPA champion

== See also ==
- Pigeon Diet
- Pigeon Housing
- List of pigeon breeds
