= Alfred Sturtevant =

American biologist (1891–1970)

Alfred Henry Sturtevant
- Born: November 21, 1891; Jacksonville, Illinois
- Died: April 5, 1970 (aged 78); Pasadena, California, U.S.
- Education: Columbia University
- Known for: Gene cross-over, first genetic map
- Awards: John J. Carty Award (1965); National Medal of Science (1967)
- Scientific career
- Fields: Genetics
- Workplaces: California Institute of Technology
- Doctoral advisor: Thomas Hunt Morgan
- Doctoral students: Edward B. Lewis

Alfred Henry Sturtevant (November 21, 1891 – April 5, 1970) was an American geneticist. Sturtevant constructed the first genetic map of a chromosome in 1911. Throughout his career he worked on the organism Drosophila melanogaster with Thomas Hunt Morgan. By watching the development of flies in which the earliest cell division produced two different genomes, he measured the embryonic distance between organs in a unit which is called the sturt in his honor. On February 13, 1968, Sturtevant received the 1967 National Medal of Science from President Lyndon B. Johnson.

== Biography ==
Alfred Henry Sturtevant was born in Jacksonville, Illinois, United States on November 21, 1891, the youngest of Alfred Henry and Harriet Sturtevant's six children. His grandfather Julian Monson Sturtevant, a Yale University graduate, was a founding professor and second president of Illinois College, where his father taught mathematics.

When Sturtevant was seven years old, his father quit his teaching job and moved the family to Alabama to pursue farming. Sturtevant attended a one-room schoolhouse until entering high school in Mobile. In 1908, he enrolled at Columbia University. During this time, he lived with his older brother Edgar, a linguist, who taught nearby. Edgar taught Alfred about scholarship and research.

As a child, Sturtevant had created pedigrees of his father's horses. While in college, he read about Mendelism, which piqued Sturtevant's interest because it could explain the traits expressed in the horse pedigrees. He further pursued his interest in genetics under Thomas Hunt Morgan, who encouraged him to publish a paper of his pedigrees shown through Mendelian genetics. In 1914, Sturtevant completed his doctoral work under Morgan as well.

After earning his doctorate, Sturtevant stayed at Columbia as a research investigator for the Carnegie Institution of Washington. He joined Morgan's research team in the "fly room", in which huge advances were being made in the study of genetics through studies of the fruit fly Drosophila. In 1922, he married Phoebe Curtis Reed, and the couple subsequently had three children, the eldest of whom was William C. Sturtevant.

In 1928, Sturtevant moved to Pasadena to work at the California Institute of Technology, where he became a Professor of Genetics and remained for the rest of his career, except for one year when he was invited to teach in Europe. He taught an undergraduate course in genetics at Caltech and wrote a textbook with George Beadle. He became the leader of a new genetics research group at Caltech, whose members included George W. Beadle, Theodosius Dobzhansky, Sterling Emerson, and Jack Schultz. He was elected to the United States National Academy of Sciences in 1930 and the American Philosophical Society in 1936. He was elected a Fellow of the American Academy of Arts and Sciences in 1949. Sturtevant was awarded the John J. Carty Award from the National Academy of Sciences in 1965 . On February 13, 1968, he received the 1967 National Medal of Science "For a long and distinguished career in genetics during which he discovered and interpreted a number of important genetic phenomena in Drosophila and other organisms."

Sturtevant was interested in taxonomy as well as genetics. He loved solving all kinds of puzzles and saw genetics as a puzzle for him to decipher. He was widely read, interested in politics, newspapers, scientific journals across many subjects and crossword puzzles. He had an impressive memory and composed and edited papers in his head before writing them down from memory. He enjoyed a long and prosperous career in genetics until his death on April 5, 1970. He died in Pasadena, California at the age of 78.

== Historical context ==
Sturtevant accomplished most of his work between 1910 and World War II. These years saw both World War I and the Great Depression. Prior to World War II, universities and research programs operated under private donations; the federal government was not very involved in the funding of scientific research. Much research prior to World War II concerned the chemical nature of heredity. World War II changed the course of science. Focus was shifted away from biology and genetics to nuclear chemistry and physics. During and after World War II, the government became the key financial backer of scientific research, in the hopes that funding basic research would lead to technological advances. In this same time frame, Sturtevant was an outspoken opponent of eugenics and was interested in the effects of the atomic bomb on human populations, due to his previous research on lethal genes. He warned the public of possible harmful genetic effects of nuclear fallout despite supposedly low levels of ionizing radiation.

== Genetic research prior to Sturtevant ==
In 1865, Gregor Mendel published a paper entitled "Experiments in Plant Hybridization," in which he proposed the principles of heredity. This paper introduced the concept of dominant and recessive genes to explain how a characteristic can be repressed in one generation but appear in the next generation. Mendel also assumed that all hereditary factors worked independently of one another, which he explained in his law of independent assortment. Mendel's paper did not achieve much acclaim and was largely forgotten until 1900.

1865 to 1900 saw a time of theory formulation in the field of heredity/genetics. In 1883, Wilhelm Roux argued that the linear structure of chromosomes has an impact of making sure daughter cells get equal amounts of chromosomal material. This was the beginning of the chromosome theory; Roux viewed his findings as argument that chromosomes contain units of heredity. During this time frame, Hugo de Vries put forth a theory that persistent hereditary units are passed through generations and that each "unit" deals with a specific characteristic and the units can combine in different ways in the offspring.

From 1900 to 1909, anomalous data began to accumulate. Gene linkage was first reported by Carl Correns in 1900, contradicting Mendel's law of independent assortment. Thomas Hunt Morgan was the first to provide a working hypothesis for these exceptions. He postulated that genes that remained together while being passed from generation to generation must be located on the same chromosome.

== Sturtevant's work and its importance ==
Sturtevant's most notable discoveries include the principle of genetic mapping, chromosomal inversion, the first observation of a single gene mutation affecting behavior, the first reparable gene defect, the principle underlying fate mapping, the phenomena of unequal crossing-over, and position effect. His main contributions to science include his analysis of genetic "linkage groups," which became a classical method of chromosome mapping that we still use today. In 1913, he determined that genes were arranged on chromosomes in a linear fashion, like beads on a necklace. He also showed that the gene for any specific trait was in a fixed location (locus).

In his work between 1915 and 1928, Sturtevant determined that genes of Drosophila are arranged in linear order. In 1920, he published a set of three papers under the title "Genetic Studies on Drosophila simulans," which "proved that two closely related species had newly recurring mutations that were allelic and thus probably identical". His work also helped to determine the chromosomal basis of sex determination and development and described the importance of chromosomal crossing-over or recombination in genetic linkage of traits.

One of Sturtevant's principal contributions was his introduction of the concept that the frequency of crossing-over between two genes could help determine their proximity on a linear genetic map. His experiments determined that the frequency of double crossing over can be used to deduce gene order. He demonstrated this concept by constructing crosses of three segregating genes, called "three-factor crosses". He found that using three genes as opposed to two provided most accurate information about gene order on chromosome. With this system, Sturtevant discovered that double crossing-over occurs at frequency of equal to or less than the product of two single crossing over frequencies. He also demonstrated the possibility of "unequal crossing-over" and speculated that it was possibly a main force of evolution.

Sturtevant's work on the Drosophila genome enabled geneticists to further map chromosomes of higher organisms, including human beings. His former Caltech research partner George Beadle claimed that modern biochemical genetics stems directly from Sturtevant's work.

== Key publications ==
See Scholia for some of his publications.

- Sturtevant, A. H. (1913). "The linear arrangement of six sex-linked factors in Drosophila, as shown by their mode of association" (PDF). Journal of Experimental Zoology. 14 (1): 43–59. Bibcode:1913JEZ....14...43S. doi:10.1002/jez.1400140104. S2CID 82583173.
- Sturtevant, A. H. (1921). The North American species of Drosophila. Carnegie institution of Washington. Publicationno. 301. The Carnegie institution of Washington.
- Sturtevant, Alfred Henry; Beadle, G. W. (1939). An introduction to genetics. Philadelphia, London: W.B. Saunders company. Reprinted 1962, 1988.
- Sturtevant, Alfred H. (1965). A History of Genetics. New York: Harper & Row., Reprinted, 2001.
- Sturtevant, A. H. (1961). Lewis, E. B. (ed.). Genetics and evolution, selected papers of A. H. Sturtevant. San Francisco: W. H. Freeman.

== Students ==
- Edward B. Lewis
- Alfred G. Knudson
