= Proto-Indo-European ye-presents =

Proto-Indo-European verbal formation

The Proto-Indo-European ye-suffix could form primary verbs usually, though not exclusively, with an intransitive meaning. It could also form secondary denominatives.

== éy-presents ==
This suffix has been reconstructed as the source of verbs such as *tḱéyti ("to settle"), itself from the root *teḱ- ("to sire, beget"). It is also possible that this suffix served as the source for certain apparent *ey-extensions, such as the root *dʰgʷʰey- ("to decline, perish"), which is probably an extended form of *dʰegʷʰ-. The linguist Frederik Kortlandt argues this type was the progenitor of certain Balto-Slavic i-conjugation verbs, suggesting that—in particular—it is preserved by Old Prussian terms such as turrei ~ turri. According to the philologist Robert Beekes, this type underwent thematicization in all daughter branches except for Balto-Slavic and Italic. For instance, Beekes reconstructs PIE *mn̥-éy-ti as an example of this suffix, adducing Old Church Slavonic mĭněti and the thematicized Sanskrit verb mányate ("to think") as descendants. However, the LIV prefers to derive the Slavic forms from an essive present *mn̥-h₁-yé-ti and the Indo-Iranian term from a ye-present *mn̥-yé-. In any case, Kortlandt notes the existence of other Balto-Slavic ē-verbs with i-presents beside ye-presents in the other Indo-European languages, citing Lithuanian budėti ("to be awake") and judė́ti ("to move") besides Sanskrit búdhyate ("to wake") and yúdhyate ("to fight"). Linguists such as Peter Schrijver and Michiel de Vaan also derive the Latin third conjugation iō-verbs from the PIE athematic i-present, though, alternatively, other Indo-Europeanists such as Michael Weiss derive this verbal class from the thematic suffix *-yeti, with a series of intermediary phonological developments precipitating in its separation from the fourth conjugation. Regardless, Schrijver proposes a possible link between i-presents and eh₁-statives, citing examples such as Latin capiō (perhaps from *kap-i-) beside Old High German habēn (< *kap-eh₁yé-ti). Furthermore, in Balto-Slavic, i-present verbs coexist with ē-preterites, such as the Old Church Slavonic verb mĭnjǫ, whose aorist is mĭněxŭ.

== Primary ye-verbs ==
Indo-Iranian evidence attests to an association between the zero-grade ye-suffix and intransitivity. Class IV presents in Sanskrit, which are formed with the suffix -yati, are largely unified by intransitive semantics, regardless of whether or not the verb is deponent. Moreover, in Sanskrit, the suffix also evolved into the passivizing morpheme -yáte, which—though likely an Indo-Iranian innovation—nevertheless implies that the original PIE form of the suffix predisposed the later acquisition of a valency-reducing function. Verbs of this type were also often deponent (occurring only in middle voice). For instance, verbs such as *mr̥yétor (“to die”), *ǵn̥h₁yétor (“to be born”), and *mn̥yétor (“to think”) are all reconstructible at the Proto-Indo-European level. However, transitive ya-presents are not entirely absent from Vedic, and the other Indo-European languages also provide evidence of transitive verbs marked by this suffix, such as Ancient Greek τύπτω ("túptō," "to beat"). Thus, the original PIE form of the suffix was probably not exclusively associated with intransitivity. The formation with a full-grade root primarily appears in roots of the structure *TeT-, where a zero-grade sequence *TT- would be avoided due to phonological difficulties. Sihler argues that this verbal type was probably a later development, citing the oscillation between different ablaut grades in Ancient Greek terms such as ἔρδω ("érdō," "to act, do") and ῥέζω ("rhézō," "to do, make"), both of which ultimately derive from *wr̥ǵyéti. Semantically, this type is often associated with transitive verbs, such as *spéḱyeti ("to see").

== Denominatives ==
Ringe provides a pre-form of the shape *y-éti ~ *y-ónti, in which case the accent would be placed upon the suffix. Other Indo-Europeanists, however, do not specify the accent—Sihler, Kloekhorst, and Melchert all reconstruct *-y-eti ~ *y-onti. This suffix was attached to noun and adjective stems and could express a variety of meanings. The thematic vowel of the nominal stem, if any, is retained as e, as is any possible -eh₂ suffix, thus creating the variants -eyé- and -eh₂yé-, which developed into independent suffixes in many daughter languages.

== Factitives ==
Very similar to the denominative but formed from adjectives only. The thematic vowel is retained, but this time as o. The existence of this type in PIE is uncertain. The linguist Peter Schrijver suggests that evidence from "across Indo-European" attests to a morphological process whereby athematic verbs could be thematicized with the *-ye- suffix, which would also assign a factitive sense to the new verb, roughly meaning "to bring about the one is the object of X." For instance, Schrijver cites the verb amiciō ("to clothe, cover, dress"), which derives from the verb iaciō ("to throw"), itself—according to Schrijver—from an athematic i-present. Schrijver proposes that, the base meaning, due to the combination of the *-ye- extension and the prefix ambi- ("around-") was altered to "brings about that one is thrown around," whence "to cover oneself with clothing," ultimately yielding the meaning "to dress." For another possible example of this development in Latin, Schrijver cites reperiō ("to discover"), which he derives from pariō ("to beget, give birth"), with a sense development of "to cause something to be produced to me," whence "to discover." Regarding the Celtic evidence, Schrijver cites léicid ("to let go"), which he derives from a *-ye- extension to the nasal-present *linékʷti ("to be leaving"), whence also Latin linquō ("to leave, abandon"). According to Schrijver, this Celtic verb followed a semantic development of "to leave," whence "to bring about that one is the object of leaving," hence "to let go," However, as noted by Schrijver, ye-presents in Indo-Iranian, Greek, and Germanic that correspond to Latin third conjugation iō-verbs do not display a similar change in valency. For instance, Ancient Greek κάπτω ("káptō," "to gulp down") and Gothic hafjan ("to lift") beside Latin capiō ("to take, capture"), and also Ancient Greek σκέπτομαι ("sképtomai," "to look at, examine") beside Latin speciō ("to observe, look at").

== See also ==
- Proto-Indo-European language
- Proto-Indo-European verbs
