= Albrecht Goetze =

German-American Hittitologist (1897–1971)

Albrecht Ernst Rudolf Goetze (January 11, 1897 – August 15, 1971) was a German-American Hittitologist.

== Life and career ==
Goetze was born in Leipzig, Germany in 1897. His father, Rudolf Goetze, was a psychiatrist. He began studies in Munich in 1915, but left to fight in World War I. Returning in 1918, he received his degree from the University of Heidelberg in 1922 and taught there for five years.

Goetze was Professor of Semitic languages at the University of Marburg when the Nazi regime came to power in 1933. It was through the initiative of Edgar H. Sturtevant that Goetze was invited to Yale University in 1934, a move that was to prove momentous for the advancement of Assyrology and Hittitology at Yale. He was made Sterling Professor of Assyriology and Babylonian Literature in 1956 and retired to emeritus status in 1965.

Goetze's combined training in Indo-European and Semitic linguistics placed him into an advantageous position to tackle the emerging field of Hittite studies at the end of World War I.

With Sturtevant, he laid the foundations to what later became the Goetze-Wittmann law (spirantization of palatal stops before u as the focal origin for the diffusion of the Centum-Satem isogloss). The diffusion hypothesis of the Satem features has the merit to motivate the existence of marginal Satem features in Greek, Albanian and Tocharian and of marginal Centum features in Armenian.

Goetze was elected to the American Philosophical Society in 1951.

Goetze died in Garmisch, Bavaria on August 15, 1971.

== Bibliography ==
- Finkelstein, Jacob J. (1972). "Albrecht Goetze, 1897–1971." Journal of the American Oriental Society 92:2.197–203.
- Goetze, Albrecht (1954). Review of: Johannes Friedrich, Hethitisches Wörterbuch (Heidelberg: Winter). Language 30. 401–405.
- Goetze, Albrecht (1957). Kleinasien. Munich (first edition 1933)
- Goetze, Albrecht (1974). "Bibliography of Albrecht Goetze (1897–1971)." Journal of Cuneiform Studies 26.2-15.
- Goetze, Albrecht & Edgar H. Sturtevant (1938). The Hittite Ritual of Tunnawi. New Haven: American Oriental Society.
- Wittmann, Henri (1969). "The development of K in Hittite". Glossa. 3: 22–26.

== See also ==
- Hittite language
