= Julian Monson Sturtevant =

American author and educator (1805–1886)

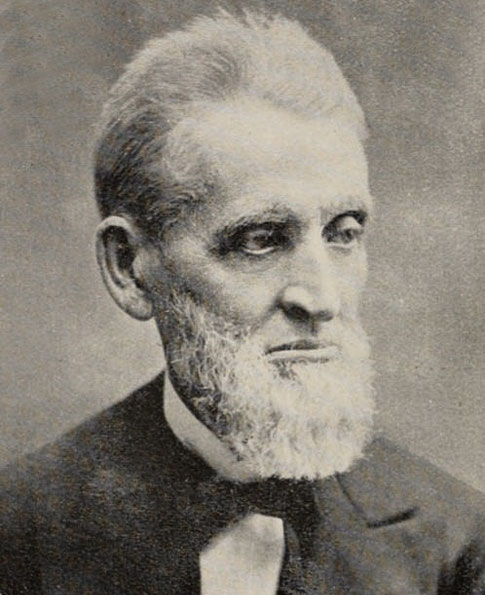
- Born: July 26, 1805; Warren, Connecticut, U.S.
- Died: February 11, 1886 (aged 80); Jacksonville, Illinois
- Education: Yale College; Yale Theological Seminary; University of Missouri; Iowa College
- Scientific career
- Fields: Theology, political science, law
- Workplaces: Illinois College

Julian Monson Sturtevant (July 26, 1805 – February 11, 1886) was an American writer and educator. He was a founding professor and second president of Illinois College.

Sturtevant, son of Warren and Lucy (Tanner) Sturtevant, was born in Warren, Connecticut on July 26, 1805. In 1816, the family removed to the Western Reserve, and settled in Tallmadge (then Portage), Ohio, whence two sons came to Yale College in 1822. Julian, the younger son, graduated in 1826. After teaching school in New Canaan, Connecticut, he entered the Yale Theological Seminary in 1828, and was ordained at Woodbury, Connecticut on August 27, 1829, as an evangelist. Four days later, he married Elizabeth M. Fayerweather of New Canaan.

In the ensuing fall, as one of the "Illinois Band" which he had helped to form in the Seminary, he settled in the infant town of Jacksonville, Illinois, and there in January 1830, he became the first teacher in what is now Illinois College. In 1831, he was elected Professor of Mathematics and Natural Philosophy in the institution which he had organized, and he continued to be thus engaged until November 1844, when he was advanced to the Presidency of Illinois College. He resigned the latter office in May 1876, but continued to teach for nine years longer in the department of mental and political science.

Until after his retirement from the Presidency, his engagements were too burdensome to allow of extended authorship, but in 1877 he published Economics, or the Science of Wealth, and in 1880 The Keys of Sect; or the Church of the New Testament. The degree of Doctor of Divinity was conferred on him by the University of Missouri in 1848, and that of Doctor of Laws by Iowa College in 1871.

His wife died in 1840, and the next year he married her sister, Hannah Fayerweather, who died January 17, 1886. Her death was a severe shock to him, and his own death followed one month later at Jacksonville, on February 11, in the 81st year of his age. He had ten children, five by each marriage. The eldest son, Julian, an Illinois College graduate, was a clergyman, bearing his father's name. Sturtevant was the grandfather of geneticist Alfred Sturtevant, linguist Edgar Howard Sturtevant, and great-grandfather of biochemist Julian Sturtevant.

This article incorporates public domain material from the 1886 Yale Obituary Record.
