= Kenneth Breslauer =

American chemist and biologist

- Born: 1947 (age 78–79); Jönköping, Sweden
- Education: University of Wisconsin (B.A.), Yale University (Ph.D.)
- Spouse: Sherrie Schwab
- Children: 2 sons
- Awards: Wolfgang Prize for outstanding teaching at Yale, 1970
- Scientific career
- Fields: Communication between biological molecules
- Workplaces: Rutgers University
- Thesis: (1972)
- Doctoral advisor: Julian M. Sturtevant

Kenneth Breslauer (born 1947) is the Linus C. Pauling Distinguished University Professor of Chemistry and Chemical Biology at Rutgers University. He is the Founding Dean of the Division of Life Sciences and served as vice president for Health Science Partnerships. Breslauer's research focuses on defining and characterizing the molecular forces that control communication between biological molecules, particularly those interactions that modulate and control gene expression, DNA damage repair, mutagenesis, and drug binding. Breslauer arrived at the university as an assistant professor in 1974.

== Research ==
Breslauer determined a DNA database that allows one to energetically map genome sequence information so as to correlate regions of differential stabilities with regions of differential biological functions. The database and its extensions also have been used to design probes and drugs with predictable hybridization and binding properties, a capability key to various diagnostic and therapeutic protocols. Breslauer has mapped the energetic consequences of DNA damage, knowledge critical to understanding the mechanisms of DNA repair, including why certain mutations escape repair and result in cancer. Most recently, Breslauer has elucidated the significance of metastable states within the rough energy landscapes of DNA molecules, information critical to our understanding of the molecular origins of triple repeat diseases, such as Huntington's disease and fragile X syndrome.
Breslauer is the Executive Editor of Biopolymers, a major journal in his field, and is founding editor of Nucleic Acid Sciences. He also serves on numerous scientific advisory boards, including those associated with the Cancer Institute of New Jersey, the Center for Advanced Biotechnology and Medicine, as well as federal funding agency study sections.

== Deanship ==
As a Dean, Breslauer reorganized the life sciences into an administratively and programmatically integrated structure, the Division of Life Sciences (DLS). This entity encompasses three departments (Cell Biology and Neuroscience, Genetics, Molecular Biology and Biochemistry); two sections (Biological Chemistry, Behavioral Neuropsychology); multiple centers and institutes (the Biomaterials Center, the Human Genetics Institute, the Rutgers University Cell and DNA Repository, the W. M. Keck Center Collaborative Neurosciences, the Spinal Cord Injury Project, the Rutgers Stem Cell Research Center, the Research Collaboratory for Structural Bioinformatics, etc.) and partnerships with existing life sciences centers, institutes, and schools. And a broad range of Core Facilities (confocal microscopy, high-field NMR, Mass Spectrometry, Calorimetry and Spectroscopy, Imaging, etc.). The Division of Life sciences also comprises the Office of Undergraduate Instruction (OUGI), which includes the Office of Diversity and Academic Success in the Sciences (ODASIS), the Health Professions Office (HPO); as well as the Graduate Office in Molecular Biosciences.
Administratively, under the direction of a Business Office, the DLS provides centralized grants management, procurement, personnel management, facilities maintenance and oversight, and IT support. Programmatically, an overarching theme of the DLS is the focus on translational research in which knowledge from the laboratory bench is rapidly translated into treatments at the bedside of the patient W.M. Keck Center for spinal cord injury, the New Jersey Center for biomaterials, the New Jersey Stem Cell institute and the Waksman Institute of Microbiology.
Since 2005, the Divisional office is partly housed in the new Life Sciences building on the Busch campus; a facility that represents the culmination of nearly a decade long campaign by Breslauer to build space for life science development. Currently, the building houses the New Jersey Center for Biomaterials, the Human Genetics Institute, and the Rutgers Department of Genetics.

As Vice President for health science partnerships, Breslauer has assumed a leadership role in establishing with the University of Medicine and Dentistry of New Jersey the Stem Cell Institute of New Jersey, the Center for Clinical Translational Sciences, Shared Major Instrumentation Research Facilities, as well as partnerships with universities in China, Taiwan, Africa, and elsewhere, including mutually beneficial cooperative agreements with the private sector.

== Personal background ==
Kenneth Breslauer was born in Jönköping, Sweden and raised in the Jackson Heights section of Queens in New York City. His parents were natives of Germany but fled the country during Hitler's era. His father's father, George Breslauer, was a supreme court justice in Germany before Hitler came to power. His mother's father, Hans Schäffer, was an undersecretary of the treasury for the Weimar Republic from 1928 to 1932, whose diaries were donated to the Leo Baeck Institute in Manhattan. His older brother is former UC Berkeley Executive Vice Chancellor and Provost George W. Breslauer.

Kenneth Breslauer is married to Sherrie Schwab, a private-practice psychotherapist, and they have two sons (Daniel and Jordan). Both of them, like their parents, are big sports fans.

== Education and professional career ==
Although he started college as a history major, Breslauer graduated in 1968 with honors from the University of Wisconsin, with both a bachelor's degree in chemistry as well as a B.A. degree. During high school and his freshman year in college, Breslauer played left field on his schools’ baseball teams, and, subsequently, for a brief period, he followed his passion and played minor league baseball in West Haven, Connecticut. Breslauer was a baseball standout at McBurney High School in New York City (Class of 1964). During his PhD research at Yale University, Breslauer developed a new calorimetric method for investigating the molecular forces that control the stability and folding of proteins, His results were incorporated in databases for characterizing hydrophobic and hydrophilic forces associated with protein stability. He graduated from Yale in 1972. As a postdoc at the University of California at Berkeley, Breslauer investigated and characterized the molecular forces associated with dictating and controlling nucleic acid stability. At Rutgers since 1974, he combines these fields by investigating protein-DNA, and drug-DNA interactions, particularly as they relate to regulation of gene expression, DNA damage repair, and molecular diseases. Breslauer is author of over 200 publications. His most cited paper describes a model and presents a database that has been used throughout the field to predict DNA duplex stability from the base sequence, and it is cited over 1000 times. This paper and subsequent work from his laboratory have led to a patent being issued to Breslauer and co-workers (No. 6,815,163) entitled “Methods and Kits for Screening Nucleic Acid Duplex Stability.”

== Awards ==
- 1970: Wolfgang Prize for outstanding teaching at Yale
- 1981: Humboldt Fellowship Award for research in Germany
- 1985: Sunner Medal, as the nation's outstanding, “young” biothermodynamicist
- 1987: Johnson & Johnson Research Discovery Award
- 1995: Huffman Memorial Award
- 1996: Elected Fellow of the AAAS
