= Roosevelt House =

Roosevelt House may refer to:

- Roosevelt House, a former high-rise apartment building for senior citizens, in Atlanta, Georgia; see Demolished public housing projects in Atlanta#Roosevelt House
- Roosevelt House Public Policy Institute at Hunter College
- Isaac Roosevelt House, Hyde Park, New York, listed on the U.S. National Register of Historic Places
- Sara Delano Roosevelt Memorial House, New York, New York, NRHP-listed
- Home of Franklin D. Roosevelt National Historic Site
- Theodore Roosevelt Birthplace National Historic Site, Manhattan, New York
- Theodore Roosevelt Inaugural National Historic Site, Buffalo, New York
- Sagamore Hill, Oyster Bay, New York
