= Ochre Point–Cliffs Historic District =

Historic district in Rhode Island, United States

- U.S. National Register of Historic Places
- U.S. Historic district
- U.S. National Historic Landmark District – Contributing property
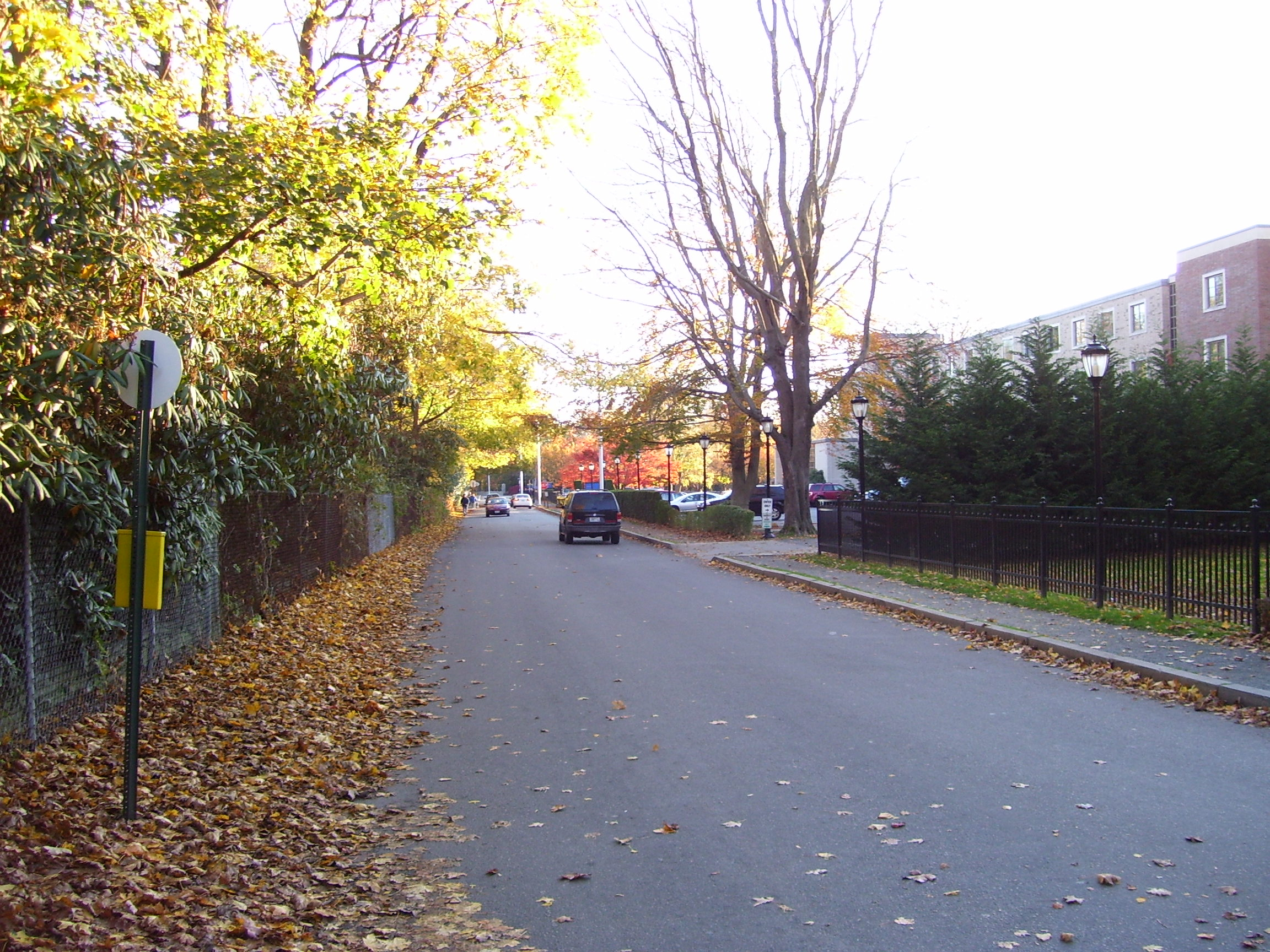
- Ochre Point Avenue

- Location within Rhode Island Location within the United States
- Location: Newport, Rhode Island
- Coordinates: 41°28′29″N 71°17′54″W
- Area: 230 acres (93 ha)
- Built: 1850
- Architectural style: Late Gothic Revival, Queen Anne, Chateauesque, other
- Part of: Bellevue Avenue Historic District (ID72000023)
- NRHP reference No.: 75000211

Significant dates
- Added to NRHP: March 18, 1975
- Designated NHLDCP: December 8, 1972

The Ochre Point–Cliffs Historic District is a historic district in Newport, Rhode Island. The district includes a significant subset of the Bellevue Avenue Historic District, a National Historic Landmark District, including all of the major Gilded Age mansions on the waterfront facing Easton Bay between Memorial Boulevard and Marine Avenue. The district is home to famous mansions such as the William Watts Sherman House and The Breakers, one of the largest houses in the area built by the Vanderbilt Family. The district was added to the National Register of Historic Places in 1975.

It includes Bois Doré, a French chateau-style mansion built in 1927, designed by New York architect Charles A. Platt for William Fahnestock, a New York banker.

== See also ==
- National Register of Historic Places listings in Newport County, Rhode Island
