= Astor Court Building =

Apartment building in Manhattan, New York

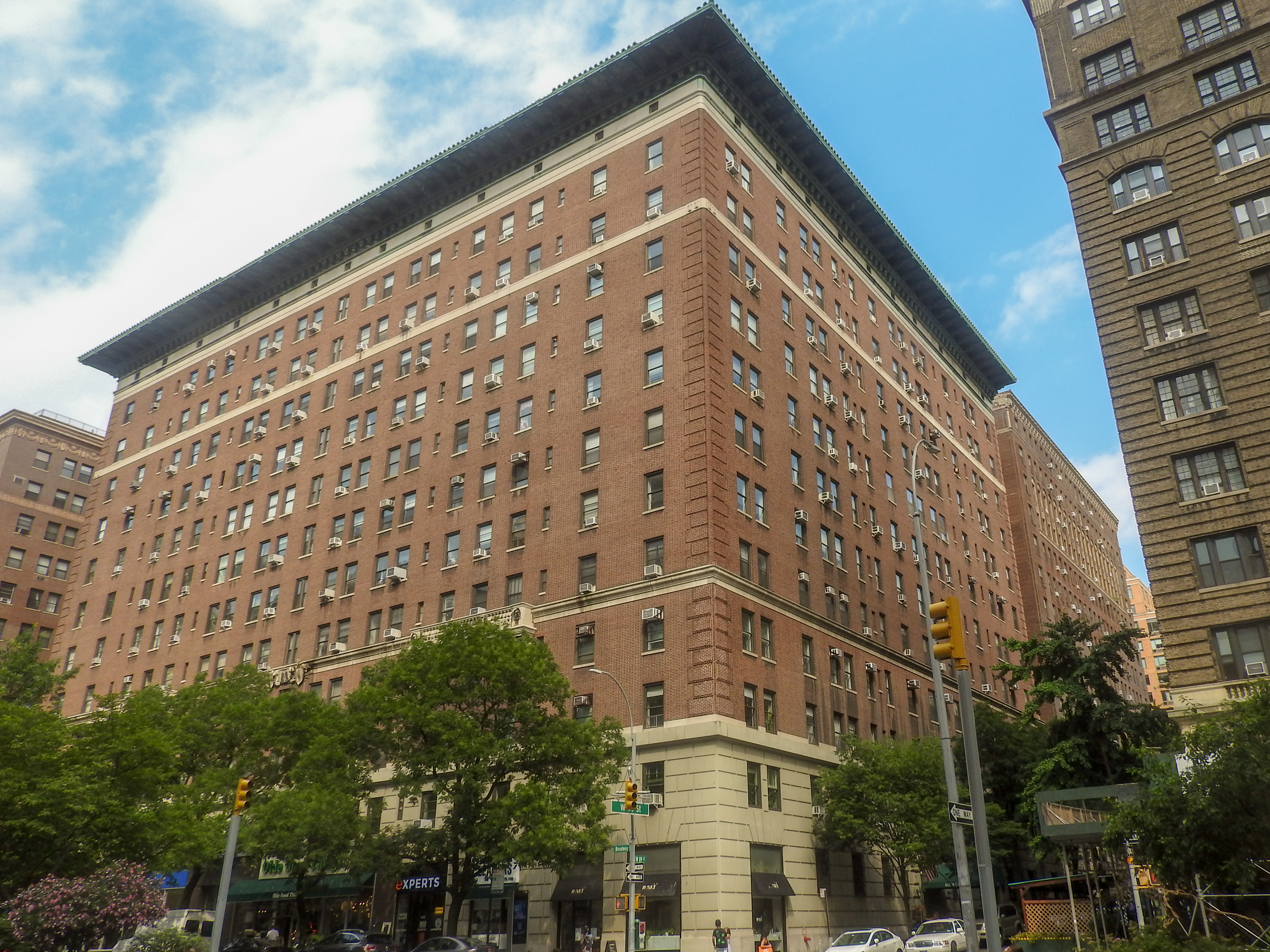
- View of the building
- Interactive map of the Astor Court Building area

General information
- Type: Cooperative
- Location: Between 89th Street and 90th Street, New York, NY, United States
- Coordinates: 40.7903°N 73.9745°W
- Construction started: 1916
- Completed: 1916

Technical details
- Floor count: 13

Design and construction
- Architects: Charles A. Platt (building); Ellen Biddle Shipman (landscape)

The Astor Court Building is a 12-story, 164 unit apartment building on Broadway between West 89th Street and 90th Street on the Upper West Side of Manhattan in New York City, United States. Built in 1916, it was designed by architect Charles A. Platt for developer Vincent Astor. The twelve-story building is constructed around a landscaped courtyard. Architectural historian Christopher Gray believes that the landscape architect may have been Ellen Biddle Shipman. The building became a co-op in 1985.

Famous residents include Joy Behar from The View.
