= Bois Doré (Newport, Rhode Island) =

French chateau style mansion in built in 1927 in Newport, Rhode Island

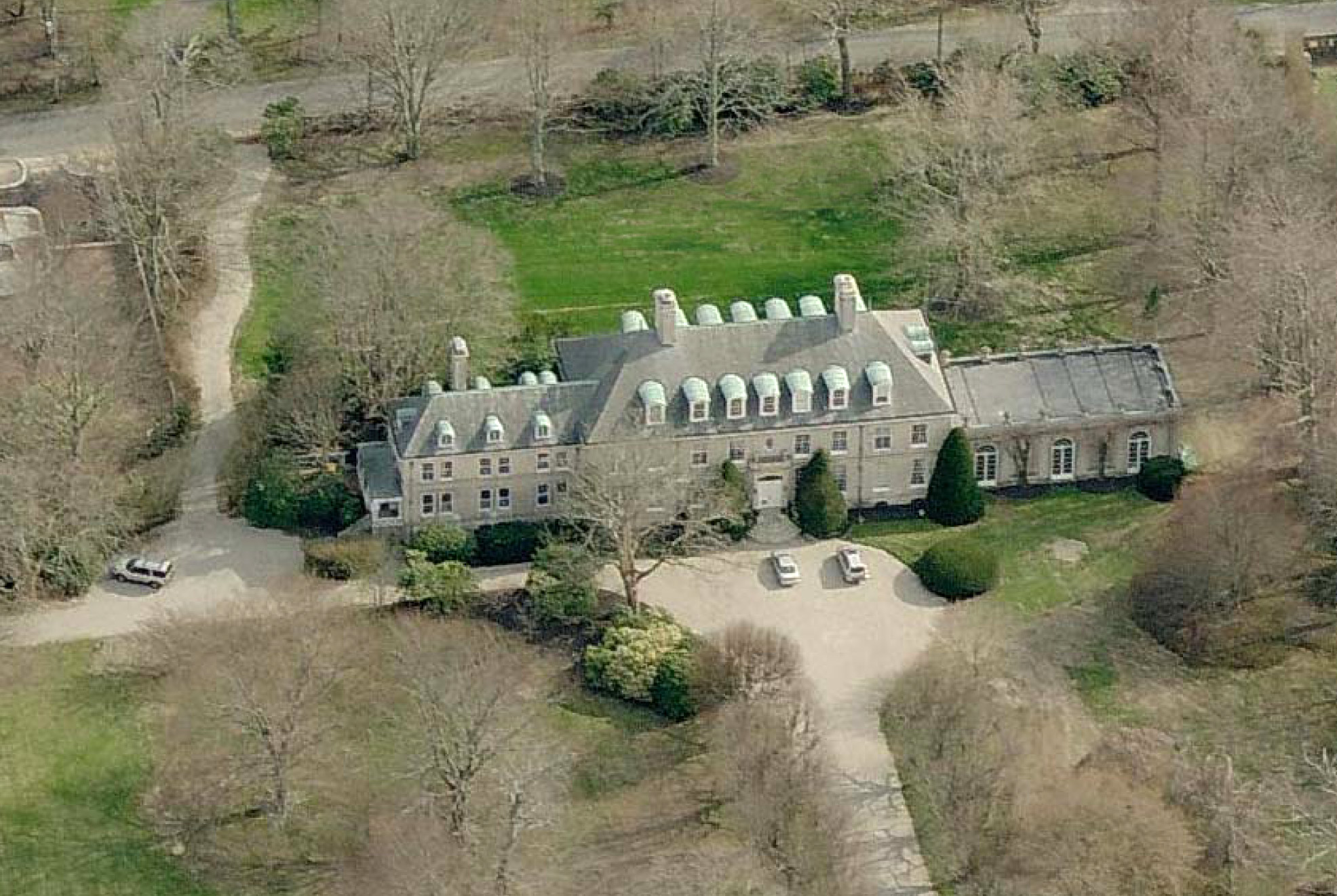
- Bois Doré
- Interactive map of the Bois Doré area

General information
- Architectural style: French chateau
- Location: 115 Narragansett Ave, Newport, Rhode Island, United States
- Coordinates: 41.4747437°N 71.3060601°W
- Completed: 1927

Technical details
- Material: Limestone
- Floor area: 19,000 square feet

Design and construction
- Architect: Charles A. Platt
- Bois Doré
- U.S. Historic district – Contributing property
- Part of: Ochre Point–Cliffs Historic District (ID75000211)
- Designated CP: March 18, 1975

Bois Doré is a French chateau-style mansion built in 1927 in Newport, Rhode Island. It was designed by New York architect Charles A. Platt for William Fahnestock, a New York banker. It is described as one of the last great houses built for Newport, and is a part of the Ochre Point-Cliffs Historic District.

== Description ==
The 19,000-square-foot mansion is built of limestone in the French chateau style, and includes 25 bedrooms, a loggia and terrace, a 2,000 square foot grand ballroom, and is situated on four acres of land.

== History ==
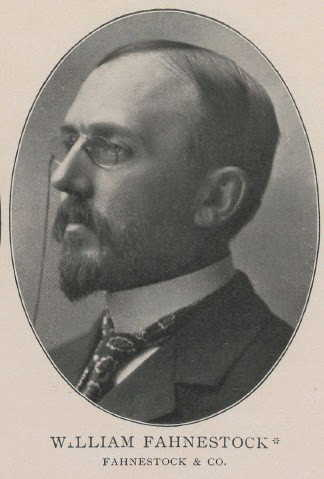
William Fahnestock

Bois Doré was built in 1927. It was designed by New York architect Charles A. Platt for William Fahnestock, who came from a prominent New York banking family which founded Oppenheimer Holdings.

It was later owned by Cambell's Soup heiress, Elinor Winifred Dorrance Hill Ingersoll who married Vice Admiral Stuart Ingersoll, USN.

Later, it was owned by oil heiress Carolyn Mary Skelly, daughter of William Grove Skelly. She was once dubbed the "most robbed woman in the US" by the Boston Globe. The estate is currently owned by Fairfax & Sammons Properties LLC.

The mansion was sold in 2021 for $8.99 million.

As of 2025, it remains privately owned and not open to the public.
