= 131 East 66th Street =

Building in Manhattan, New York

Coordinates: 40°45′59.64″N 73°57′52.37″W

Studio Building in New York

The Studio Building is located on 131 East 66th Street on the Upper East Side of Manhattan, New York City.

== History ==
This Italian Renaissance-inspired building was constructed in 1905–1906 as a cooperative apartment house. Designed by Charles A. Platt, who resided here from 1906 until his death in 1933, the building expresses the architect's highly individualistic style. Crowned by an elaborate projecting cornice, the limestone elevations are proportioned and feature a rhythmic grouping of windows. The two entrances are distinguished by massive columns and broken pediments.

A Designated Landmark plaque was fixed by the New York Landmarks Preservation Foundation in 2006.
