= Carolyn Mary Skelly =

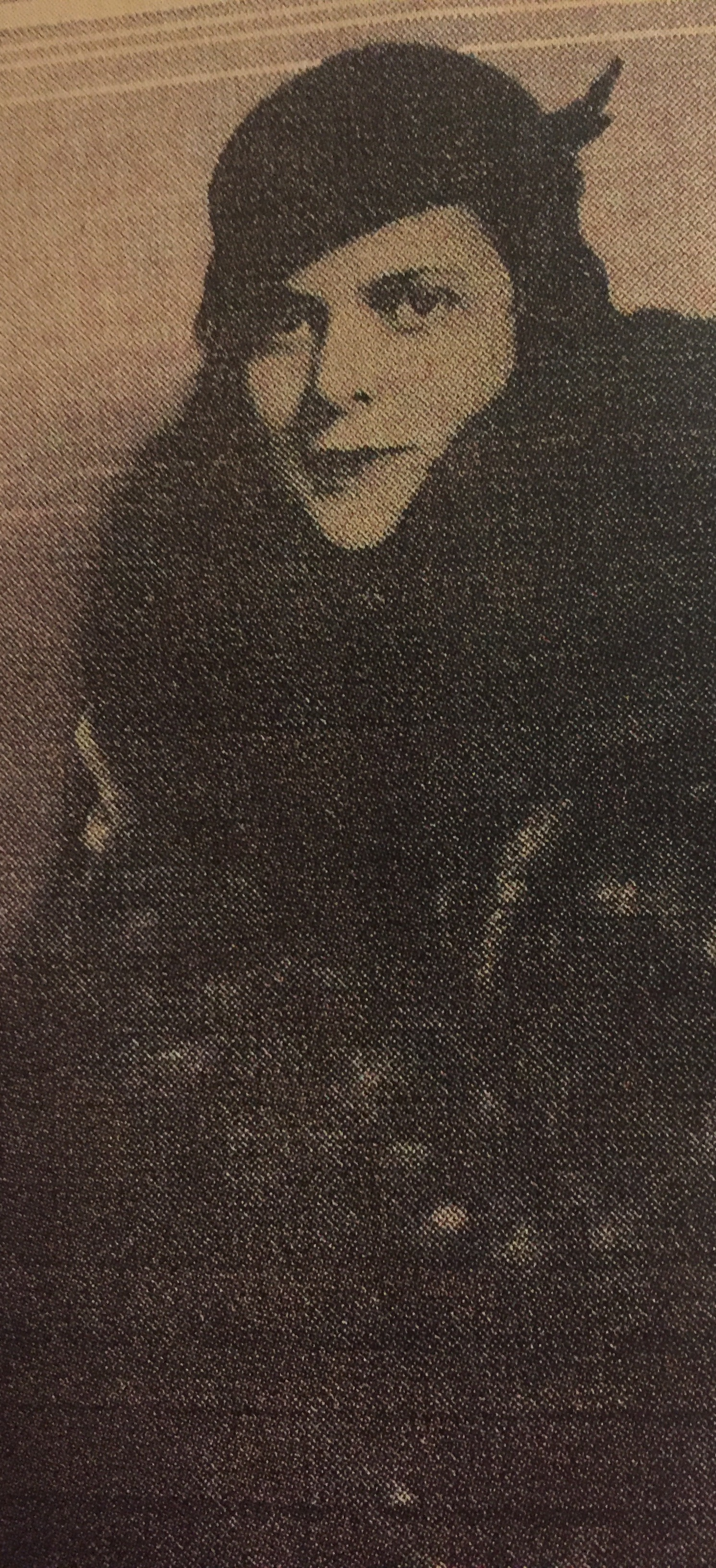
- Born: Carolyn Mary Skelly; December 2, 1905; Marion, Indiana, U.S.
- Died: December 10, 1996 (aged 91); Newport, Rhode Island, U.S.
- Occupation: Heiress
- Spouse: Freeman W. Burford (m. 1926; div. 1940)
- Children: William Skelly Burford; Carolyn Burford; Ann Burford
- Parent(s): William Grove Skelly; Gertrude Elizabeth Frank
- Family: Joanne Jane Skelly-Stuart (sister)

Carolyn Mary Skelly (December 2, 1905 – December 10, 1996) was an American oil heiress and socialite. She was well known for her extravagant parties but was herself mysteriously disfigured. As the owner of Bois Doré, she continued clubbing well into her 80s and became “America’s No. 1 Jewelry Robbery Victim”.

== Early life ==
Carolyn Mary Skelly was born in Marion, Indiana, to William Grove Skelly, founder of the Skelly Oil Company (which became part of Getty Oil) and Gertrude Elizabeth Frank. Carolyn's only sibling was a younger sister named Joanne.

The family moved to Tulsa, Oklahoma.

== Marriage ==
In Tulsa, she met and started dating Freeman W. Burford, a law student at Tulsa University. Freeman also moonlighted as a truck driver for Skelly Oil. Once married, the couple moved to Shreveport, Louisiana, where Freeman became the vice-president and general manager of Crystal Oil Refining Corp, a division of Skelly Oil. Later he started working independently in Dallas, Texas. The family moved to Dallas in 1929, where Freeman became the organizer and general manager of Burford Oil Company after he opened the East Texas Refining Company in Pecos, Texas, which operated from 1929 to 1939 before it was destroyed in an explosion.

They became part of the Dallas elite. When their close friend, Sheppard King, was in financial trouble in 1933, they traded him their home and $76,000 in cash for the Rosewood mansion.

During her lifetime she had jewelry stolen worth an estimated $20 million.
