= Charles A. Platt =

American landscape architect (1861–1933)

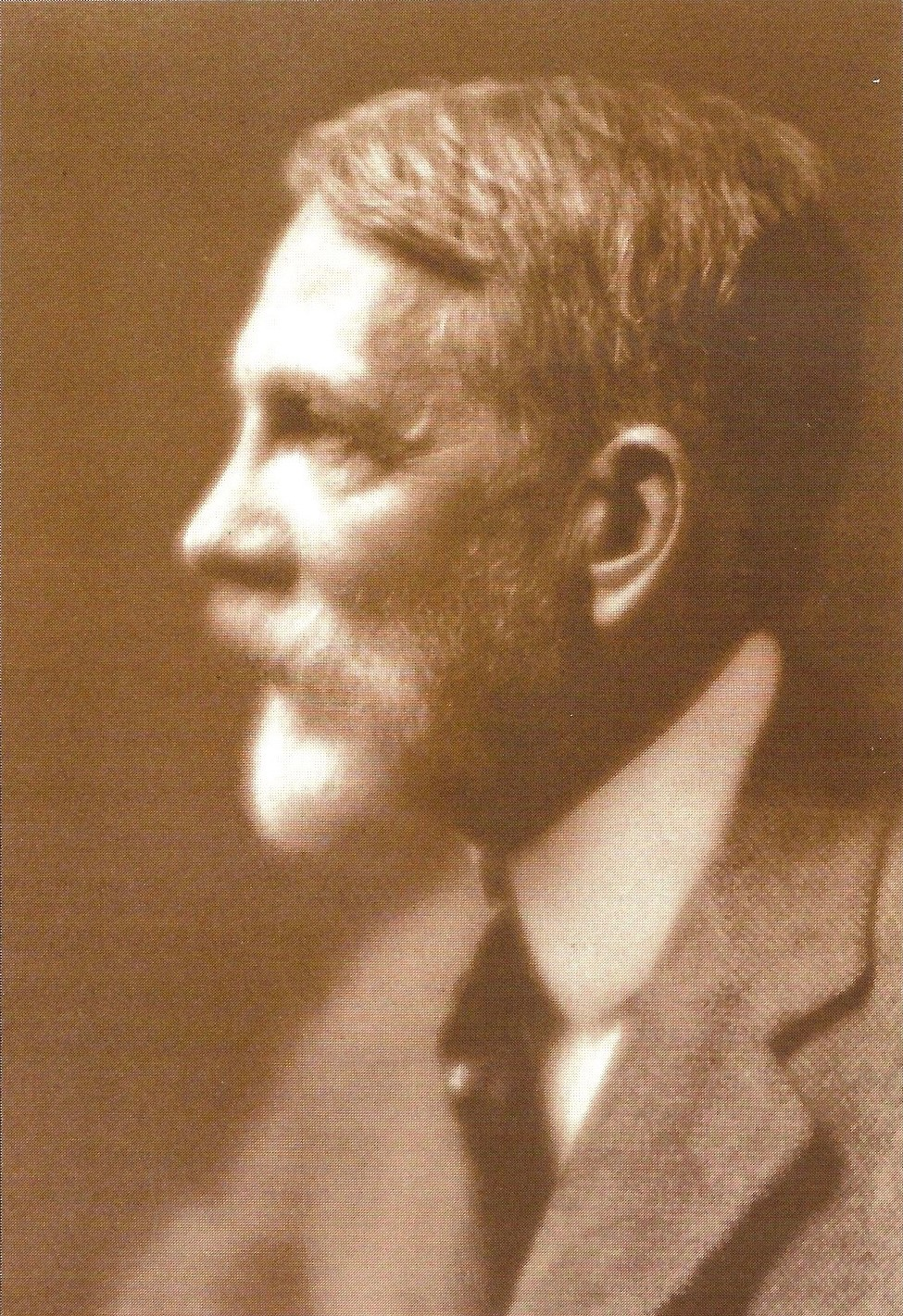
- Charles A. Platt in 1923
- Born: October 16, 1861; New York, New York, U.S.
- Died: September 12, 1933 (aged 71)
- Education: Académie Julian
- Occupation: Architect
- Buildings: Lyme Art Association; Lyman Allyn Art Museum; Astor Court Building; Studio Building (New York City); Endicott House; Bois Doré; Freer Gallery of Art; Addison Gallery of American Art; Harlakenden; Tregaron Estate

Charles Adams Platt (October 16, 1861 – September 12, 1933) was an American architect, garden designer, and artist of the "American Renaissance" movement. His garden designs complemented his domestic architecture.

== Early career ==
=== Painting and etching ===
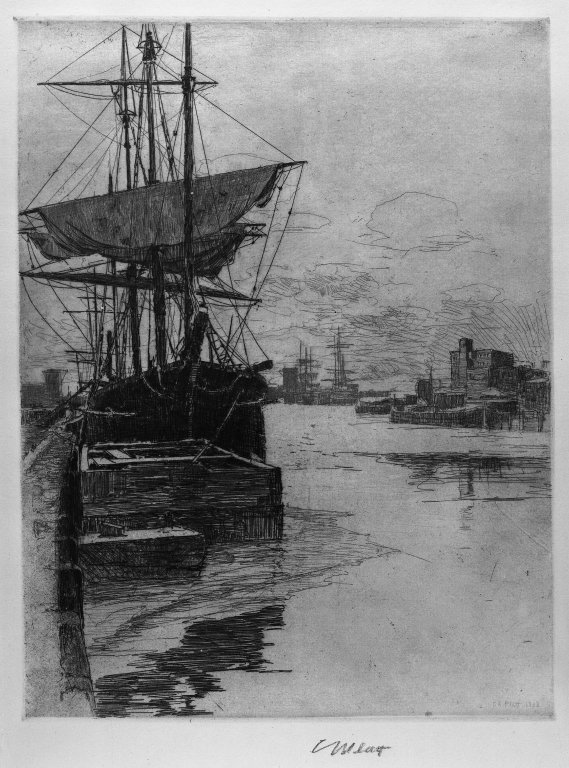
A marine etching from Platt's early period after he studied under Stephen Parrish

Platt was born in New York City, the son of Mary Elizabeth (Cheney) and John Henry Platt. Platt trained as a landscape painter, and as an etcher with Stephen Parrish in Gloucester, Massachusetts, in 1880. He attended the National Academy of Design and the Art Students League in New York, and later, the Académie Julian in Paris, with Gustave Boulanger and Jules Joseph Lefebvre. At the Paris Salon of 1885, he exhibited his paintings and etchings and gained his first audience. In the decade 1880–1890, he made hundreds of etchings of architecture and landscapes. He received a bronze medal at the Paris Exposition Universelle of 1900.

=== Gardens ===
A trip to Italy in 1892 in the company of his brother to photograph extant Renaissance gardens and villas led to a marked development in Platt's aesthetic approach. He published many of these images in his influential book Italian Gardens (Harper & Brothers, 1894), the outcome of two articles published in Harper's New Monthly Magazine in the summer of 1893. The volume was strong on the surviving gardens of the Renaissance and Baroque and made no attempt to describe their history or their designers. As well, the influences of Reginald Blomfield's The Formal Garden in England (1892) and gardens by Gertrude Jekyll illustrated in Country Life further refined Platt's style. (Platt was unaware of the first history of Italian gardens, W.P. Tuckermann's thorough Die Gartenkunst der italienischen Renaissance-Zeit, Berlin 1884.) The impact of Platt, and of Edith Wharton's Italian Villas and Their Gardens (1904), can be seen in the shift among stylish Americans from country houses set in lawns with shaped beds of annuals, swept drives and clumps of trees typical of 1885 to houses in settings of gravel-lined forecourts, planted terracing, formal stairs and water features, herbaceous borders and pergolas typical of the early 20th century.

Platt was a member of the group that gravitated to the Cornish Art Colony, which formed around Augustus Saint-Gaudens in Cornish, New Hampshire. His own garden in Cornish, made between 1892 and 1912, exemplifies a new style, essentially an Arts and Crafts setting for Beaux-Arts Neo-Georgian and Colonial Revival architecture.

=== Architecture and clients ===
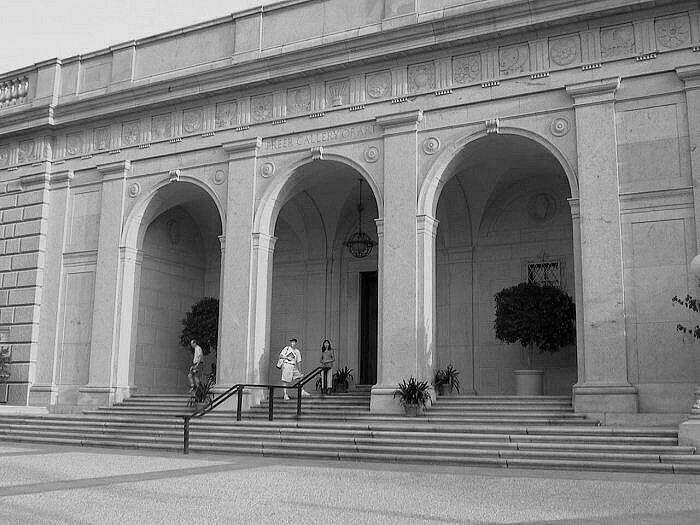
Platt's 1918 Freer Gallery of Art in Washington, DC

Platt designed a grand country estate for Edith Rockefeller McCormick at "Villa Turicum" in Lake Forest, Illinois (1912, demolished).

In 1907, he designed a townhouse for Sara Delano Roosevelt on East 65th Street in New York, now a historic landmark, the Sara Delano Roosevelt Memorial House. Eleanor Roosevelt called Platt "an architect of great taste" who with the townhouse had "made the most of every inch of space." The building currently houses the Roosevelt House Public Policy Institute at Hunter College.

In 1912, he designed "The Causeway", Washington, D.C., a Neo-Georgian house in an extensive wooded landscape setting. He also designed a house in 1912 in Roslyn, New York, for George R. Dyer.

Platt also designed a large manor house and grounds, built in 1915 in the City of Little Falls, New York (extant, in private ownership). The manor was owned by Mr. J. Judson Gilbert, proprietor of the Gilbert Knitting Company and several other then-prosperous factories in the Mohawk Valley region of Upstate New York.

The MIT Endicott House in Dedham, Massachusetts, is another Platt-designed mansion built for H. Wendell Endicott in 1934, in use today as a conference center for Massachusetts Institute of Technology.

In 1906, Platt had begun to receive numerous commissions from the estate of Vincent Astor. Platt turned to professional help in surveying large-scale projects from the sons of Frederick Law Olmsted. He also received detailed planting plans to fill his borders from Ellen Biddle Shipman, whom he had come to know through her gardening at Cornish, and whom he had instructed in presentation drawings by a draftsman from his own office, then sent to Grosse Pointe, Michigan to plant one of his designs.

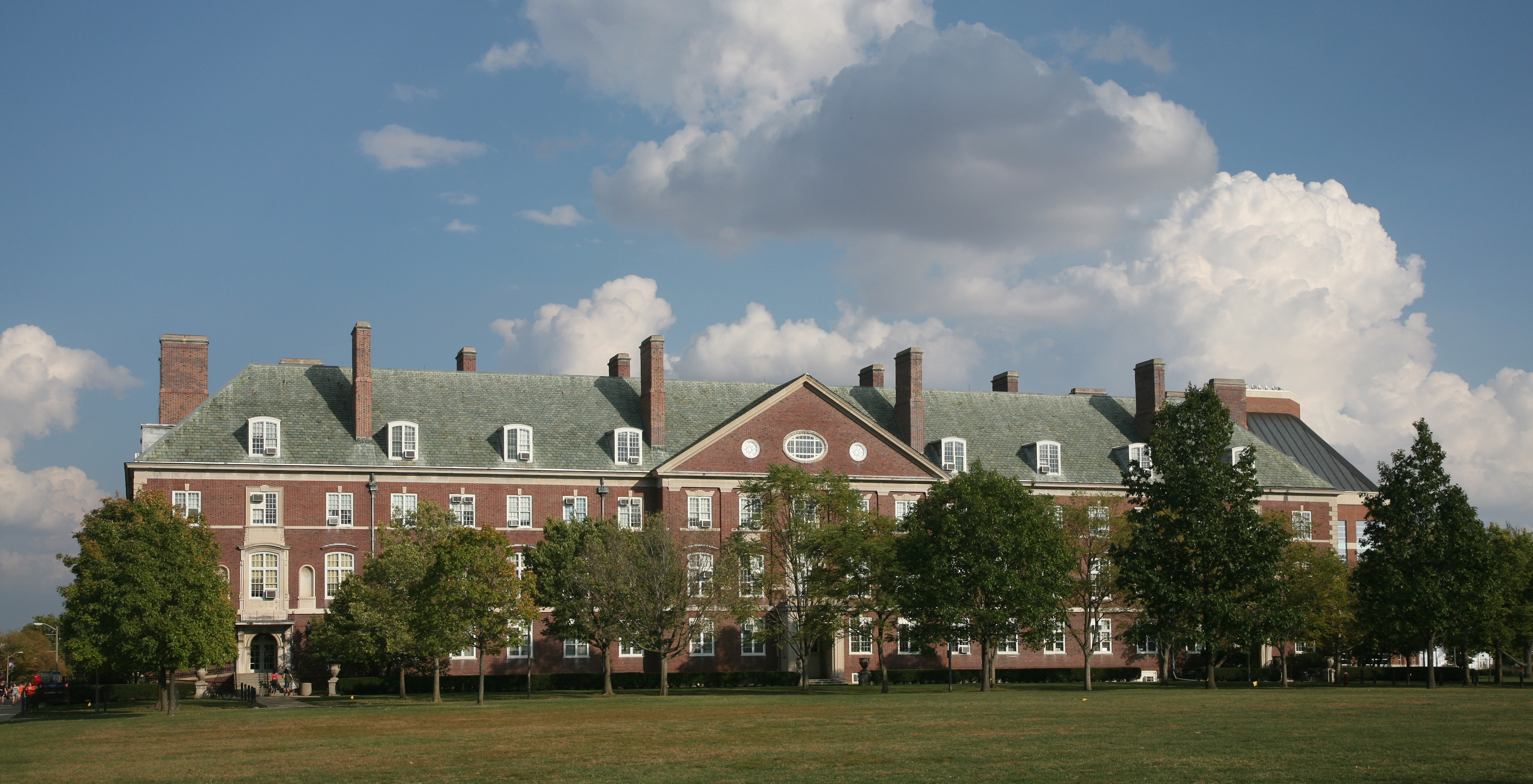
Mumford Hall at University of Illinois at Urbana-Champaign; one of the buildings Platt designed.

His more visible public commissions include the Italianate palazzo he designed for the Smithsonian Institution's Freer Gallery of Art (1918) in Washington, D.C., and the campuses of Connecticut College, Deerfield Academy, Phillips Academy Andover, where he designed the chapel and library and their settings, and the University of Illinois Urbana-Champaign (1922 and 1927). He fulfilled the University of Illinois's 1920s building program by designing 11 buildings, for many purposes, all in a Georgian style, with red brick, white wood and limestone trim, round and arched windows, and prominent gables, dormers, and chimneys. Some of the buildings he designed include, Mumford Hall, the Main Library, David Kinley Hall, and the President's House.

His Italian Renaissance-styled Russell A. Alger House, at 32 Lakeshore Drive, now serves as the Grosse Pointe War Memorial. Platt also designed the Lyme Art Association building in Old Lyme, Connecticut. Platt's The Leader-News Building in Cleveland, Ohio, at the corner of Superior and Bond Street (now East 6th Street) was reportedly fitted with elevator cabs designed by Tiffany Studios. The Building was completed in 1912 and, per the Architectural Record, "Cleveland is to be congratulated upon the possession of one of the handsomest and most distinguished buildings in the country." - H.D.C.

In 1919, Platt became a trustee of the American Academy in Rome. He became president of the academy in 1928 and served until his death. He also served on the U.S. Commission of Fine Arts from 1916 to 1921, and as vice chairman from 1920 to 1921.

Throughout his life, Platt maintained his house and garden in Cornish, New Hampshire, and an office and residence in Manhattan. With his second wife, Eleanor Hardy Bunker (widow of Dennis Miller Bunker), whom Platt married in 1893, Platt had five children. Among the children were William (1897–1984) and Geoffrey (1905–1985), who followed in their father's footsteps and practiced architecture in New York City. His great-grandsons include actor Oliver Platt and local politician William Palmer. Charles Platt died in Cornish, New Hampshire at the age of 72.

Near the end of the 20th century, some of Platt's surviving gardens in their full maturity were opened to the public including the spectacular gardens at the Gwinn Estate in Cleveland, Ohio (designed with Warren Manning and Ellen Biddle Shipman).

== Gallery of architectural works ==
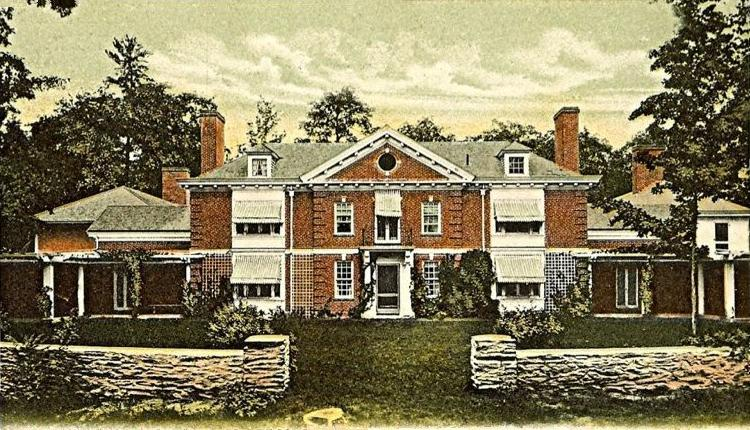
Harlakenden House, Cornish, New Hampshire (built in 1898; summer White House to Woodrow Wilson, burned in 1923).

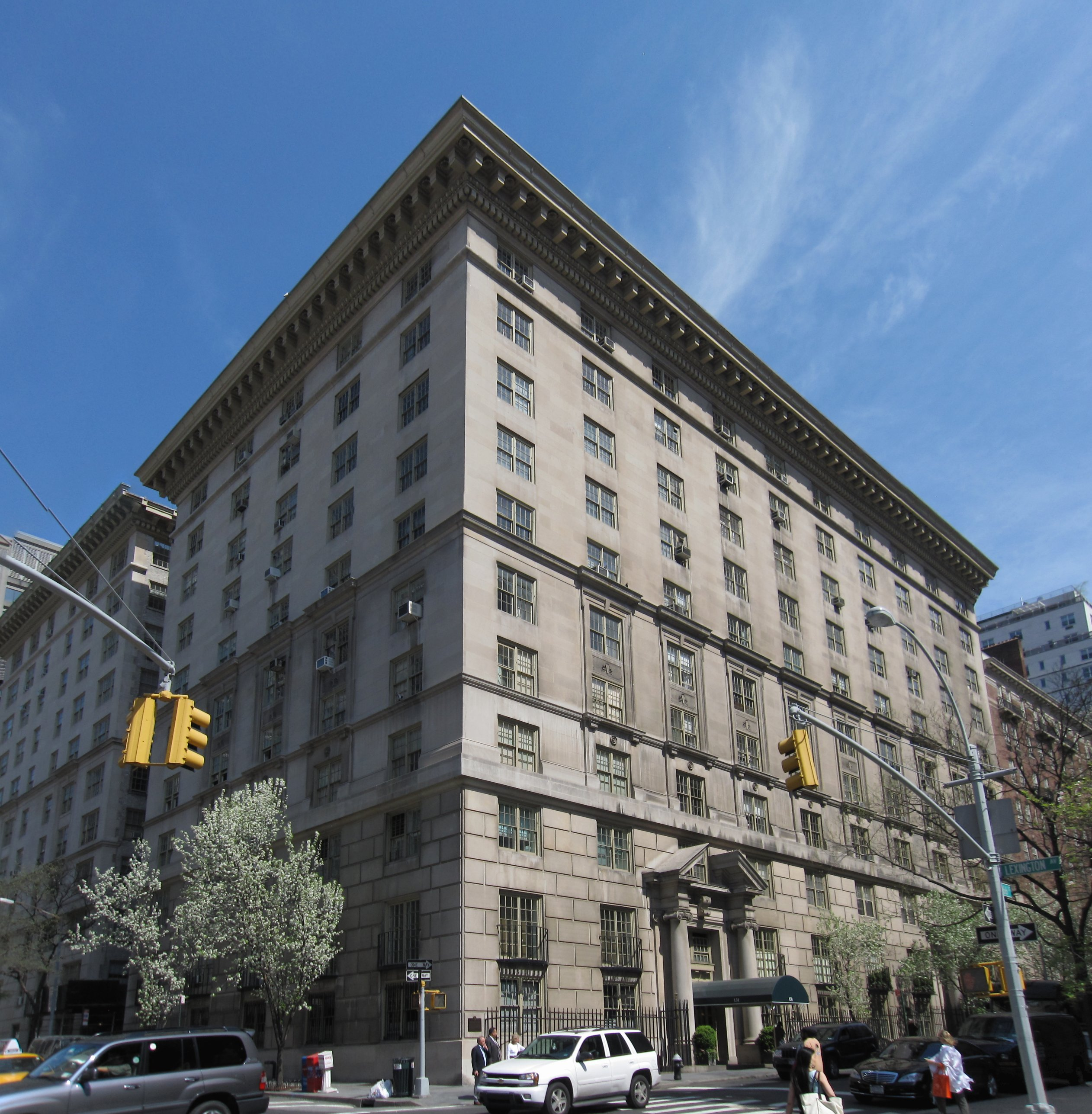
Studio Building, New York City (completed 1906).

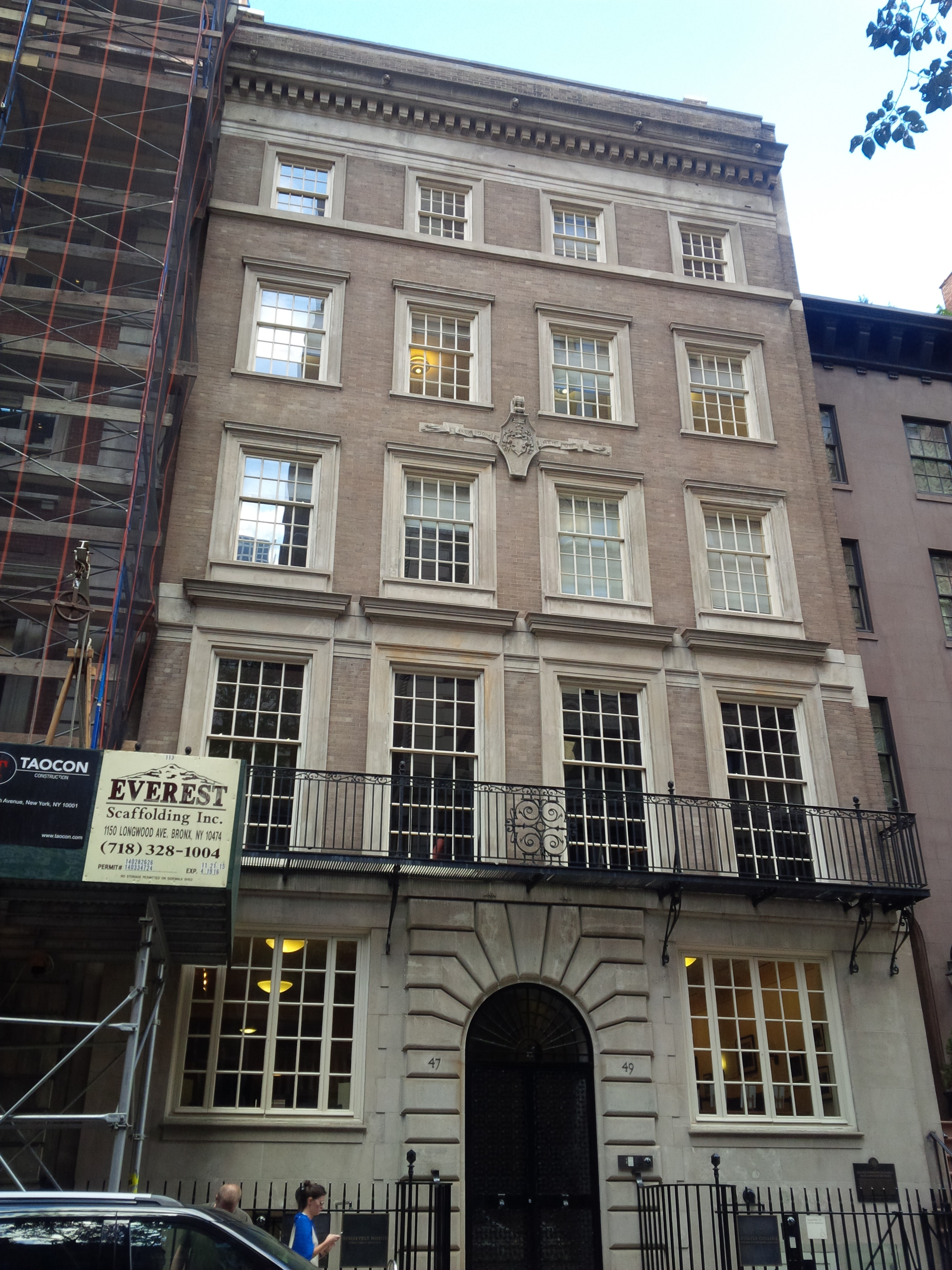
Sara Delano Roosevelt Memorial House, New York City (completed 1908).

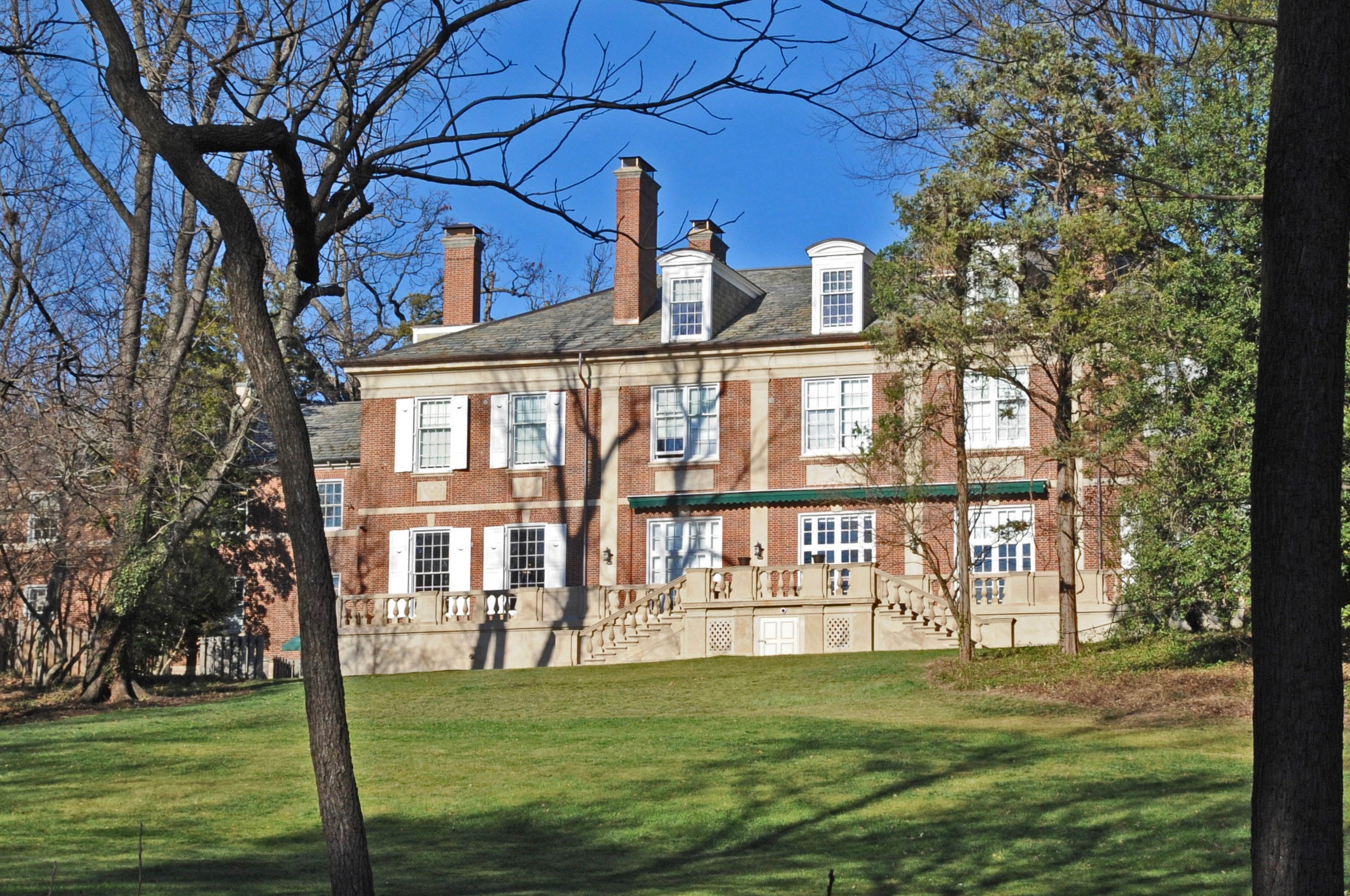
The Causeway, District of Columbia (completed 1912).

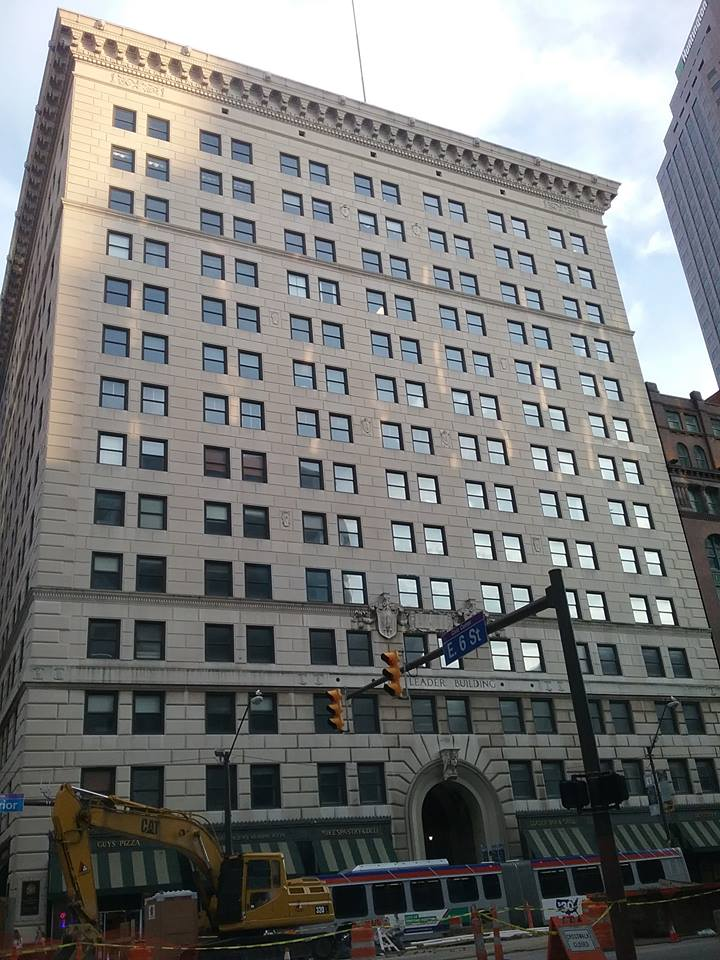
The Cleveland Leader Building, Cleveland, Ohio (completed 1913).

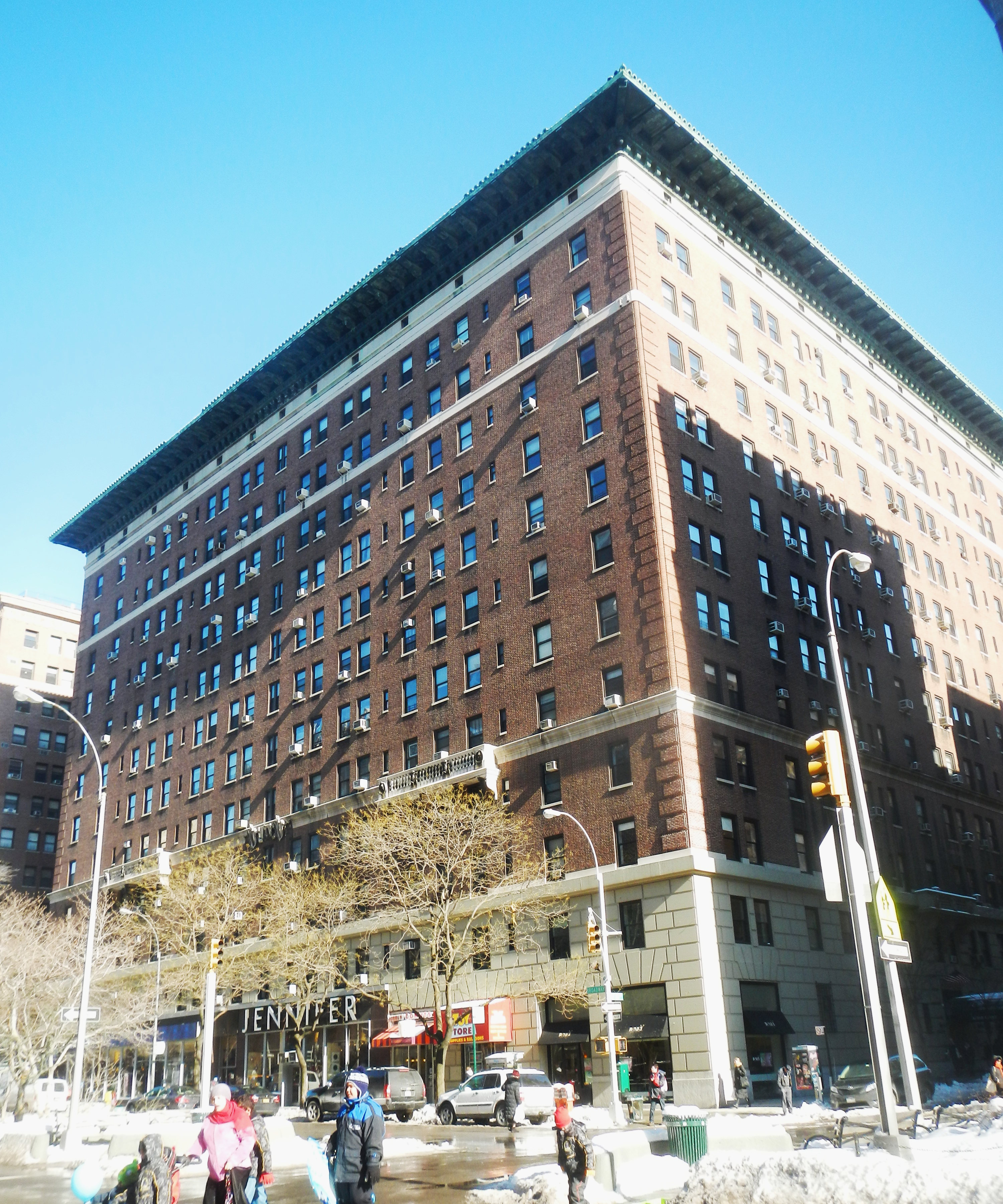
Astor Court Building, Broadway, New York City (completed in 1916).

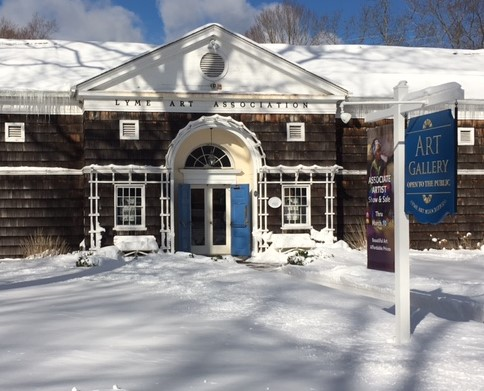
Lyme Art Association, Old Lyme, Connecticut (completed in 1921).

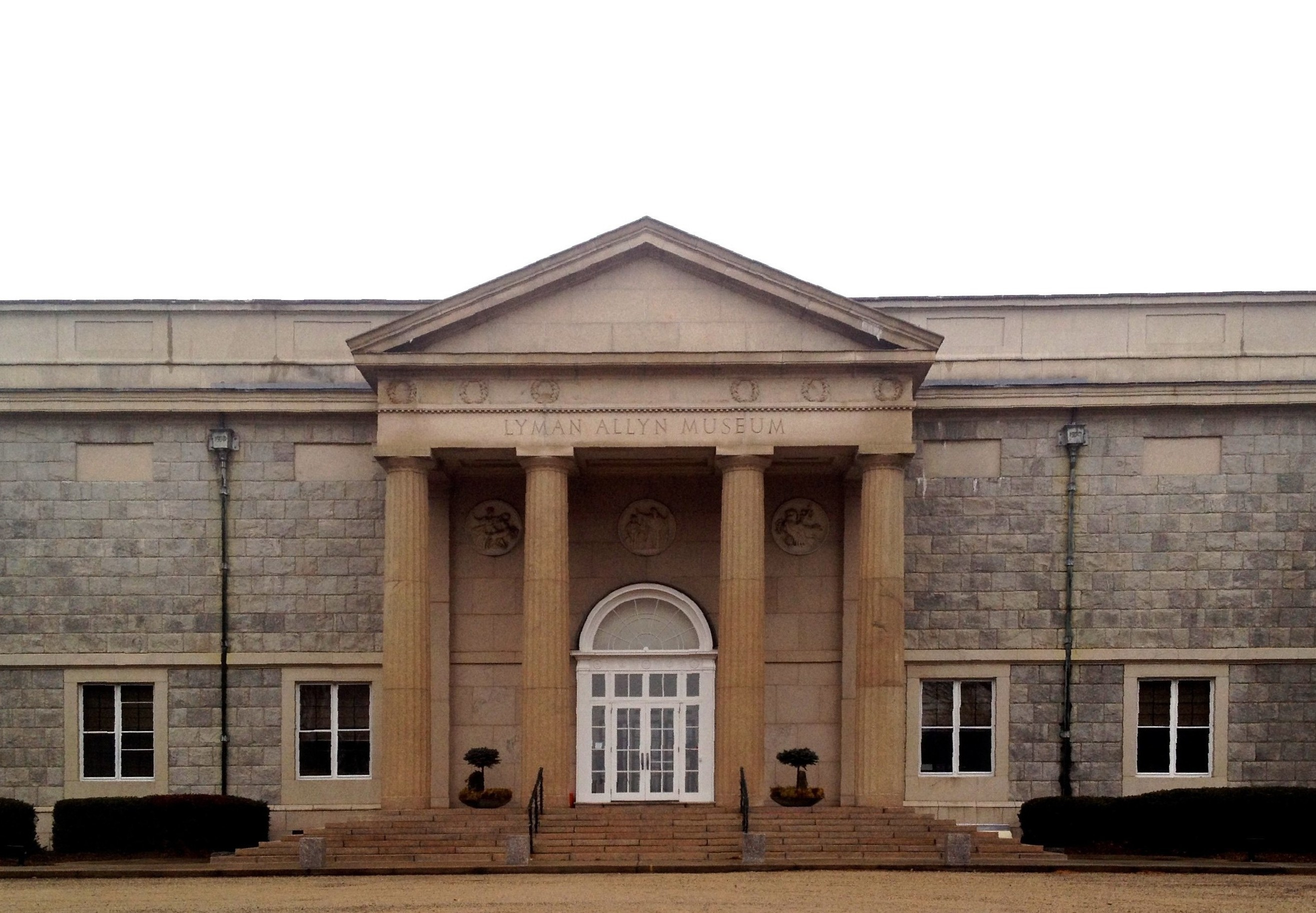
The Lyman Allyn Art Museum, New London, Connecticut (completed 1932).

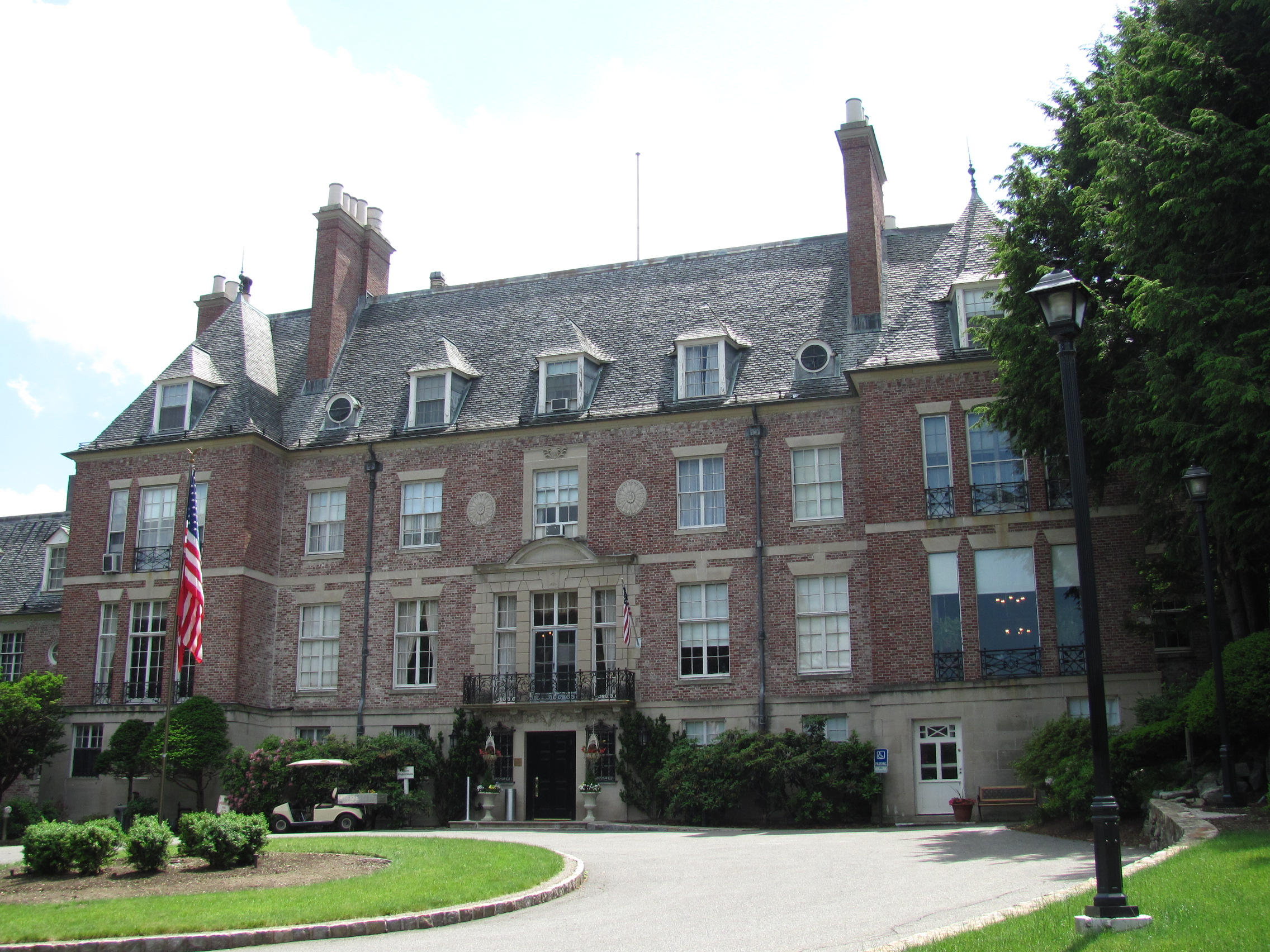
Endicott House, Dedham, Massachusetts (completed in 1934).

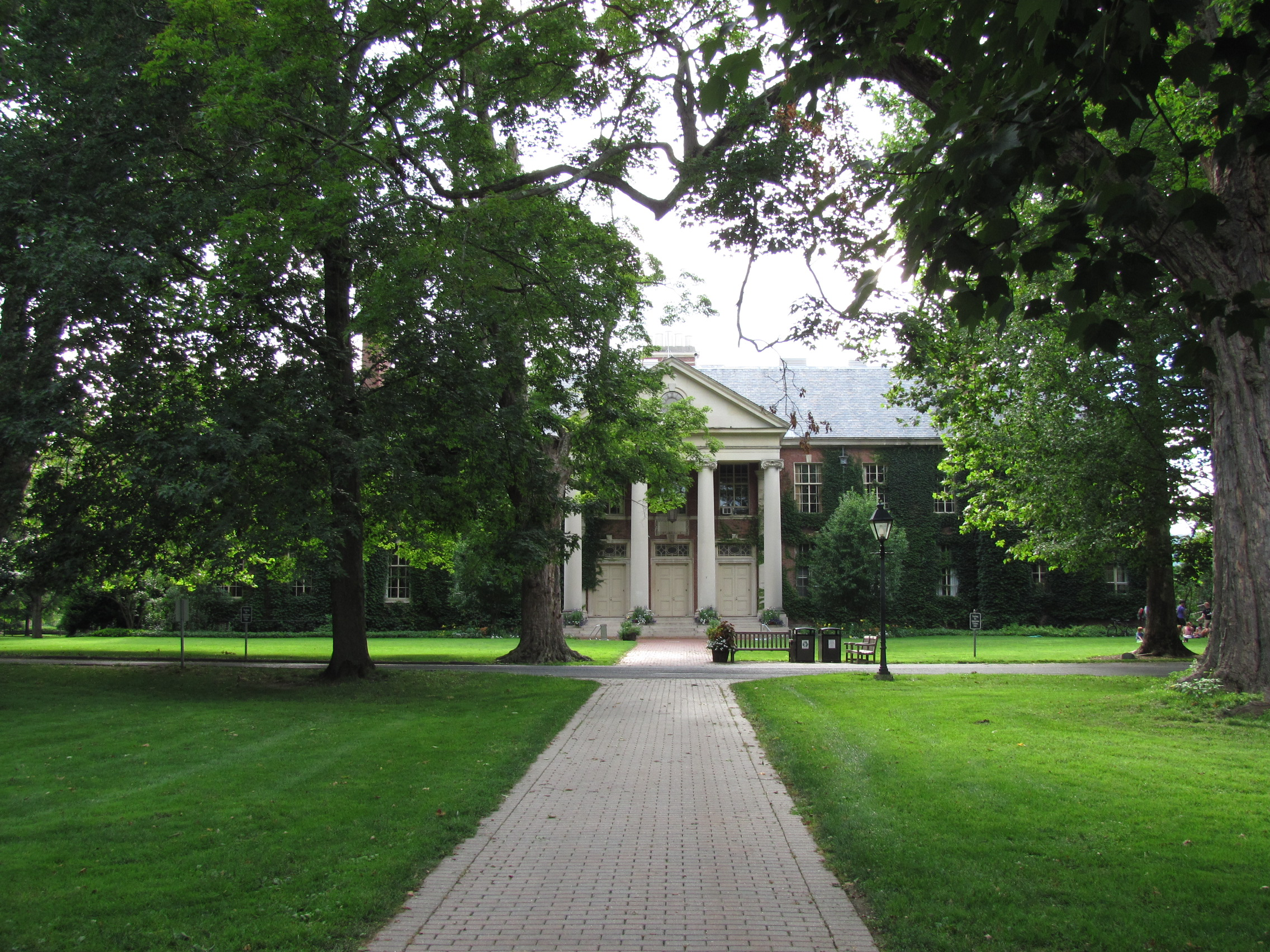
Main School Building, Deerfield Academy, Deerfield, Massachusetts (completed 1931).

== Archive ==
His drawings and archives, including the original glass plate negatives for "Italian Gardens" are held by the Department of Drawings & Archives in the Avery Architectural and Fine Arts Library at Columbia University. In 1993, Platt's book, Italian Gardens, was reissued with additional photographs by Platt, and an introductory overview by Keith N. Morgan, whose research into Platt's career helped to generate a general revival of interest in Platt and his works.

== Works ==
=== Paintings ===
- “Interior of Fish-houses,” 1882
- “Fishing Boats,” 1882
- “Provincial Fishing Village,” 1882
- “Old Houses near Bruges,” 1883
- “Deventer, Holland,” 1885
- “Quai des Orfèvres, Paris,” 1886
- “Dieppe,” 1887
- The Mountain-1920

=== Buildings ===
- Studio Building, 1905–06
- The Mallows, Head of the Harbor, New York, 1906
- Villa Turicum, Lake Forest, Illinois, 1912
- The Causeway, Washington, DC, 1912
- Leader Building, Cleveland, Ohio, 1912
- Gilbert Mansion, Little Falls, New York, 1915
- Astor Court Building 1916
- Freer Gallery of Art palazzo, Smithsonian Institution, Washington, D.C., 1918
- Hanna Theatre, Cleveland, Ohio, 1921
- Bois Dore, Newport, Rhode Island, 1927
- Addison Gallery of American Art, Andover, Massachusetts, 1931
- Crandall Public Library, Glens Falls, New York, 1931
- MIT Endicott House, Dedham, Massachusetts (designed by Platt, built in 1934)
- Home of Mrs. Henry Stephens, 241 Lake Shore Road, Grosse Pointe Farms, Michigan, 1913
