= Sara Delano Roosevelt Memorial House =

Historic house in Manhattan, New York

- U.S. National Register of Historic Places
- U.S. Historic district – Contributing property
- New York State Register of Historic Places
- New York City Landmark
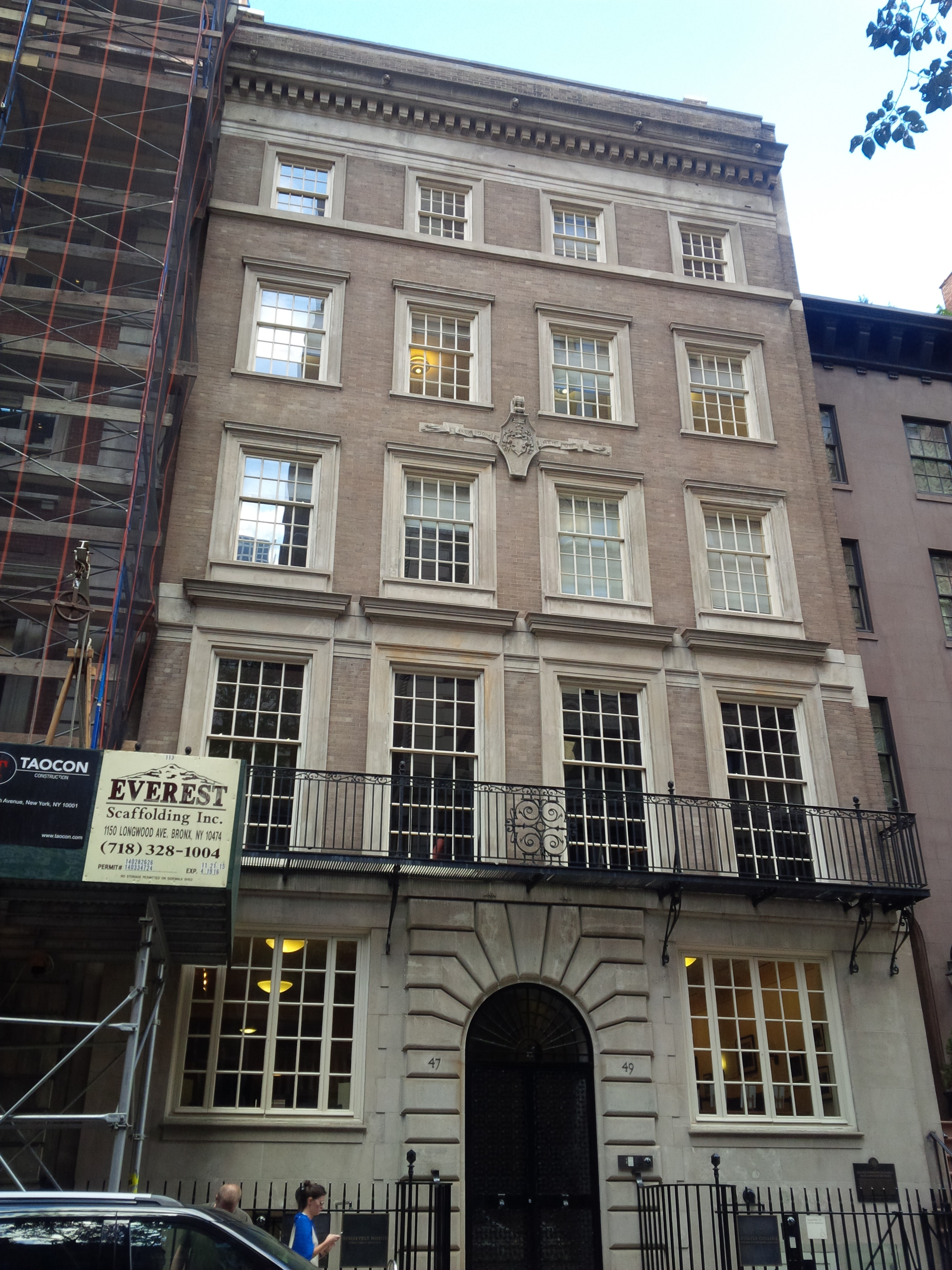
- The house

- Location within New York City Location within New York Location within the United States
- Location: 47 and 49 E. 65th St., New York, New York
- Coordinates: 40°46′1.5″N 73°58′3.5″W
- Built: 1907-1908
- Architect: Charles A. Platt
- Part of: Upper East Side Historic District (ID06000822)
- NRHP reference No.: 80002713
- NYSRHP No.: 06101.000646
- NYCL No.: 0702

Significant dates
- Added to NRHP: March 28, 1980
- Designated NYSRHP: June 23, 1980
- Designated NYCL: September 25, 1973

The Sara Delano Roosevelt Memorial House is a Neo-Georgian townhouse at 47 and 49 E. 65th St. on the Upper East Side of New York City, designed by Charles A. Platt for Sara Ann Delano Roosevelt in 1907. It originally held "two mirror-image residences with a single facade and entrance. Each first floor had its own front reception room with a welcoming fireplace. Rear parlors could be combined through sliding doors." The house was given to the Roosevelts by Franklin's mother as a wedding gift for them.

The house was used by Sara Ann Delano Roosevelt from its completion in 1908 to her death in 1941, and intermittently by Franklin and Eleanor Roosevelt from construction to their sale of the house to Hunter College in 1943. After his mother's death in 1941, President Roosevelt and his wife placed the house up for sale and a non-profit consortium was organized to purchase the house on behalf of Hunter College. The house was closed in 1992 and reopened in 2010 after an $18 million renovation. Leslie E. Robertson Associates were the structural engineers on this renovation. The building is currently used by Hunter College as the Roosevelt House Public Policy Institute at Hunter College or, simply, Roosevelt House. It was listed on the National Register of Historic Places in 1980.
