= Roosevelt House Public Policy Institute at Hunter College =

American-based think tank

Coordinates: 40.767031°N 73.967760°W

- Exterior image of the institute, 47-49 East 65th Street
- Head: Harold Holzer
- Location: New York City, New York, US
- Website: www.roosevelthouse.hunter.cuny.edu

The Roosevelt House Public Policy Institute at Hunter College (Roosevelt House) is a think tank affiliated with Hunter College. It is located at 47-49 East 65th Street in the Lenox Hill neighborhood of Manhattan's Upper East Side in New York City. It is dedicated to analyzing public policy and fostering civic engagement by educating students in public policy and human rights, supporting faculty research, and supporting scholarly and public lectures, seminars, and conferences.

== Key residents ==
The institute is housed in the historic Sara Delano Roosevelt Memorial House and honors the legacy of Franklin and Eleanor Roosevelt. Sara Delano Roosevelt, Franklin Roosevelt's mother, promised to buy a new home for him and his wife, Eleanor. In December 1908, the family moved into the building which still stands: Franklin, Eleanor, and their children, James and Anna, into No. 49; Sara Delano Roosevelt, into No. 47. Franklin was the only president elected to four consecutive presidential terms, while Eleanor led movements for human rights and was a key figure in some feminist movements, fighting for women's rights. Over 24 years, many events took place in Roosevelt House.

As Eleanor Roosevelt had more children, she and her husband spent less time together. In 1918, she found out about Franklin Roosevelt's affair with the secretary, Lucy Mercer. She "offered FDR a divorce, but FDR turned down her offer". Eleanor became involved in "a number of political organizations, including the League of Women Voters and the Women's Trade Union League". After Franklin Roosevelt was diagnosed with polio in 1921, Eleanor took care of him, although both Roosevelts were growing further apart. In 1928, Roosevelt was elected governor of New York. Eleanor, one of the leading Democrats at the time, was largely involved in Franklin Roosevelt's decision making and other activities.

== Political importance ==
After being elected as president, Franklin Roosevelt set up his administration at the Roosevelt House. It was also at Roosevelt House where he offered positions to individuals, including Frances Perkins, the "first female to serve as a Cabinet Secretary." Before his inauguration in March 1933, Franklin Roosevelt held meetings there to discuss what was to be done within the First Hundred Days. The early New Deal was also discussed during these meetings. Sara Delano Roosevelt, Franklin Roosevelt's mother, "hosted Mary McLeod Bethune, a key African-American leader, who later served as the head of FDR's informal 'Black Cabinet' during the New Deal". On November 9, 1932, the day after the presidential election, Franklin Roosevelt made his "first radio address to the American people as president-elect". Eleanor used to "walk over to visit students and speak at special events". In 1941, when Sara Delano died, Franklin put the property up for sale, but a nonprofit group offered to buy it for Hunter College. To make the property more affordable, Franklin lowered the buying price and donated money for students to buy books.

== Present day ==
Restoration work on the Roosevelt House started in 2005, and was done by 2010. The Roosevelt House was being repaired while preserving "the historically significant floor-plan of the first through fourth floors". The historical site still retains its political beauty. Although it used to be called home to our former President, it's now home to many human rights, public policy, and political science students at Hunter. Panels and social events are often held here. A small collection of Roosevelt family memorabilia is on view in Franklin D. Roosevelt's historic library, located on the second floor of the house. Two apartments are used to house visiting scholars and in the rear is a large room that can be used as an auditorium.

== Academic programs and scholarships ==
Roosevelt House offers two minor and certificate academic programs, in human rights and public policy, and sponsors the Hunter College Roosevelt House Scholarship.

Roosevelt House Faculty Associates are appointed from the Hunter College faculty for a renewable three-year term.
